= Accompanied combined transport =

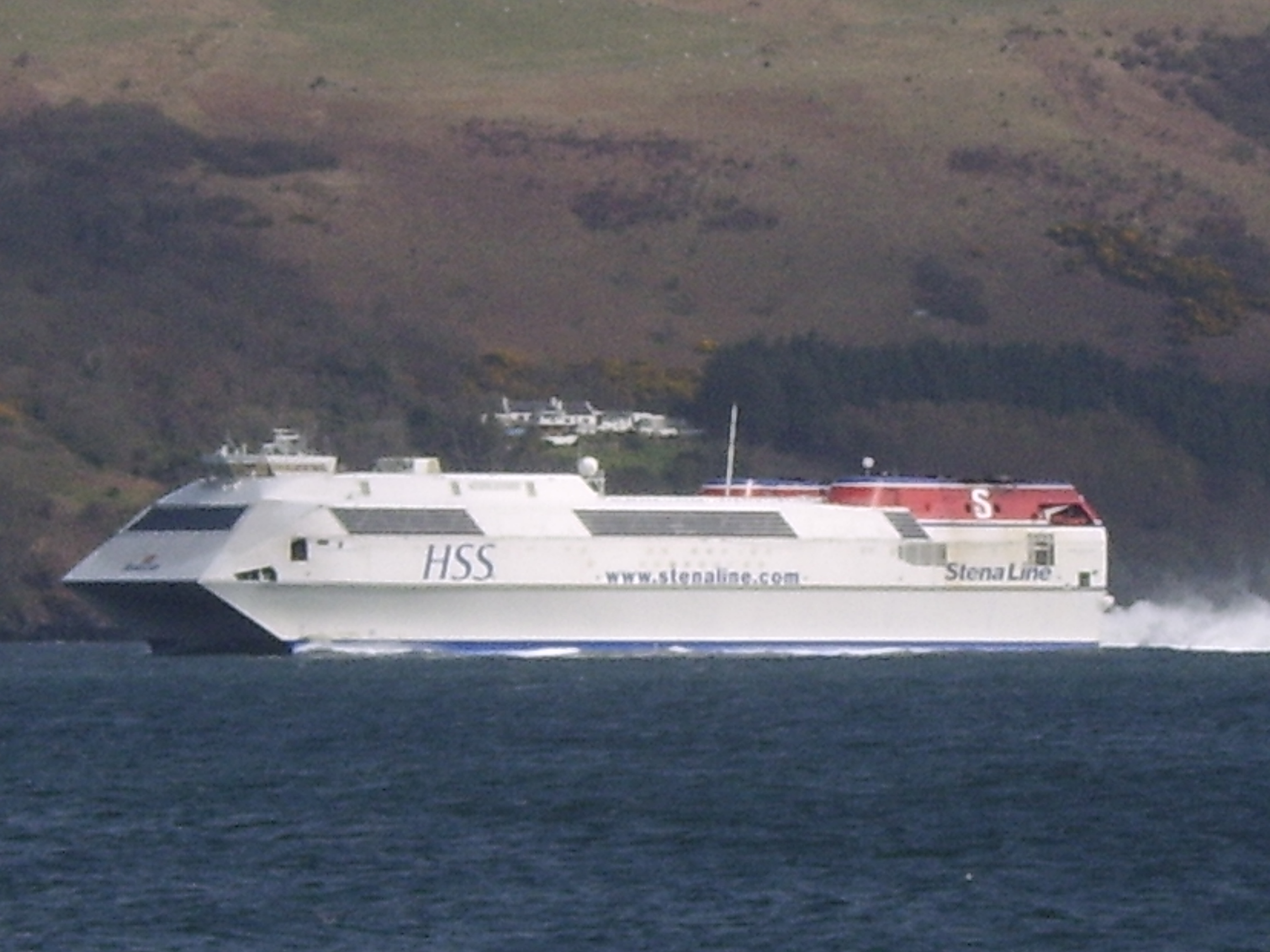
Stena Voyager (HSS) en route to Belfast from Stranraer.

Accompanied combined transport is a form of intermodal transport, which is the movement of goods in one and the same loading unit or road vehicle, using successively two or more modes of transport without handling the goods themselves in changing modes. More specifically, accompanied combined transport is one of the two types of combined transport, which is intermodal transport where the major part of the journey is by rail, inland waterways or sea, and any initial and/or final legs carried out by road are as short as possible.

Combined transport is said to be "accompanied" when the driver of a complete freight carrying road vehicle is accompanying that vehicle, while it is being transported using other mode of transport. This form of intermodal freight transport is relatively common in Europe.

== Accompanied combined transport by rail ==
=== Introduction ===
There are two basic types of rail service that may involve accompanied combined transport:

- A car shuttle train (not to be confused with a Motorail service) is a train used to transport road vehicles a relatively short distance while accompanied by their occupants. Car shuttle trains commonly operate through a rail tunnel connecting two places not easily accessible to each other by road. This type of rail service usually transports accompanied freight carrying road vehicles as well as passenger carrying vehicles. However, transport of freight carrying road vehicles on car shuttle trains is not always strictly combined transport, because the car shuttle train trip may be only a small fraction of the freight carrying road vehicle's overall journey.
- A rolling highway (originating from the German designation Rollende Autobahn, also known as Rollende Landstrasse ("rolling main road"), abbreviated RoLa), is a combined transport system used to transport trucks or lorries by rail, accompanied by their drivers travelling in a railway passenger car or couchette with seats or beds.

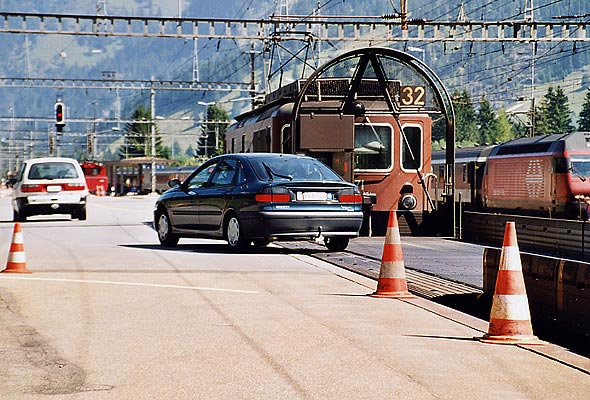
Unloading a car shuttle train in Kandersteg, Switzerland.

=== Car shuttle trains ===
==== Austria ====
- Böckstein (Salzburg) – Mallnitz-Obervellach (Carinthia): Autoschleuse Tauernbahn (ÖBB)

==== France – United Kingdom ====
Accompanied road vehicles are carried in closed railway wagons through the Channel Tunnel between Sangatte (Pas-de-Calais, France) and Cheriton (Kent, United Kingdom).

==== Germany ====
The DB AutoZug SyltShuttle transports road vehicles on railway wagons over the Hindenburgdamm from Niebüll to Westerland in Sylt (or in the opposite direction).

==== Switzerland ====
The following car shuttle trains (Swiss German: Autoverlad) operate in Switzerland (mostly through tunnels):

- Andermatt (UR) - Sedrun (GR): Oberalp (MGB)
- Brig (VS) - Iselle (Italy): Simplon (SBB)
- Kandersteg (BE) - Goppenstein (VS): Lötschberg (no road connection) (BLS)
- Kandersteg (BE) - Iselle (Italy): Lötschberg und Simplon (BLS)
- Oberwald (VS) - Realp (UR): Furka (MGB)
- Klosters Selfranga (GR) - Sagliains (GR): Vereina Tunnel (instead of the drive over the Flüelapass) (RhB)
- Thusis (GR) - Samedan (GR): Albula (as an alternative to the Julierpass) (RhB)

Up until the opening of the Gotthard Road Tunnel in 1980, there was also a car shuttle train through the Gotthard Rail Tunnel between Göschenen und Airolo. Following the catastrophic fire in the road tunnel on 24 October 2001, this car shuttle train resumed operations for a few weeks.

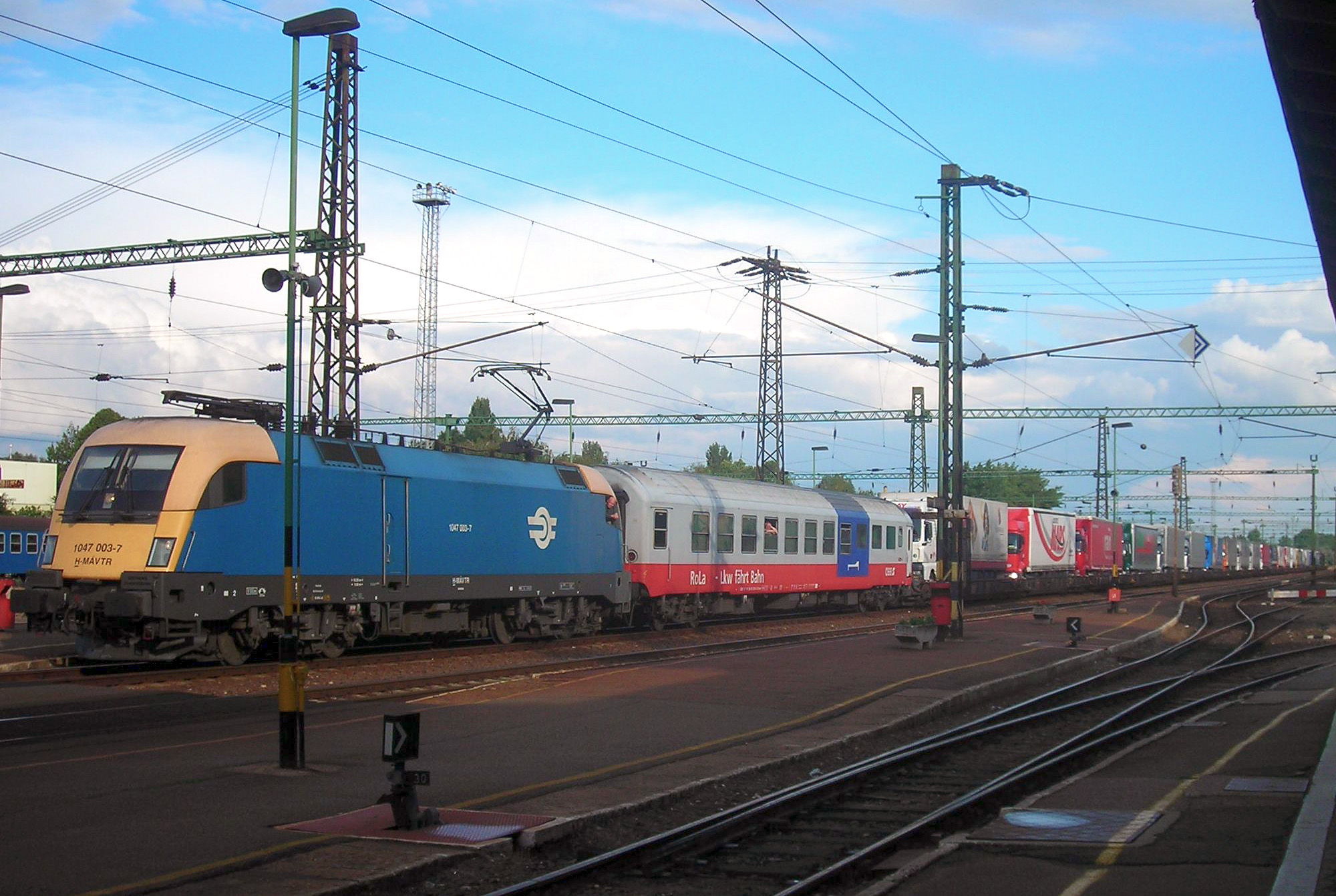
MÁV 1047 with a rolling highway train in Kecskemét, Hungary.

=== Rolling highways ===
Rolling highways are mostly used for transit routes, e.g. through the Alps or between western and eastern Europe.

==== Austria ====
In Austria, rolling highways operate from Bayern via Tyrol to Italy or to Eastern Europe.

==== India ====
A rolling highway operates between Kolad in Maharashtra and Verna in Goa, with an extension to Surathkal in Karnataka. This service is more commonly known as RORO (roll-on-roll-off) in Konkan Railway.

==== Switzerland ====
In Switzerland, there are rolling highways across the Alps on both the Gotthard and the Lötschberg - Simplon routes.

== Accompanied combined transport by water ==
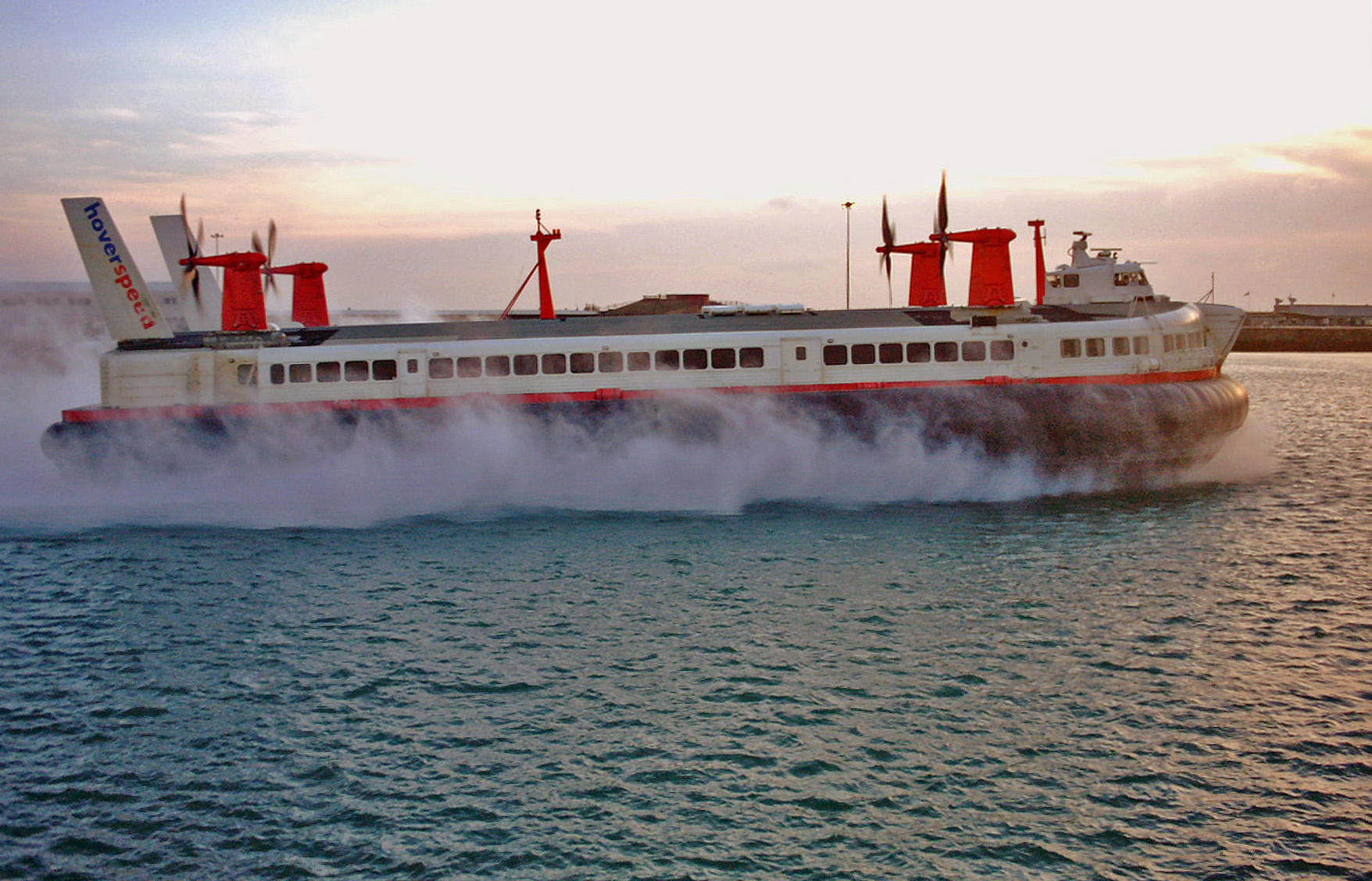
Mark 3 SR.N4 hovercraft, Dover.

=== Hovercraft ===
Between 1968 and 2000, several hovercraft services transported accompanied road vehicles, including freight carrying vehicles, between Calais in France and either Dover or Ramsgate in the United Kingdom.

== See also ==
- Auto Train
- Car ferry
- Car shuttle train
- Combined transport
- Intermodal freight transport
- Modalohr
- Rolling highway
