= Klosters railway station (disambiguation) =

Klosters railway station may refer to one of several railway stations in Davos, Switzerland:

- Klosters Platz railway station, formerly Klosters railway station
- Klosters Selfranga railway station
- Klosters Dorf railway station
- Baldegg Kloster railway station
