= Combined transport =

Form of intermodal transport

Combined transport is a form of intermodal transport, which is the movement of goods in one and the same loading unit or road vehicle, using successively two or more modes of transport without handling the goods themselves in changing modes. Combined transport is intermodal transport where the major part of the journey is by rail, inland waterways or sea, and any initial and/or final legs carried out by road are as short as possible.

== See also ==
- Accompanied combined transport
- Car shuttle train
- Intermodal freight transport
- Multimodal transport
- Ro-ro ferry
- Rolling highway
- Piggyback (transportation)
