= Klosters Platz railway station =

Railway station in Klosters, Switzerland

Klosters Platz
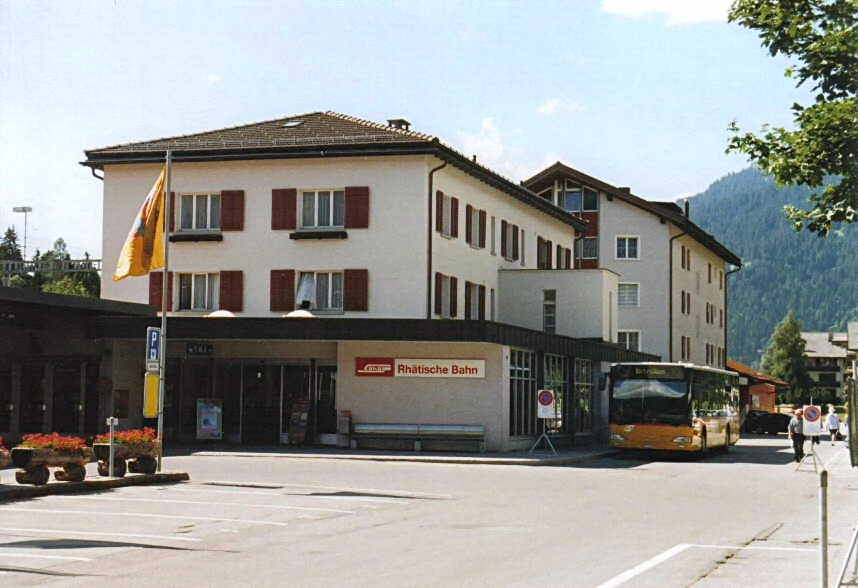
- The station building in 2003

General information
- Location: Bahnhofstrasse 2 Klosters-Serneus; Switzerland
- Coordinates: 46°52′09″N 9°52′51″E
- Elevation: 1,191 m (3,907 ft)
- Owner: Rhaetian Railway
- Lines: Landquart–Davos Platz line; Vereina Tunnel
- Distance: 32.4 km (20.1 mi) from Landquart
- Platforms: 3
- Train operators: Rhaetian Railway
- Connections: PostAuto Schweiz buses

Other information
- IATA code: ZHS

History
- Opened: 9 October 1889; 136 years ago
- Electrified: 1 December 1920; 105 years ago
- Former names: Klosters

Passengers
- 2018: 2,400 per weekday

Services
| Preceding station | Rhaetian Railway | Following station |
|---|---|---|
| through to RE 13 | RE 1 | Cavadürli towards Davos Platz |
| through to RE 13 | RE 3 | Zernez towards St. Moritz |
| through to RE 24 | RE 2 | Davos Dorf towards Davos Platz |
| through to RE 24 | RE 4 | Sagliains towards Scuol-Tarasp |
| Saas towards Landquart | RE 13 | through to RE 1 |
| Saas towards Landquart | RE 13 | through to RE 3 |
| Klosters Dorf towards Landquart | RE 24 | through to RE 2 |
| Klosters Dorf towards Landquart | RE 24 | through to RE 4 |
Location

Klosters Platz railway station (formerly Klosters railway station) is located in the municipality of Klosters-Serneus in the district of Prattigau/Davos in the Swiss canton of Graubünden. It is the main Rhaetian station in the village of Klosters on the Landquart–Davos Platz railway (not to be confused with the second station in Klosters on this line, the smaller Klosters Dorf railway station) and is the northern end of the Vereina Tunnel. The Vereina car shuttle service operates from the nearby station of Klosters Selfranga.

== Services ==
As of the December 2023 timetable change, the following services stop at Klosters Platz:

- RegioExpress: half-hourly service between Landquart and Davos Platz and hourly service to St. Moritz and Scuol-Tarasp.
