= Davos Dorf railway station =

Railway station in Switzerland

Davos Dorf
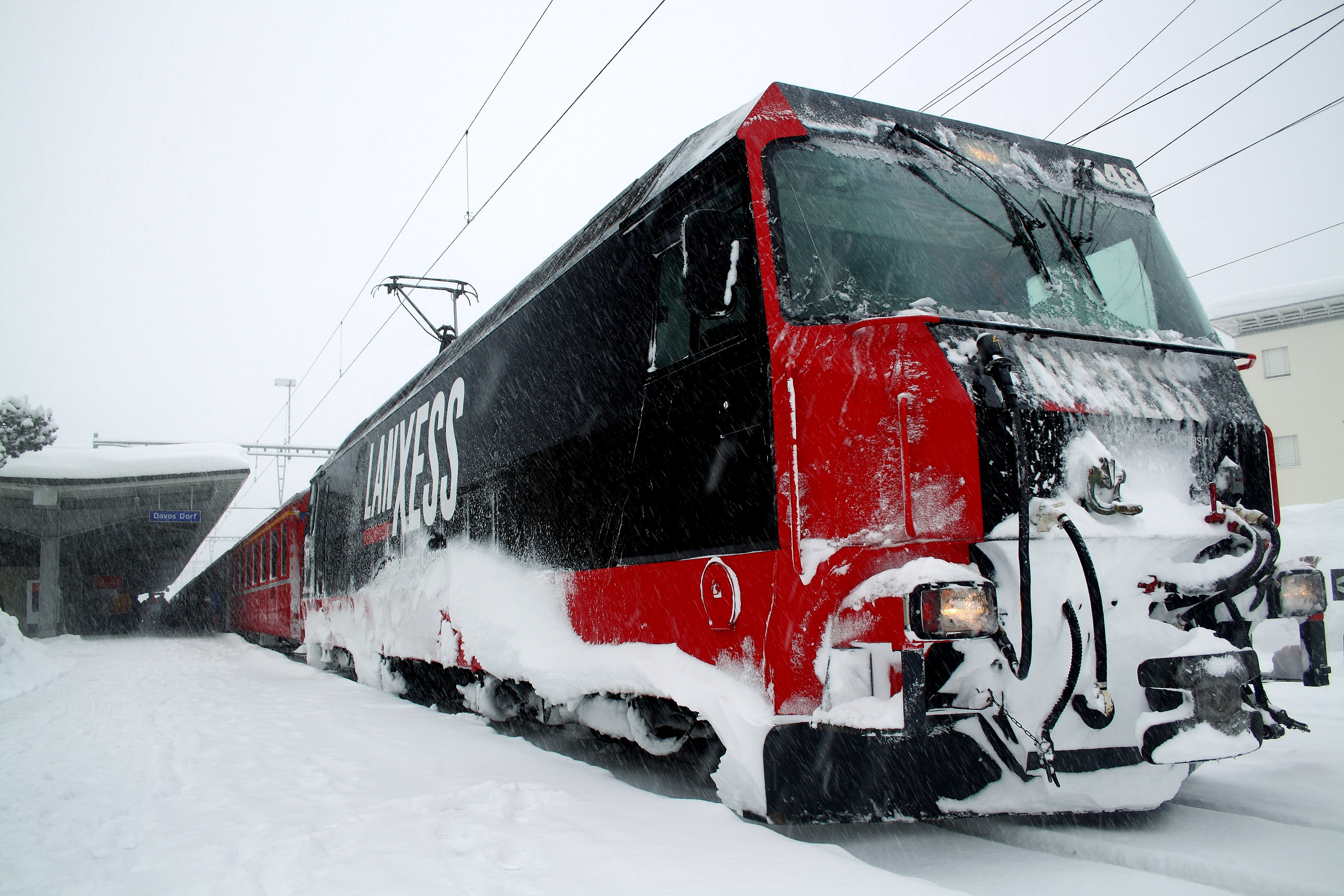
- A Ge 4/4 III at the station in 2009 after a heavy snowfall

General information
- Location: Flüelastrasse; Davos; Switzerland
- Coordinates: 46°48′35″N 9°50′32″E
- Elevation: 1,559 m (5,115 ft)
- Owner: Rhaetian Railway
- Line: Landquart–Davos Platz line
- Distance: 47.3 km (29.4 mi) from Landquart
- Train operators: Rhaetian Railway
- Connections: PostAuto Schweiz and Verkehrsbetrieb der Landschaft Davos buses

History
- Opened: 21 July 1890; 136 years ago
- Electrified: 1 December 1920; 105 years ago

Passengers
- 2018: 1,100 per weekday

Services
Preceding station	Rhaetian Railway	Following station
Davos Wolfgang towards Landquart	RE 1	Davos Platz Terminus
Klosters Platz towards Landquart	RE 2	Davos Platz Terminus
Location

Davos Dorf railway station (German: Bahnhof Davos Dorf) is a railway station in the municipality of Davos, in the Swiss canton of Grisons. It is an intermediate stop on the 1,000 mm (3 ft 3 3/8 in) metre gauge Landquart–Davos Platz line of the Rhaetian Railway.

Northbound, there is a half-hourly service towards Landquart. Southbound, there is a half-hourly service to Davos Platz. The station also serves as a hub for local bus services. Davos Platz station is located about 2.5 km southwest of Davos Dorf.

The station currently has one platform in use, served by trains in both directions.

== Services ==
As of the December 2023 timetable change, the following services stop at Davos Dorf:

- RegioExpress: half-hourly service between Landquart and Davos Platz.
