= Saas railway station =

Railway station in Grisons, Switzerland

Saas im Prättigau
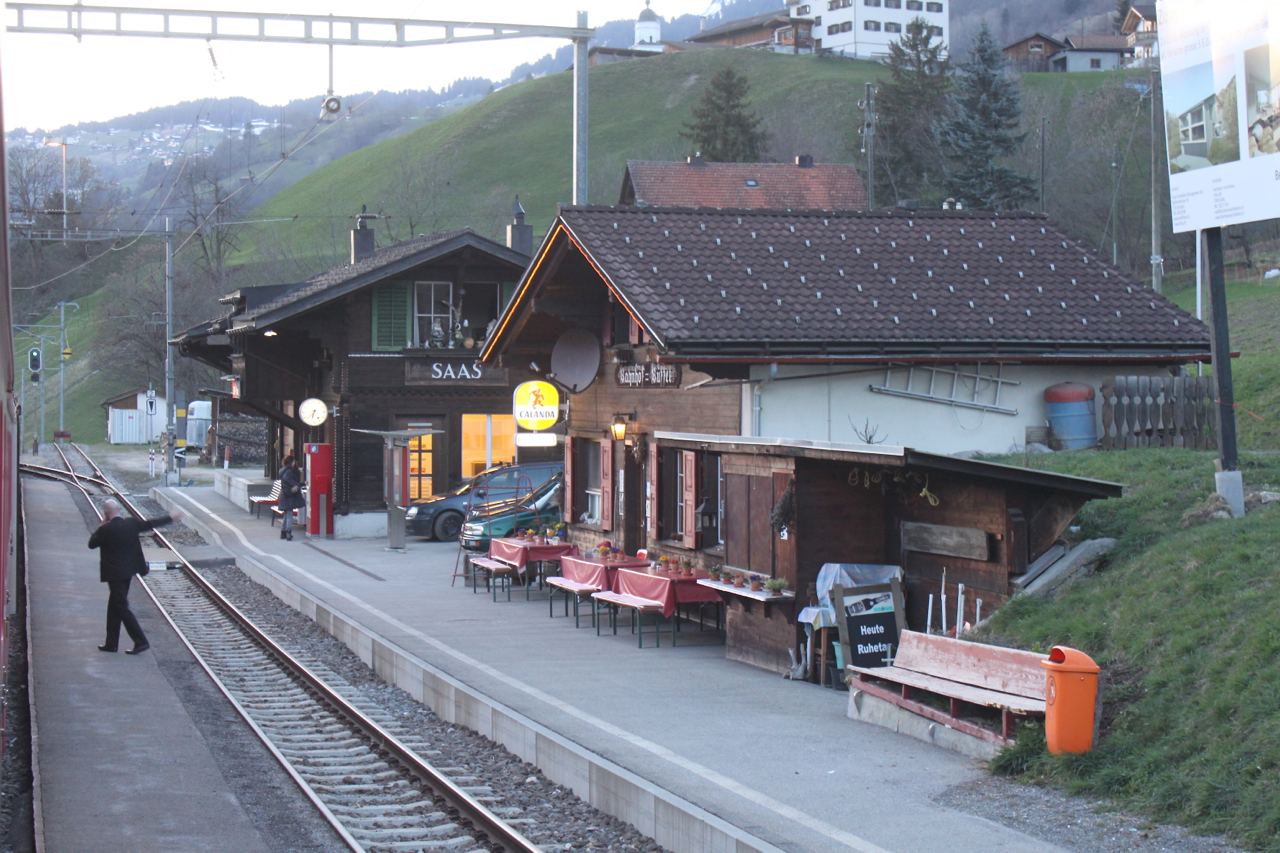
- The station building and restaurant in

General information
- Location: Bahnhofstrasse 167B; Saas im Prättigau; Switzerland
- Coordinates: 46°54′28″N 9°48′36″E
- Elevation: 935 m (3,068 ft)
- Owner: Rhaetian Railway
- Line: Landquart–Davos Platz line
- Distance: 24.6 km (15.3 mi) from Landquart
- Platforms: 1
- Train operators: Rhaetian Railway

History
- Opened: 9 October 1889; 136 years ago
- Electrified: 7 November 1921; 104 years ago
- Former names: Saas

Passengers
- 2018: 90 per weekday

Services
Preceding station	Rhaetian Railway	Following station
Küblis towards Landquart	RE 13	Klosters Platz towards Davos Platz or St. Moritz
Location

Saas railway station (German: Bahnhof Saas), also known as Saas im Prättigau railway station, is a railway station in the municipality of Saas im Prättigau, in the Swiss canton of Grisons. It is an intermediate stop on the 1,000 mm (3 ft 3 3/8 in) gauge Landquart–Davos Platz line of the Rhaetian Railway.

== Services ==
As of the December 2023 timetable change, the following services stop at Saas:

- RegioExpress: hourly service between Landquart and Davos Platz or St. Moritz.
