= Fideris railway station =

Railway station in Switzerland

Fideris
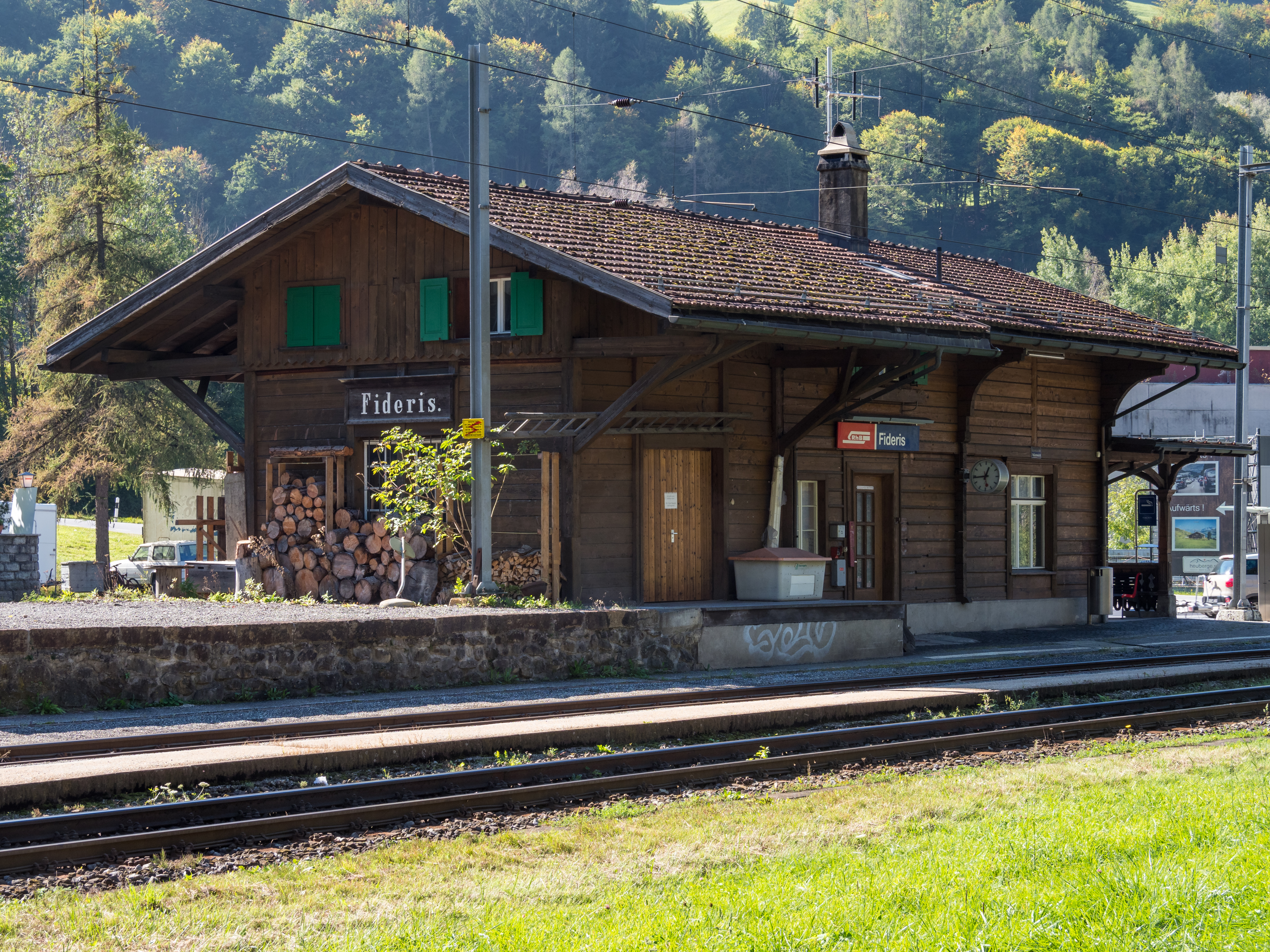
- Fideris station in 2021

General information
- Location: Fideris; Switzerland
- Coordinates: 46°55′21″N 9°44′02″E
- Elevation: 744 m (2,441 ft)
- Owner: Rhaetian Railway
- Line: Landquart–Davos Platz line
- Distance: 18.2 km (11.3 mi) from Landquart
- Train operators: Rhaetian Railway

Passengers
- 2018: 50 per weekday

Services
Preceding station	Rhaetian Railway	Following station
Jenaz towards Landquart	RE 24 Limited service	Küblis towards Davos Platz or Scuol-Tarasp
Location

Fideris railway station (German: Bahnhof Fideris) is a railway station in the municipality of Fideris, in the Swiss canton of Grisons. It is an intermediate stop on the Rhaetian Railway 1,000 mm (3 ft 3 3/8 in) metre gauge Landquart–Davos Platz line.

== Services ==
As of the December 2023 timetable change, the following services stop at Fideris:

- RegioExpress: rush-hour service to Landquart, Davos Platz, and Scuol-Tarasp.
