= Küblis railway station =

Railway station in Switzerland

Küblis
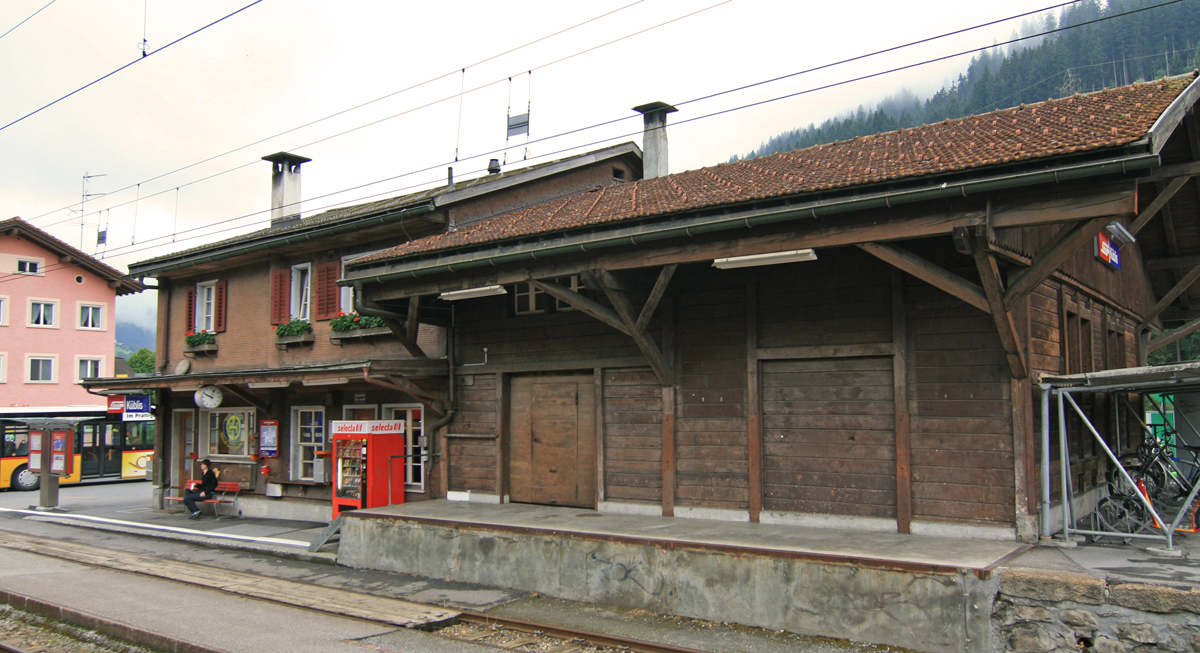
- Küblis station platform

General information
- Location: Bahnhofstrasse 6 Küblis; Switzerland
- Coordinates: 46°54′51″N 9°46′19″E
- Elevation: 810 m (2,660 ft)
- Owner: Rhaetian Railway
- Line: Landquart–Davos Platz line
- Distance: 21.4 km (13.3 mi) from Landquart
- Platforms: 2
- Train operators: Rhaetian Railway
- Connections: PostAuto Schweiz buses

History
- Opened: 9 October 1889; 136 years ago
- Electrified: 7 November 1921; 104 years ago

Passengers
- 2018: 720 per weekday

Services
Preceding station	Rhaetian Railway	Following station
Schiers towards Landquart	RE 13	Saas towards Davos Platz or St. Moritz
Fideris towards Landquart	RE 24	Klosters Dorf towards Davos Platz or Scuol-Tarasp
Location

Küblis railway station (German: Bahnhof Küblis) is a railway station in the municipality of Küblis, in the Swiss canton of Grisons. It is an intermediate stop on the Rhaetian Railway 1,000 mm (3 ft 3 3/8 in) metre gauge Landquart–Davos Platz line.

== Services ==
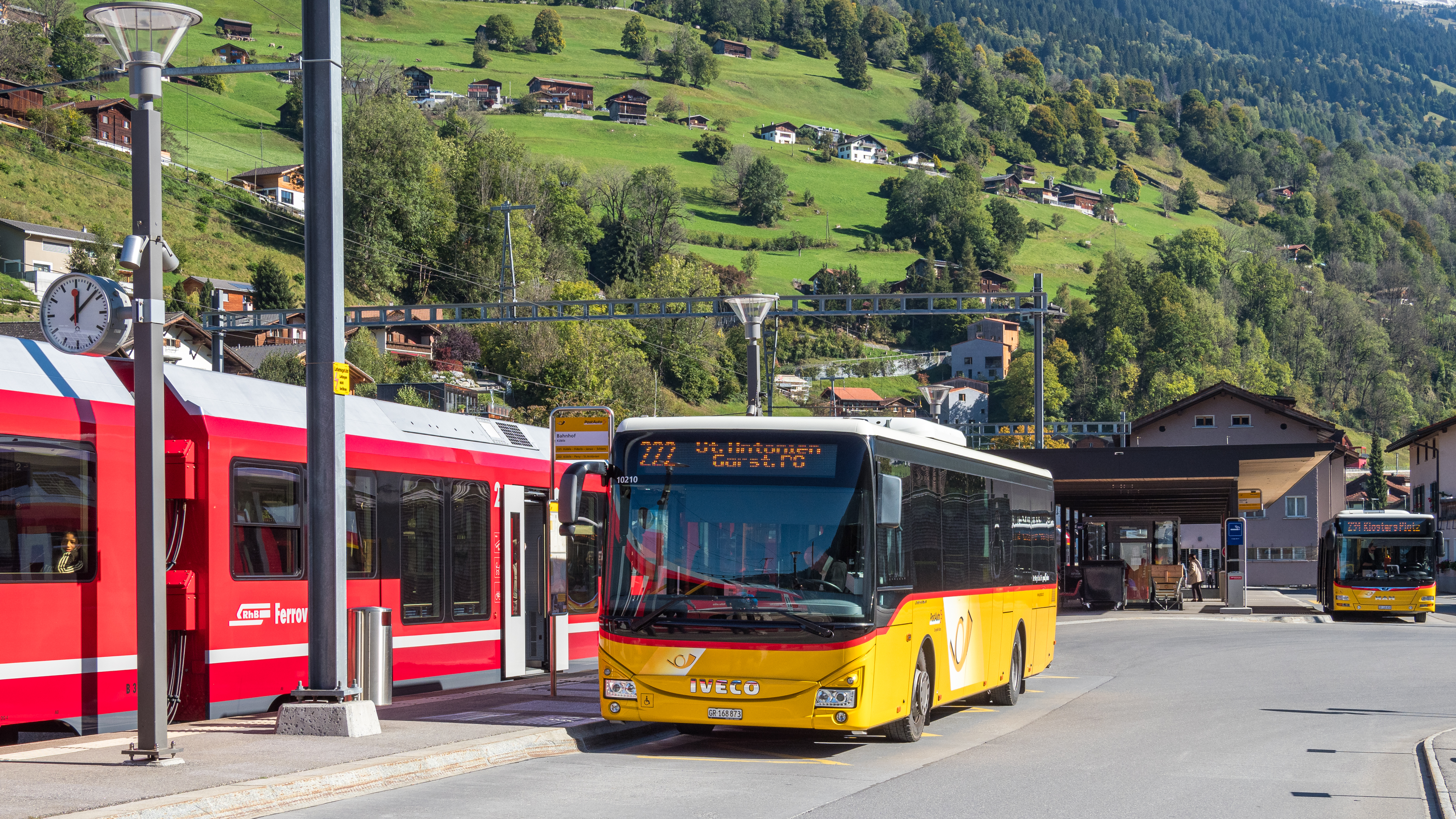
Bus meets train at Küblis station. Well organized public transport even in rural areas of Switzerland.

As of the December 2023 timetable change, the following services stop at Küblis:

- RegioExpress: half-hourly service between Landquart and Davos Platz and hourly service to St. Moritz and Scuol-Tarasp.
