= Susch railway station =

Railway station in Switzerland

Susch
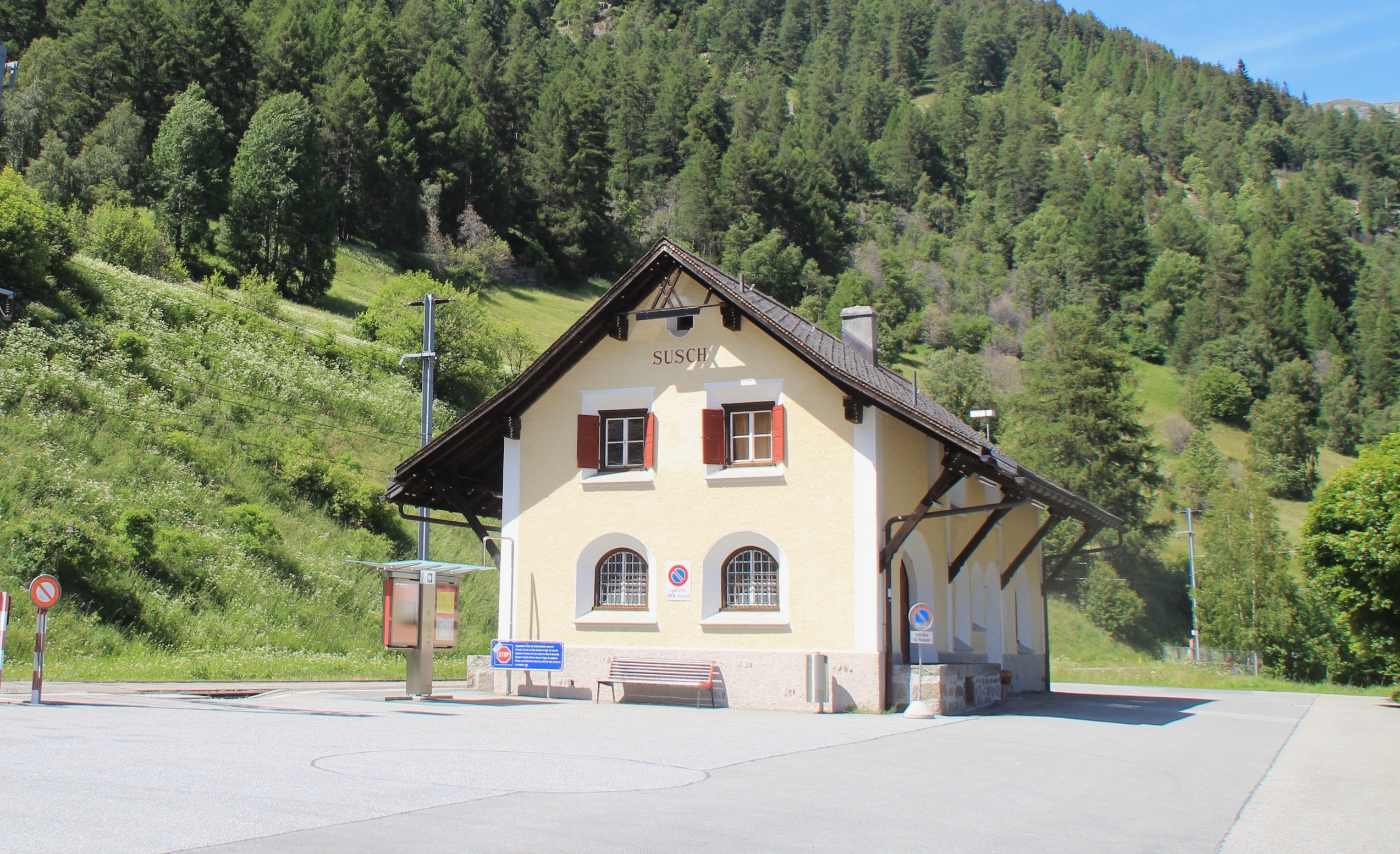
- The station building in 2018

General information
- Location: Zernez; Switzerland
- Coordinates: 46°45′07″N 10°04′46″E
- Elevation: 1,434 m (4,705 ft)
- Owner: Rhaetian Railway
- Lines: Bever–Scuol-Tarasp line; Vereina line
- Distance: 126.8 km (78.8 mi) from Landquart
- Train operators: Rhaetian Railway
- Connections: PostAuto Schweiz buses

History
- Opened: 28 June 1913

Passengers
- 2018: 160 per weekday

Services
Preceding station	Rhaetian Railway	Following station
Zernez towards Pontresina	R 15	Sagliains towards Scuol-Tarasp
Location

Susch railway station is a railway station in the municipality of Zernez, in the Swiss canton of Graubünden. It is located at the junction of the 1,000 mm (3 ft 3 3/8 in) metre gauge Bever–Scuol-Tarasp and Vereina lines of the Rhaetian Railway. Hourly services operate on this line.

== Services ==
As of the December 2023 timetable change, the following services stop at Susch:

- Regio: hourly service between Scuol-Tarasp and Pontresina.
