= RegioExpress =

Fast regional train service in Switzerland

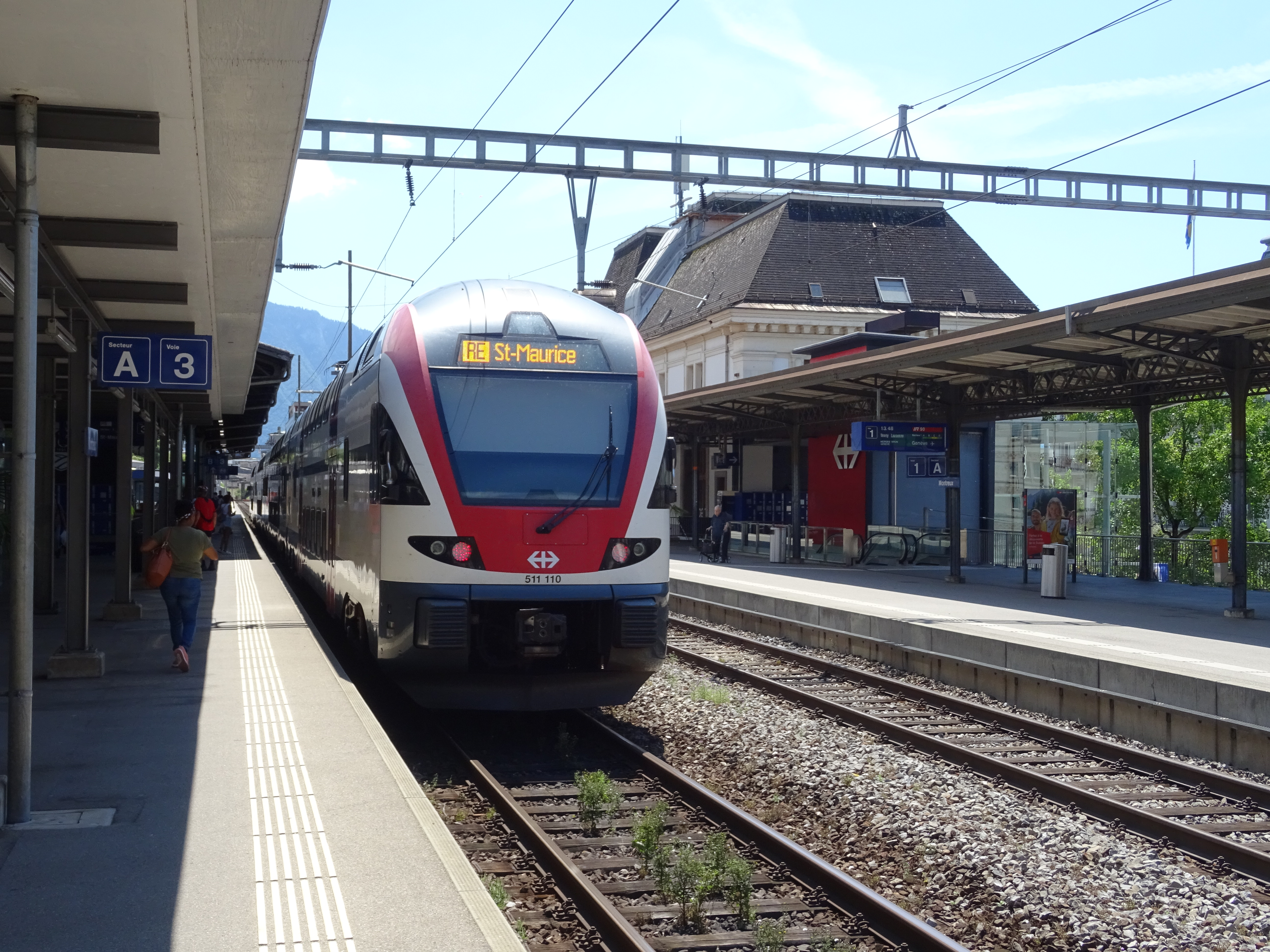
RegioExpress (RE) train of SBB in Montreux in 2020

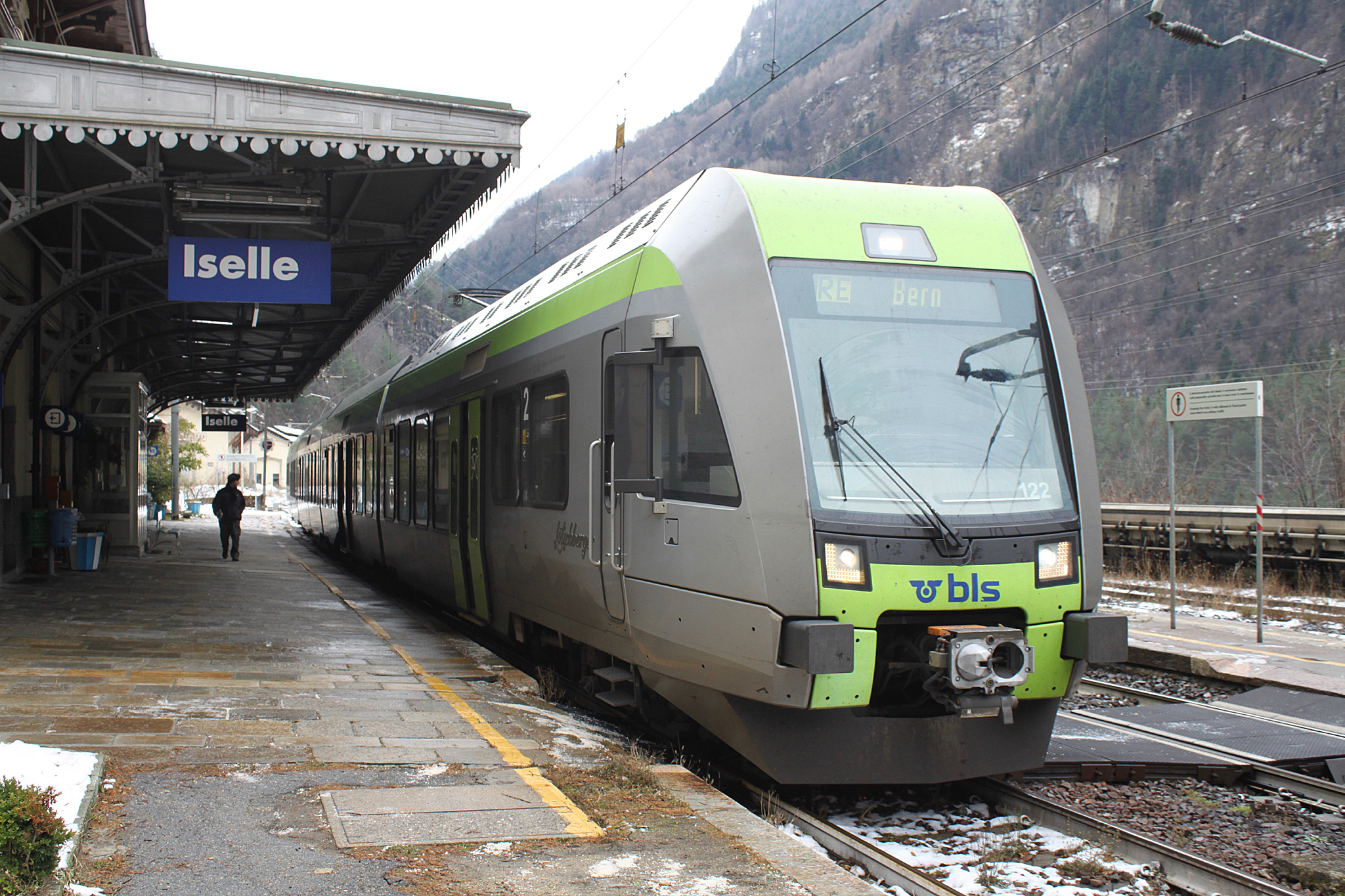
RegioExpress (RE) train of BLS in Iselle di Trasquera, Italy, in 2017

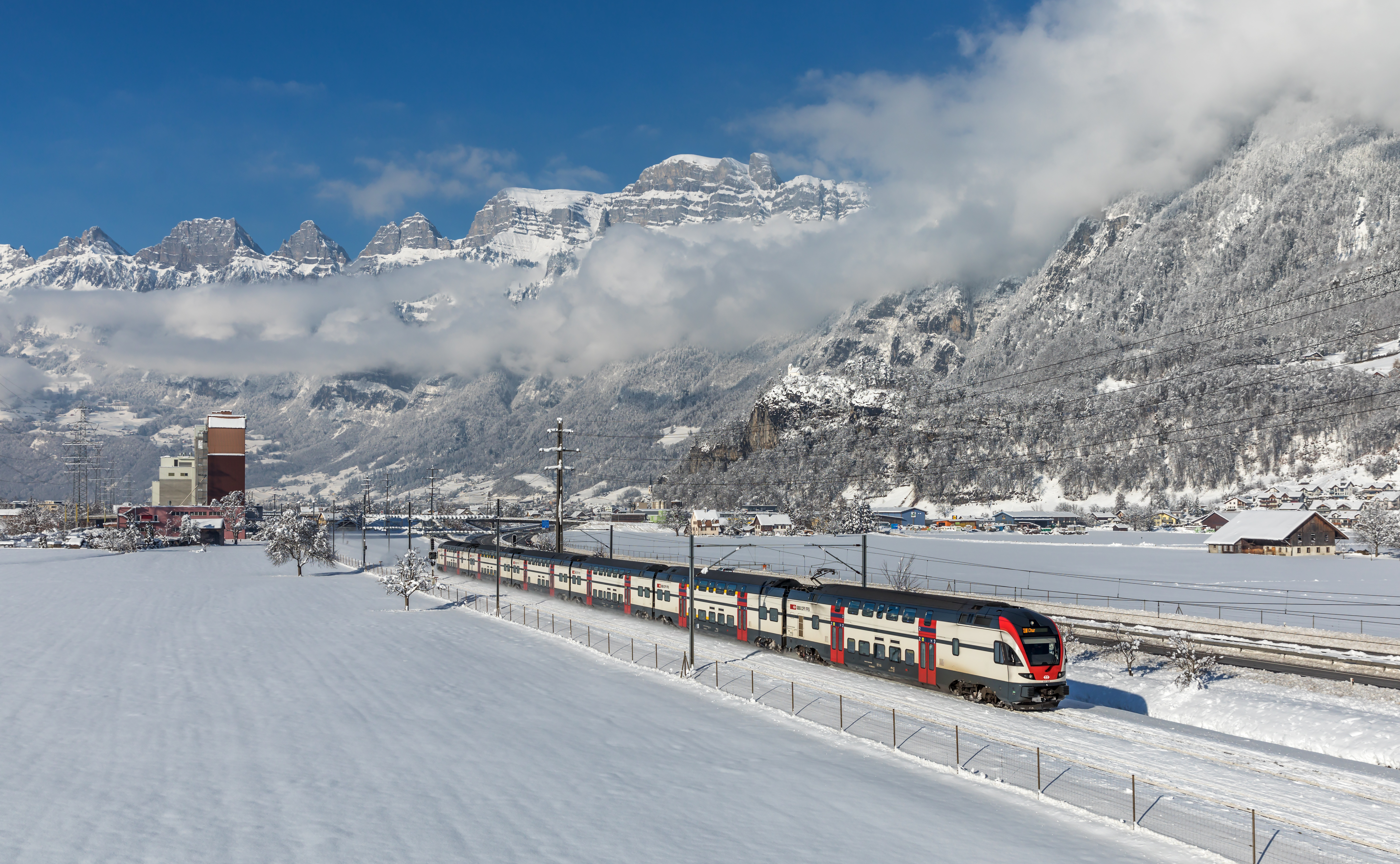
Former RegioExpress service in the Seeztal between Flums and Mels in the canton of St. Gallen

RegioExpress, commonly abbreviated to RE, is a category of fast regional train service in Switzerland, run by Swiss Federal Railways (SBB CFF FFS) or other railway companies (such as TILO, BLS, tpf, THURBO or RhB, previously also by transN). A few lines also serve stations in Germany, France and Italy. Since 2023, all RE services are numbered for more clarity. Some of them are named.

It is comparable to the Regional-Express in Germany, Austria and Luxembourg. Its speed is considerably faster than regional trains at the same level, as it does not stop at all stations served by the regional trains. Nonetheless, it is slightly slower than InterRegio trains. Swiss Federal Railways describes the trains as ones that serve "rapidly into the regions".

== List of services ==
As of the December 2025 timetable change, the following RegioExpress services exist:

Number	Route	Operator
RE1	Bern–Spiez–Kandersteg–Brig(–Domodossola)	BLS
RE 1	Klosters Platz–Cavadürli–Davos Laret–Davos Wolfgang–Davos Dorf–Davos Platz	RhB
RE1	Herisau–St. Gallen–Romanshorn–Kreuzlingen Hafen–Konstanz	THURBO
RE2	Domodossola–Brig–Visp	BLS
RE 2	Klosters Platz–Davos Platz	RhB
RE2	Bern–Düdingen–Fribourg/Freiburg–Romont FR–Bulle–La Tour-de-Trême–Broc-Village–Broc-Chocolaterie	TPF
RE 3	Klosters Platz–Zernez–S-chanf–Zuoz–Bever–Samedan–Celerina–St. Moritz	RhB
RE3	Düdingen–Fribourg/Freiburg–Romont FR–Bulle–La Tour-de-Trême–Broc-Village–Broc-Chocolaterie	TPF
RE 4	Klosters Platz–Sagliains–Zuoz–Lavin–Guarda–Ardez–Scuol-Tarasp	RhB
RE4	La Chaux-de-Fonds–St-Imier–Courtelary–Sonceboz-Sombeval–Biel/Bienne	Swiss Federal Railways
RE5	Bern–Solothurn	RBS
RE 6	Chur–Chur Altstadt–Langwies GR–Litzirüti–Arosa	RhB
RE6	Olten–Aarau–Lenzburg–Dottikon HB–Rotkreuz–Arth-Goldau	Swiss Federal Railways
RE6	Le Locle–Le Crêt-du-Locle–La Chaux-de-Fonds Les Forges–La Chaux-de-Fonds–Les Hauts-Geneveys–Les Geneveys-sur-Coffrane–Chambrelien–Neuchâtel	Swiss Federal Railways
RE7	Bern–Langnau i.E.–Lucerne	BLS
RE 7	Chur–Domat/Ems–Reichenau-Tamins–Ilanz–Disentis/Mustér	RhB
RE8	Spiez–Zweisimmen	BLS
RE 8	Chur–Domat/Ems–Bonaduz–Rhäzüns–Thusis	RhB
RE9	Spiez–Interlaken Ost	BLS
RE9	Frasne–Pontarlier–Travers–Neuchâtel	Swiss Federal Railways
RE11	Biel/Bienne–Lyss–Spiez–Kandersteg–Brig	BLS
RE12	Olten–Aarau–Wildegg–Brugg AG–Turgi–Baden–Wettingen	Swiss Federal Railways
RE 13	Klosters Platz–Saas–Küblis–Schiers–Landquart	RhB
RE 24	Klosters Platz–Klosters Dorf–Küblis–Fideris–Jenaz–Furna–Schiers–Landquart	RhB
RE24	Olten–Zofingen–Reiden–Dagmersellen–Nebikon–Wauwil–Sursee–Sempach-Neuenkirch–Rothenburg Station–Emmenbrücke–Lucerne	Swiss Federal Railways
RE33	Geneva Airport / Annemasse–Geneva–Lausanne–St-Maurice	Swiss Federal Railways
RE37	Aarau–Lenzburg–Zürich HB	Swiss Federal Railways
RE 41	Zermatt–Täsch–Visp	Matterhorn Gotthard Bahn
RE 42	Zermatt–Täsch–Visp–Brig Bahnhofplatz–Fiesch	Matterhorn Gotthard Bahn
RE48	Zürich HB–Zürich Oerlikon–Bülach–Schaffhausen	Swiss Federal Railways
RE80	Locarno–Lugano–Chiasso–Milano Centrale	TILO

== History ==
Until the 2003 timetable overhaul (December 2002 to December 2003), the RegioExpress was limited in circulation. One of the main lines which ran as a RegioExpress line (abbreviation: RX) was the Rheintal Express, from St. Gallen through Sargans to Chur (the other was the CityVogel from Zürich to Konstanz). As of the 2004 timetable overhaul, the RegioExpress was introduced as faster Regio (formerly regional) trains; the term was thrown into expanded usage. The abbreviation was changed to RE instead of the previous RX in the 2005 timetable. Recently, several companies have begun to number their RE lines, such as the TPF.

== See also ==
- Rail transport in Switzerland
- Train categories in Europe: Switzerland
