= Rhaetian Railway Ge 4/4 III =

Swiss electric locomotive

Rhaetian Railway Ge 4/4 ^{III}
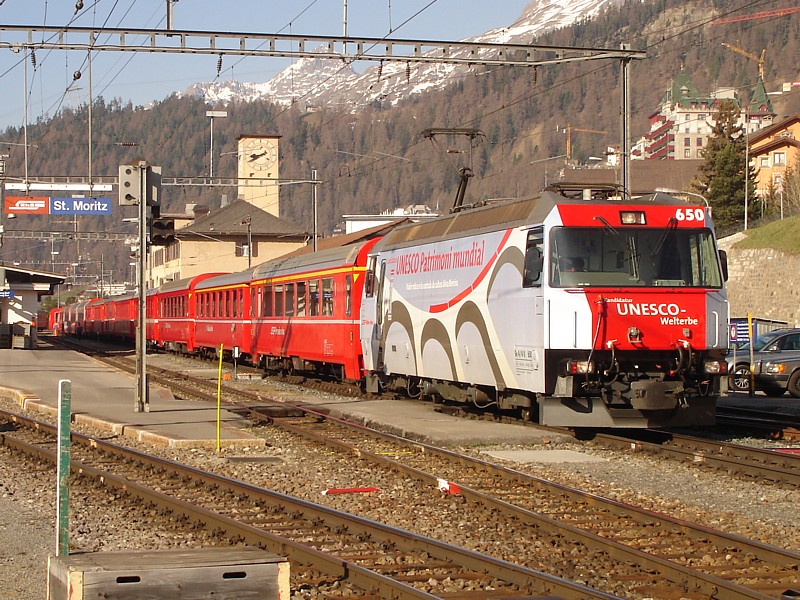
- No 650 Seewis im Prättigau at St Moritz.
Type and origin
- Power type: Electric
- Builder: SLM / ABB, Adtranz
- Build date: 1993–1999
- Total produced: 12
Specifications
- Configuration
  - UIC: Bo′Bo′
- Gauge: 1,000 mm (3 ft 3 3/8 in) metre gauge
- Length: 16,000 mm (52 ft 6 in)
- Width: 2,800 mm (9 ft 2 in)
- Loco weight: 60 tonnes (59.1 long tons; 66.1 short tons)
- Electric system/s: 11 kV 16.7 Hz AC Overhead
- Current pickup(s): Pantograph
- Traction motors: Four (type 6 FRA 5248)
Performance figures
- Maximum speed: 100 km/h (62 mph)
- Power output: 3,100 kW (4,160 hp)
- Tractive effort: 200 kN (44,960 lbf)
Career
- Operators: Rhaetian Railway
- Numbers: 641–652
- Locale: Graubünden, Switzerland
- Current owner: Rhaetian Railway
- Disposition: All still in service

The Rhaetian Railway Ge 4/4 ^{III} is a class of metre gauge Bo′Bo′ electric locomotives of the Rhaetian Railway (RhB), which is the main railway network in the Canton of Graubünden, Switzerland.

The class is so named because it was the third class of locomotives of the Swiss locomotive and railcar classification type Ge 4/4 to be acquired by the Rhaetian Railway. According to that classification system, Ge 4/4 denotes a narrow gauge electric adhesion locomotive with a total of four axles, all of which are drive axles.

== History ==
In order to manage the sharp increase in traffic on its network after the opening of the Vereina Tunnel, the Rhaetian Railway joined in 1989 with Swiss Locomotive and Machine Works and ASEA Brown Boveri, to develop a new generation of electric locomotives, the drive train of which was to be based upon AC technology with GTO Thyristors. The original plan for a six axle variant of the Ge 4/4 ^{II}, which would have had benefits on the nearly straight section of line through the tunnel, was rejected, in favour of a universally deployable locomotive with four axles, which could also be used on sections with tight radius curves. The result was the Ge 4/4 ^{III} class.

On 7 December 1993, the first Ge 4/4 ^{III} machine, no 641, was officially put into service. Between 1994 and 1999, eleven further locomotives followed, in three series, and were given numbers 642 to 652. The first of these further orders, made in 1989, consisted of six locomotives, and the second further order, in 1990, was for three. The third, placed with Adtranz in 1996, was intended to cover the additional demand due to the opening of the Vereina Tunnel, and was for another three machines.

The Ge 4/4 ^{III}s are now found at the head of almost all of the train sets on the Albula Railway, and they are the only locomotives used to haul car trains through the Vereina Tunnel. All of the locomotives in the class are currently decorated with colourful advertising liveries.

== Accidents and incidents ==
On 13 August 2014, No. 651 was hauling a passenger train that was struck by a landslide and derailed at Tiefencastel, Graubünden. Eleven people were injured.

== Technical details ==
The class was designed for 11 kV AC at a frequency of 16 2/3 Hz, and with a top speed of 100 kilometres per hour (62 mph). The Ge 4/4 ^{III}s weigh 62 tonnes (61 long tons; 68 short tons) and have an output of 2,400 kilowatts (3,200 hp) at 80 kilometres per hour (50 mph). They are 16,000 millimetres (630 in) long and 3,860 millimetres (152 in) high. Their control technology corresponds almost completely with that of the SBB-CFF-FFS Re 460 class of locomotive.

The 12 locomotives were given names of small communities in Graubünden, on the territory of which the Rhaetian Railway operates. Depending upon the livery applied to each particular locomotive, the names are applied at various places on the right and left sides of the vehicle, with the traffic number between 641 and 652 applied to each front end, and also on the lower sides. Beside the name on each locomotive is also the emblem of the particular place.

Similar locomotives operate also on the Bière–Apples–Morges Railway (BAM), (French: Chemin de fer Bière-Apples-Morges), as Ge 4/4 Nos. 21 and 22, as well as on the Montreux–Lenk im Simmental line, (French: ligne Montreux–Lenk im Simmental; German: Bahnstrecke Montreux–Lenk im Simmental), as Ge 4/4 Nos. 8001–8004.

== List of locomotives ==
The following locomotives in the class are in operation on the Rhaetian Railway:

List of Ge 4/4 ^{III} locomotives of the Rhaetian Railway
Road number	Name	Coat of arms	Commissioning	Status	Advertising livery		
					December 2010	August 2016	August 2017
641	Maienfeld		07.12.1993	in service	Coop		-
642	Breil/Brigels		24.01.1994	in service	Self-promotion: RhB Team	-	-
643	Vals		22.02.1994	in service	Ems-Chemie		
644	Savognin		14.04.1994	in service	Radio e Televisiun Rumantscha		
645	Tujetsch		31.05.1994	in service	Radio e Televisiun Rumantscha		
646	Santa Maria Val Müstair		27.06.1994	in service	Self-promotion: BÜGA	-	-
647	Grüsch		20.09.1994	in service	Graubündner Kantonalbank		
648	Susch		05.11.1994	in service	Lanxess	None	
649	Lavin		08.12.1994	in service	Holcim		JORIMANN
650	Seewis im Prättigau		07.09.1999	in service	Self-promotion: UNESCO World Heritage		
651	Fideris		28.09.1999	in service	Self-promotion: Glacier Express		
652	Vaz/Obervaz; Lenzerheide-Valbella		05.11.1999	in service	HC Davos		

== Gallery ==
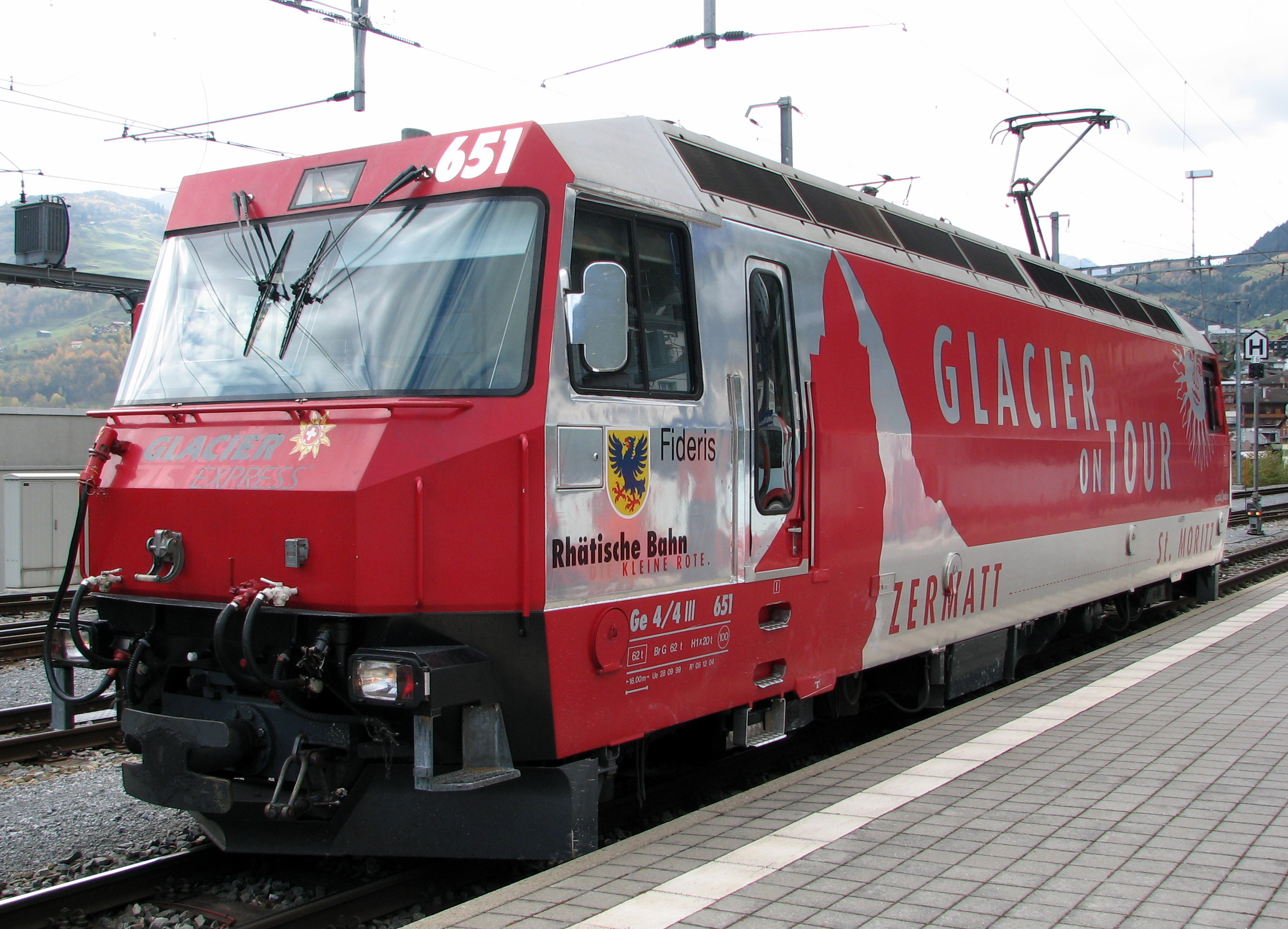
No 651 "Glacier on Tour" at Disentis/Mustér.

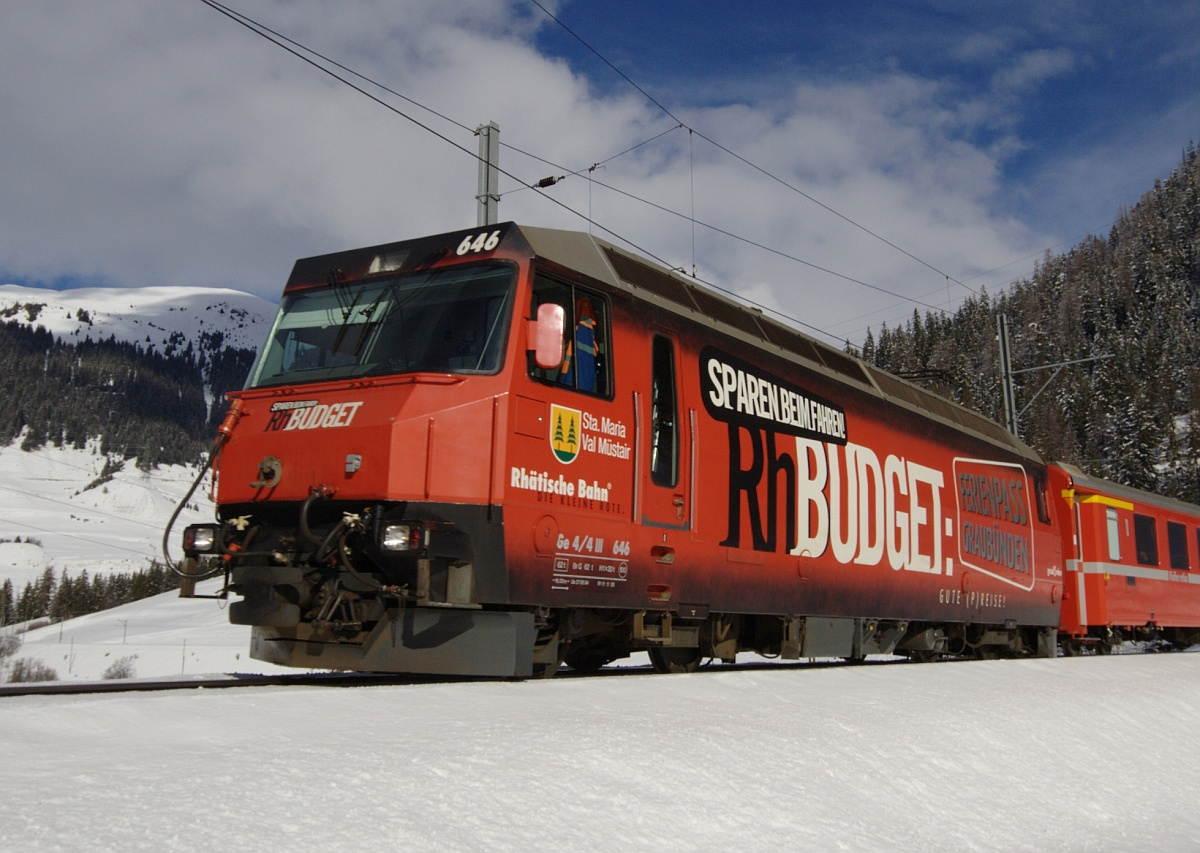
No 646 "RhBudget".

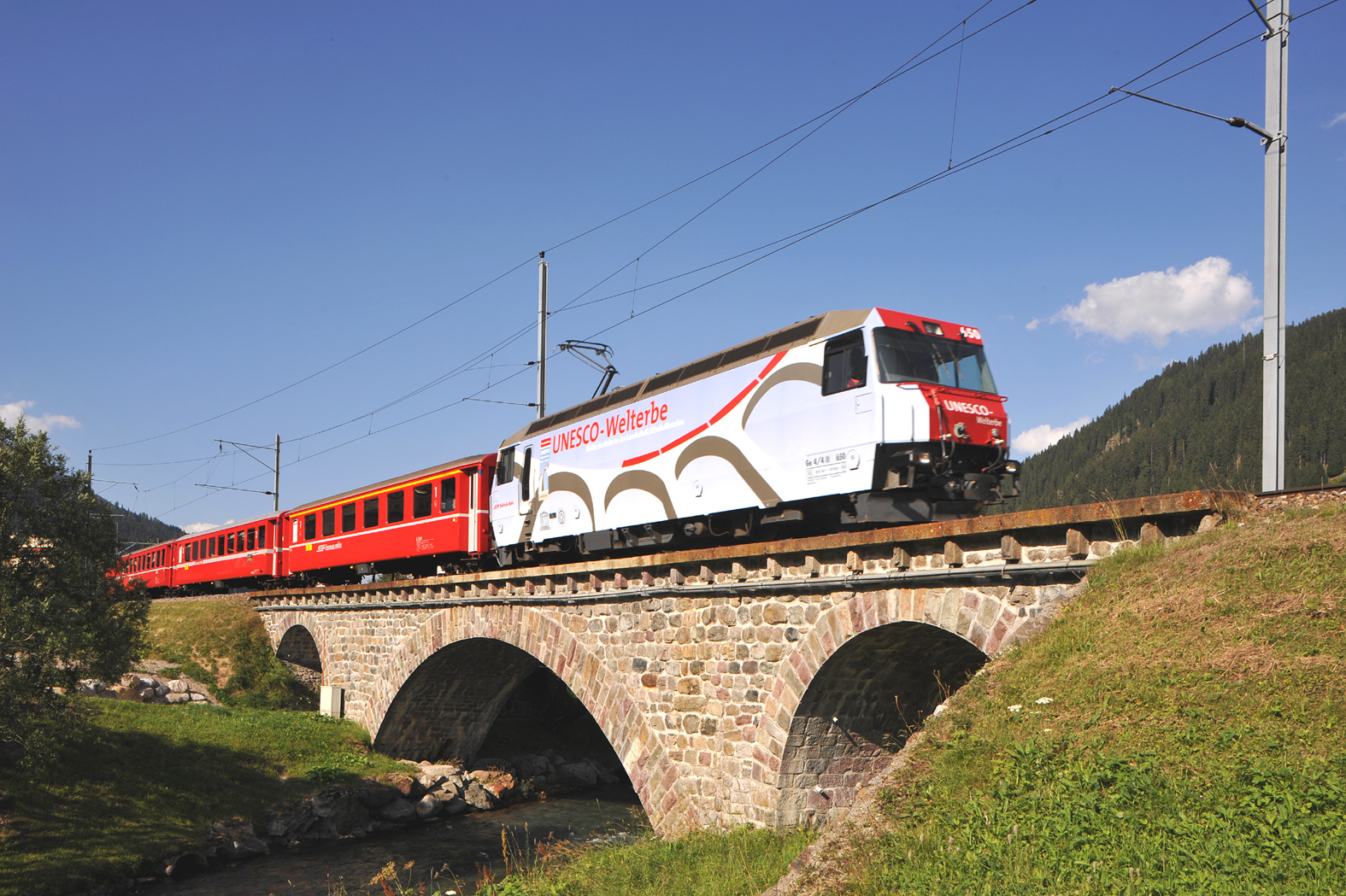
A Ge 4/4 III crossing Landwasser Bridge, near Davos.

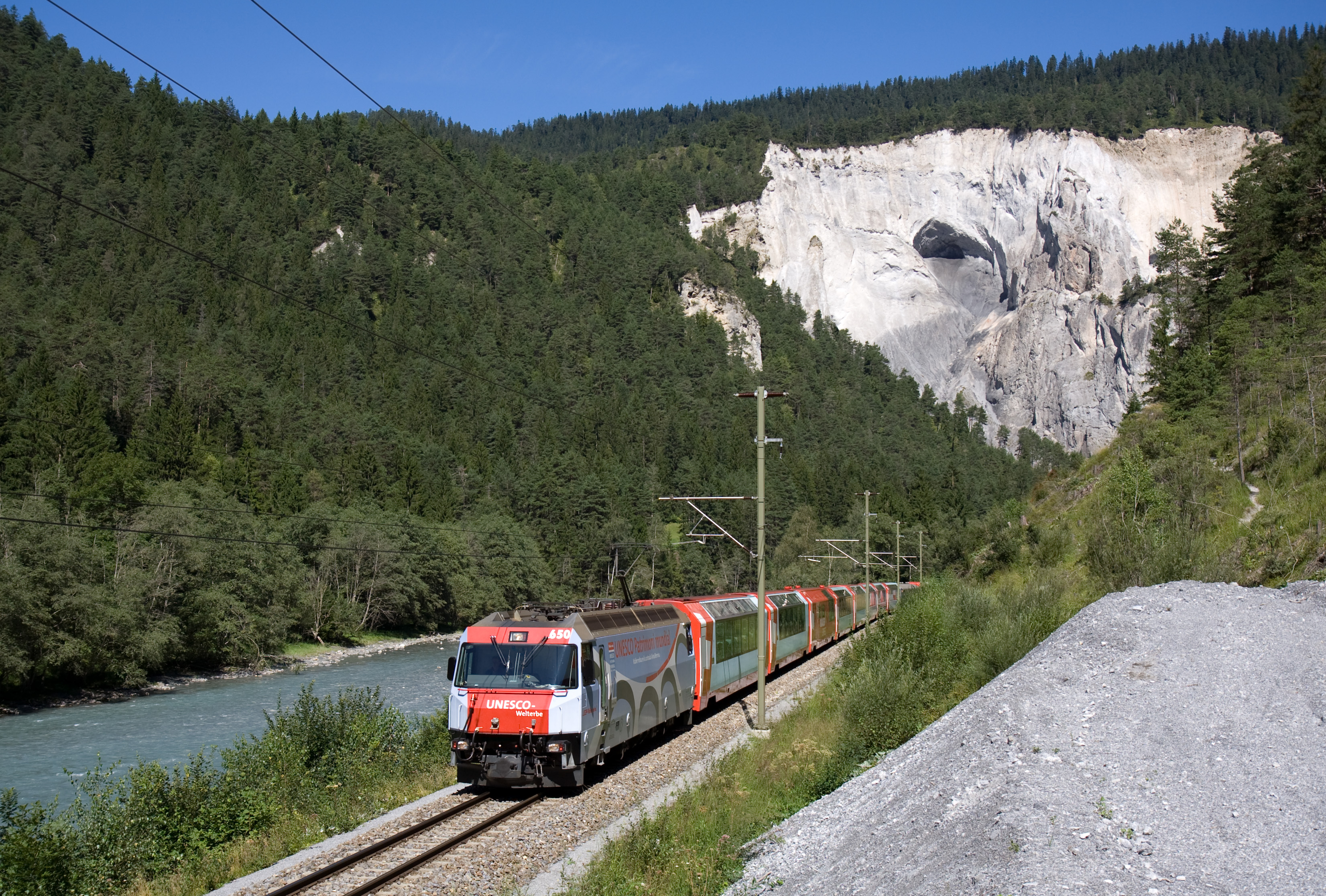
A Ge 4/4 III in the Vorderrhein gorge.

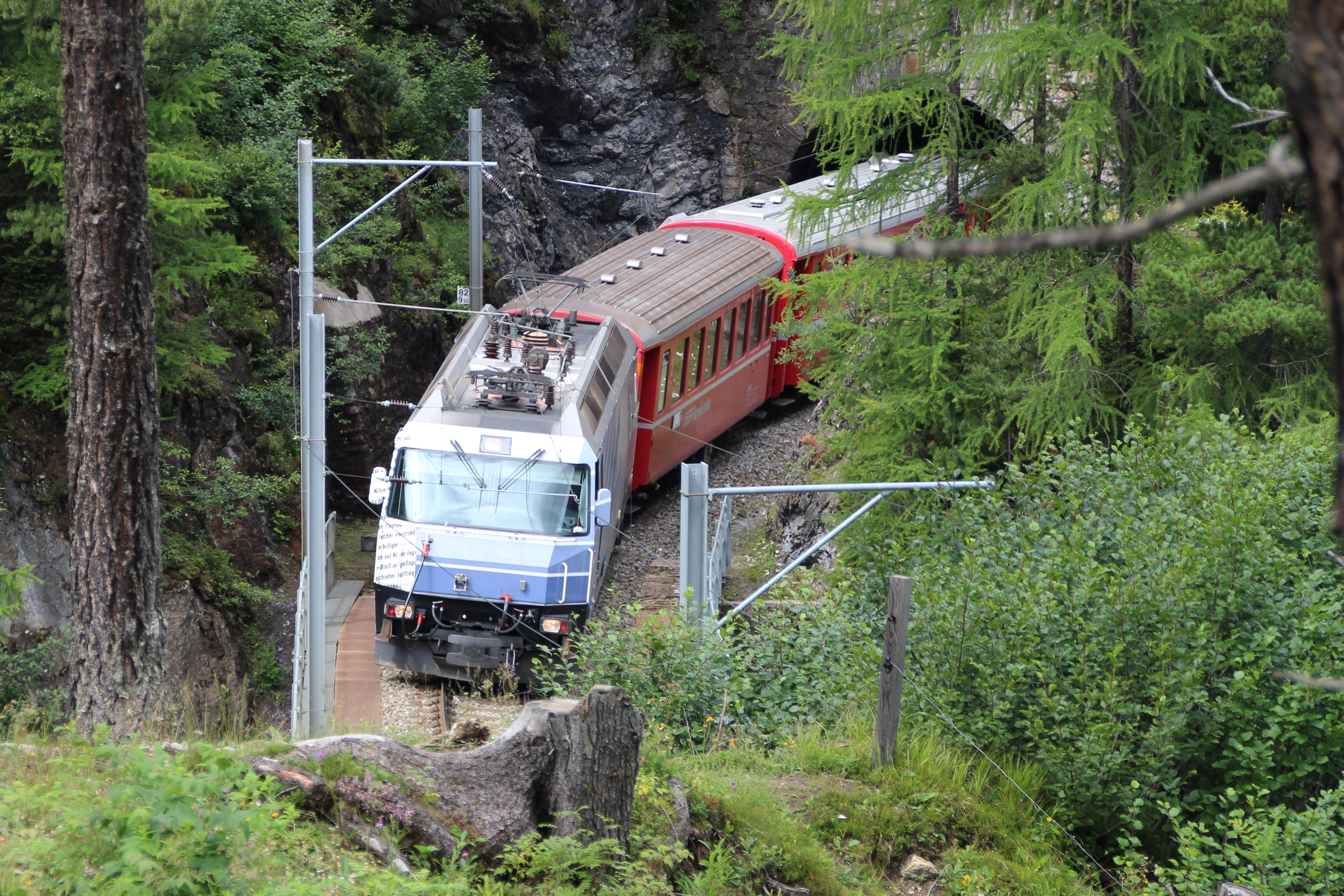
Ge 4/4 III on Albula Railway between Bergün and Preda

== See also ==
- History of rail transport
- History of rail transport in Switzerland
- Rail transport in Switzerland
