= Cavadürli railway station =

Railway station in Switzerland

Cavadürli
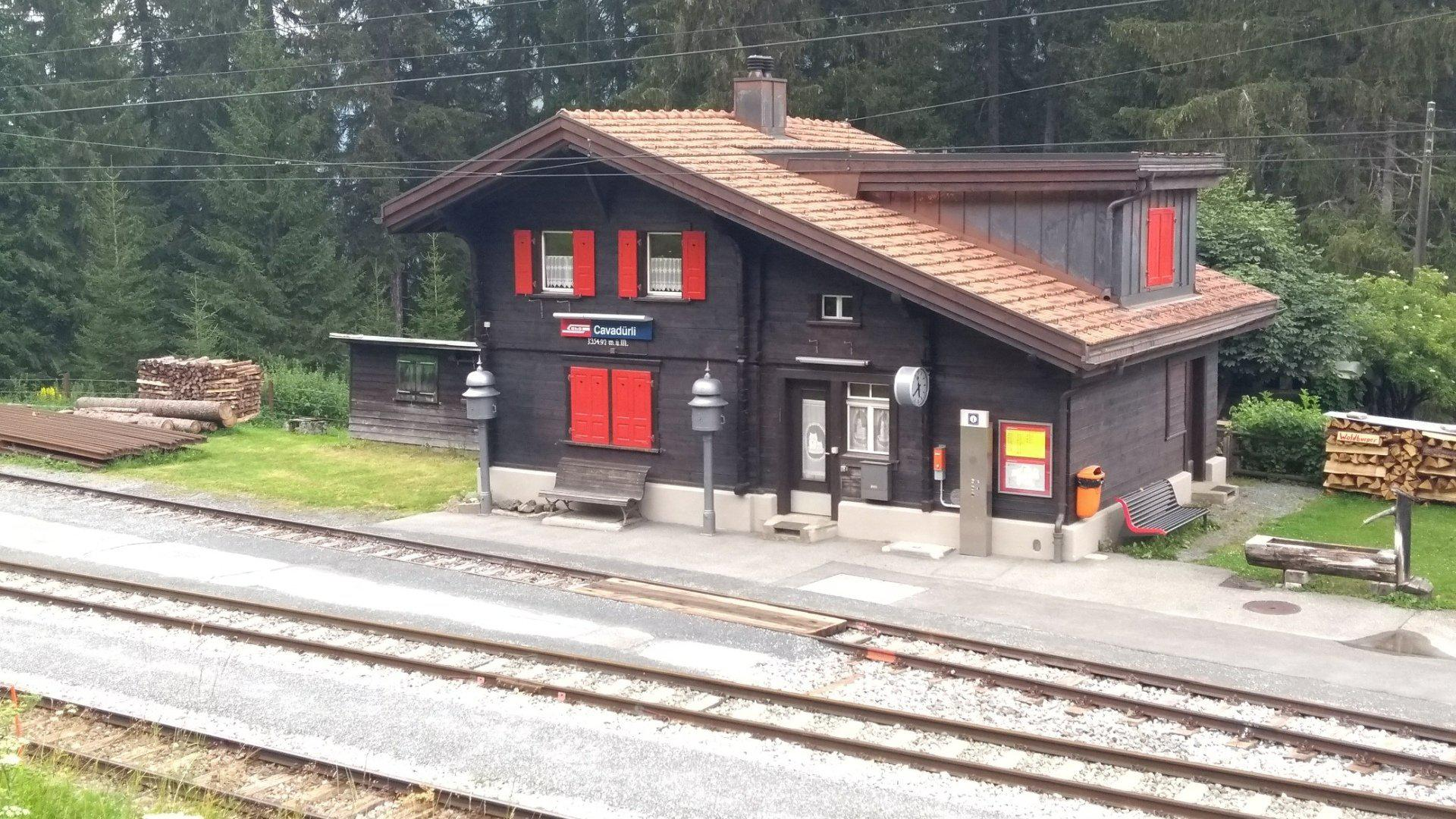
- The station in 2018

General information
- Location: Klosters-Serneus; Switzerland
- Coordinates: 46°52′13″N 9°52′05″E
- Elevation: 1,351 m (4,432 ft)
- Owner: Rhaetian Railway
- Line: Landquart–Davos Platz line
- Distance: 36.6 km (22.7 mi) from Landquart
- Train operators: Rhaetian Railway

History
- Opened: 21 July 1890; 136 years ago
- Electrified: 1 December 1920; 105 years ago

Passengers
- 2018: 50 per weekday

Services
Preceding station	Rhaetian Railway	Following station
Klosters Platz towards Landquart	RE 1	Davos Laret towards Davos Platz
Location

Cavadürli railway station (German: Bahnhof Cavadürli) is a railway station in the municipality of Klosters-Serneus, in the Swiss canton of Grisons. It is an intermediate stop on the 1,000 mm (3 ft 3 3/8 in) metre gauge Landquart–Davos Platz line of the Rhaetian Railway.

== Services ==
As of the December 2023 timetable change, the following services stop at Küblis:

- RegioExpress: hourly service between Landquart and Davos Platz.
