= Davos Wolfgang railway station =

Railway station in Switzerland

Davos Wolfgang
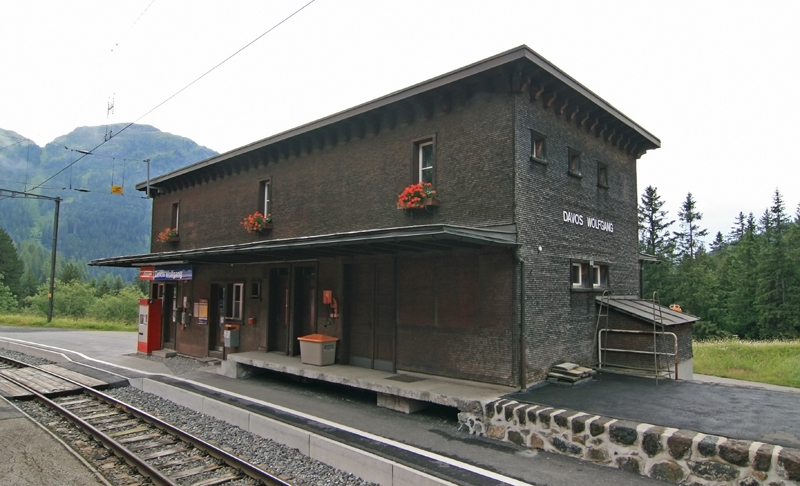
- The station in 2008

General information
- Location: Prättigauerstrasse 28; Davos; Switzerland
- Coordinates: 46°49′55″N 9°51′16″E
- Elevation: 1,625 m (5,331 ft)
- Owner: Rhaetian Railway
- Line: Landquart–Davos Platz line
- Distance: 43.7 km (27.2 mi) from Landquart
- Train operators: Rhaetian Railway
- Connections: Verkehrsbetrieb der Landschaft Davos buses

History
- Opened: 21 July 1890; 136 years ago
- Electrified: 1 December 1920; 105 years ago

Passengers
- 2018: 70 per weekday

Services
Preceding station	Rhaetian Railway	Following station
Davos Laret towards Landquart	RE 1	Davos Dorf towards Davos Platz
Location

Davos Wolfgang railway station (German: Bahnhof Davos Wolfgang) is a railway station in the municipality of Davos, in the Swiss canton of Grisons. It is an intermediate stop on the 1,000 mm (3 ft 3 3/8 in) metre gauge Landquart–Davos Platz line of the Rhaetian Railway. Trains stop at this station every two hours.

== Services ==
As of the December 2023 timetable change, the following services stop at Davos Wolfgang:

- RegioExpress: hourly service between Landquart and Davos Platz.
