= Davos Laret railway station =

Railway station in Switzerland

Davos Laret
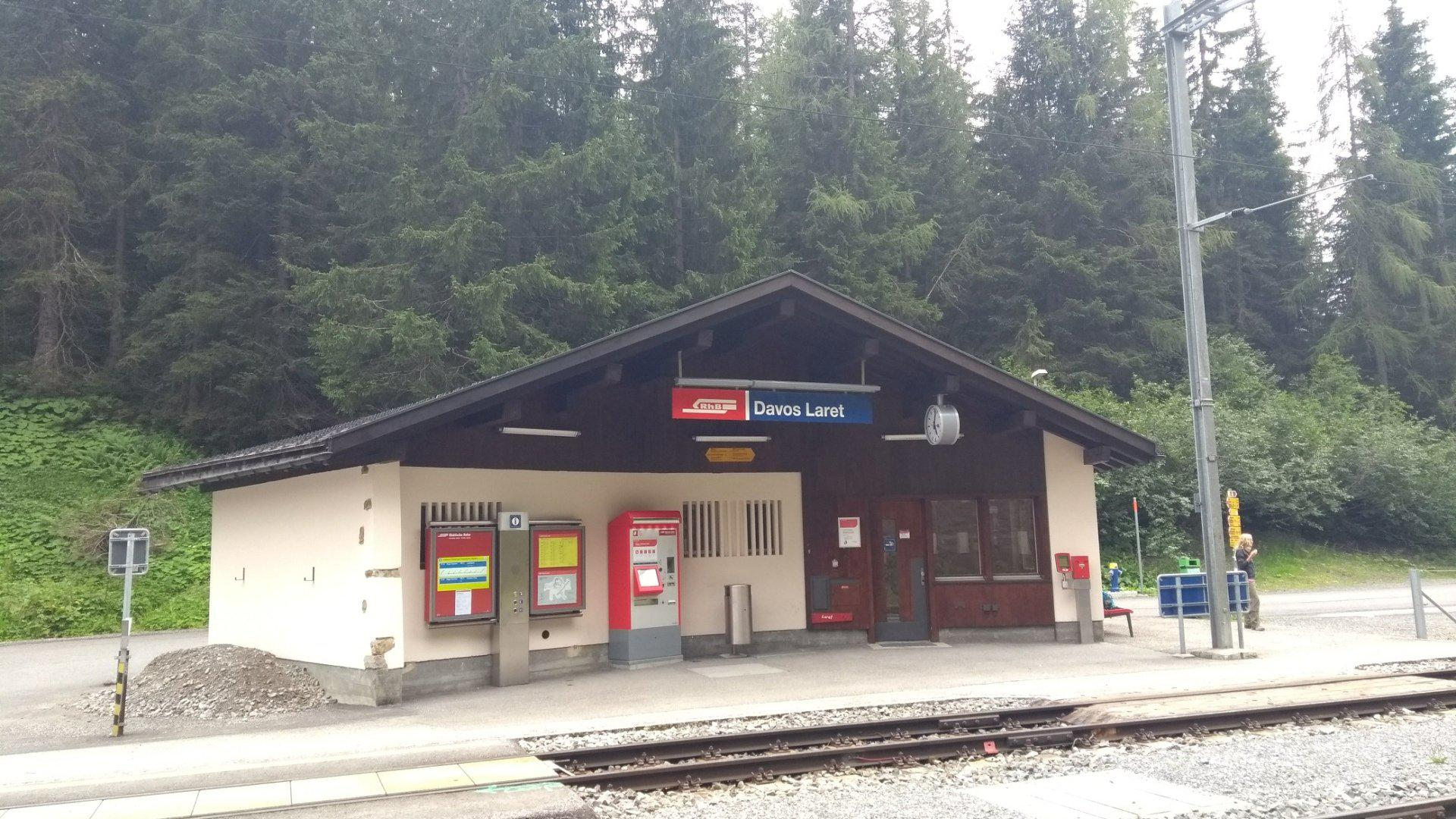
- The station in 2018

General information
- Location: Lareterstrasse; Davos; Switzerland
- Coordinates: 46°50′54″N 9°52′24″E
- Elevation: 1,521 m (4,990 ft)
- Owner: Rhaetian Railway
- Line: Landquart–Davos Platz line
- Distance: 40.8 km (25.4 mi) from Landquart
- Train operators: Rhaetian Railway

History
- Opened: 21 July 1890; 136 years ago
- Electrified: 1 December 1920; 105 years ago

Passengers
- 2018: 60 per weekday

Services
Preceding station	Rhaetian Railway	Following station
Cavadürli towards Landquart	RE 1	Davos Wolfgang towards Davos Platz
Location

Davos Laret railway station (German: Bahnhof Davos Laret) is a railway station in the municipality of Davos, in the Swiss canton of Grisons. It is an intermediate stop on the 1,000 mm (3 ft 3 3/8 in) metre gauge Landquart–Davos Platz line of the Rhaetian Railway.

== Services ==
As of the December 2023 timetable change, the following services stop at Davos Laret:

- RegioExpress: hourly service between Landquart and Davos Platz.
