= Sagliains railway station =

Railway station in Switzerland

Sagliains
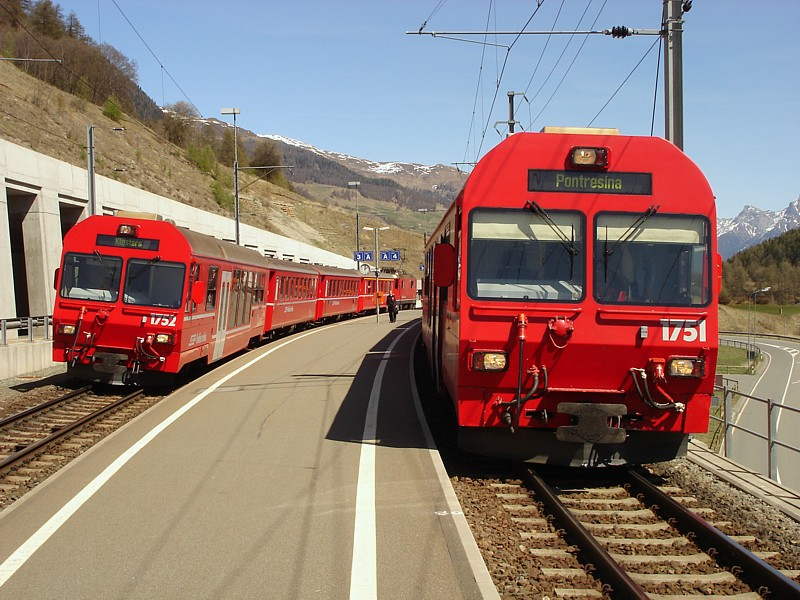
- Two trains at the station in 2007

General information
- Location: Zernez; Switzerland
- Coordinates: 46°45′48″N 10°05′48″E
- Elevation: 1,432 m (4,698 ft)
- Owner: Rhaetian Railway
- Lines: Bever–Scuol-Tarasp; Vereina Tunnel
- Distance: 54.5 km (33.9 mi) from Landquart (via the Vereina Tunnel); 126.8 km (78.8 mi) from Landquart (via Thusis)
- Train operators: Rhaetian Railway

History
- Opened: 22 November 1999

Passengers
- 2018: 1,200 per weekday

Services
Preceding station	Rhaetian Railway	Following station
Klosters Platz towards Landquart	RE 4	Lavin towards Scuol-Tarasp
Susch towards Pontresina	R 15	Lavin towards Scuol-Tarasp
Klosters Selfranga Terminus	Car shuttle	Terminus
Location

Sagliains railway station is a connecting station on the Bever–Scuol-Tarasp railway in Sagliains, Switzerland. It is located at km 128.67 at 1432 m above sea level at the exit from the Sagliains valley between the villages and stations of Susch and Lavin in the Lower Engadine. It was built on material removed during the construction of the Vereina Tunnel. Sagliains station was opened to timetabled traffic with the Vereina tunnel on November 22, 1999.

Sagliains station's main business is the operation of the Vereina car shuttle train to Klosters Selfranga. The car loading station is equipped with two loading tracks next to a loading ramp, which stretches along the valley slope. It has a direct connection to the main road through a car tunnel and a covered gallery, which serves, among other things, the waiting road vehicles and has offices for cashiers. There is also a service building with a self-service kiosk. In addition to the transport of cars, Sagliains station also serves as an interchange station between the Scuol-Tarasp–Pontresina regional services and the Scuol-Tarasp–Landquart–Chur–Disentis regional express services.

As a rare example of an interchange-only station, it only has an island platform without access from the outside. Thus, it is not normally possible to use this station for embarking and disembarking, except for changing trains.

Other examples are Manulla Junction railway station in Ireland, Smallbrook Junction railway station in the UK, Newark Liberty International Airport Station in New Jersey and the transfer platform at Pittsburg/Bay Point station in California.

== Services ==
As of the December 2023 timetable change, the following services stop at Sagliains:

- RegioExpress: hourly service between Landquart and Scuol-Tarasp.
- Regio: hourly service between Pontresina and Scuol-Tarasp.
- Car shuttle: half-hourly service to Klosters Selfranga.

== Gallery ==
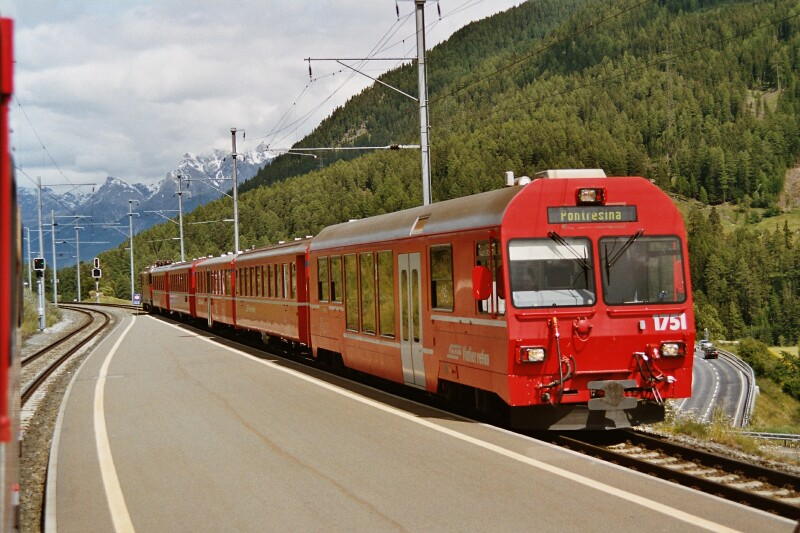
Train entering Sagliains station

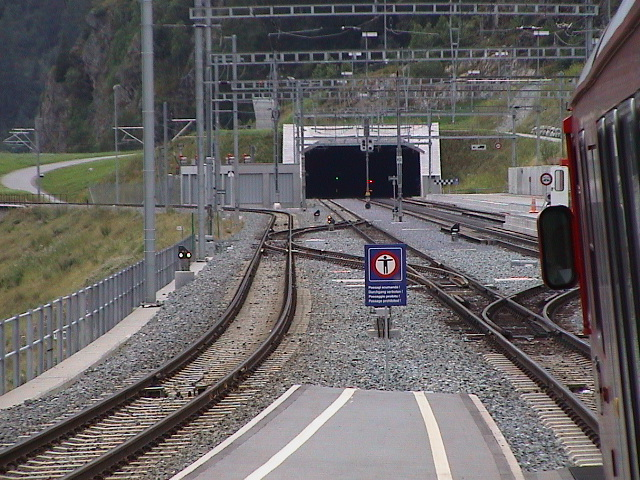
View of the Vereina Tunnel entrance at Sagliains
