= Klosters Dorf railway station =

Railway station in Klosters, Switzerland

Klosters Dorf
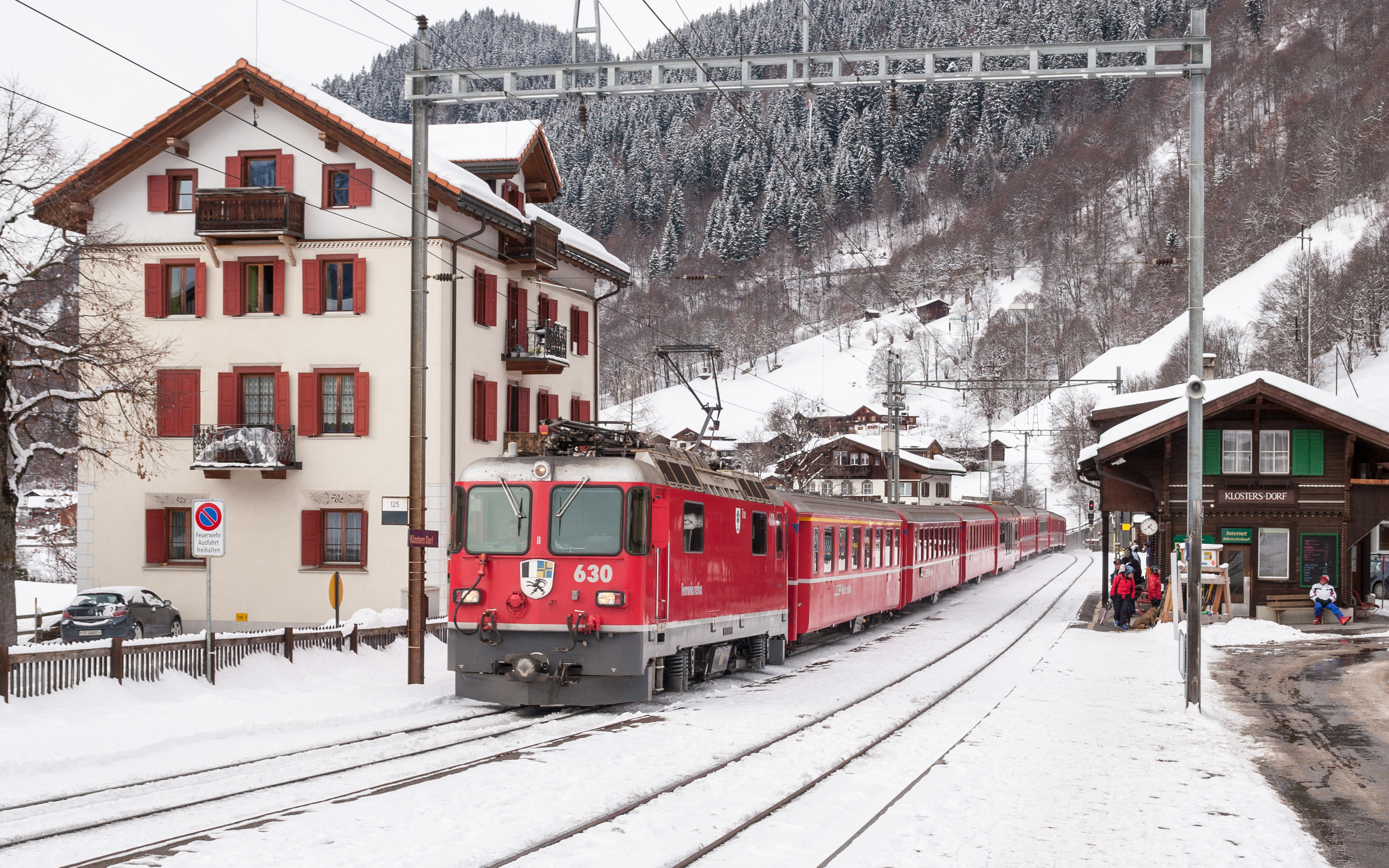
- A train arrives at the station in 2010

General information
- Location: Bahnhofstrasse 1 Klosters-Serneus; Switzerland
- Coordinates: 46°53′00″N 9°52′31″E
- Elevation: 1,123 m (3,684 ft)
- Owner: Rhaetian Railway
- Line: Landquart–Davos Platz line
- Distance: 30.7 km (19.1 mi) from Landquart
- Platforms: 1
- Train operators: Rhaetian Railway
- Connections: PostAuto Schweiz buses

History
- Opened: 9 October 1889; 136 years ago
- Electrified: 7 November 1921; 104 years ago

Passengers
- 2018: 340 per weekday

Services
Preceding station	Rhaetian Railway	Following station
Küblis towards Landquart	RE 24	Klosters Platz towards Davos Platz or Scuol-Tarasp
Location

Klosters Dorf railway station (German: Bahnhof Klosters Dorf) is a railway station in the village of Klosters, in the Swiss canton of Grisons. It is an intermediate stop on the 1,000 mm (3 ft 3 3/8 in) gauge Landquart–Davos Platz line of the Rhaetian Railway.

It is the second station in the village but is served less frequently than the adjacent larger Klosters Platz station.

== Services ==
As of the December 2023 timetable change, the following services stop at Klosters Dorf:

- RegioExpress: hourly service between Landquart and Davos Platz or Scuol-Tarasp.
