= Klosters Selfranga railway station =

Railway station in Switzerland

Klosters Selfranga
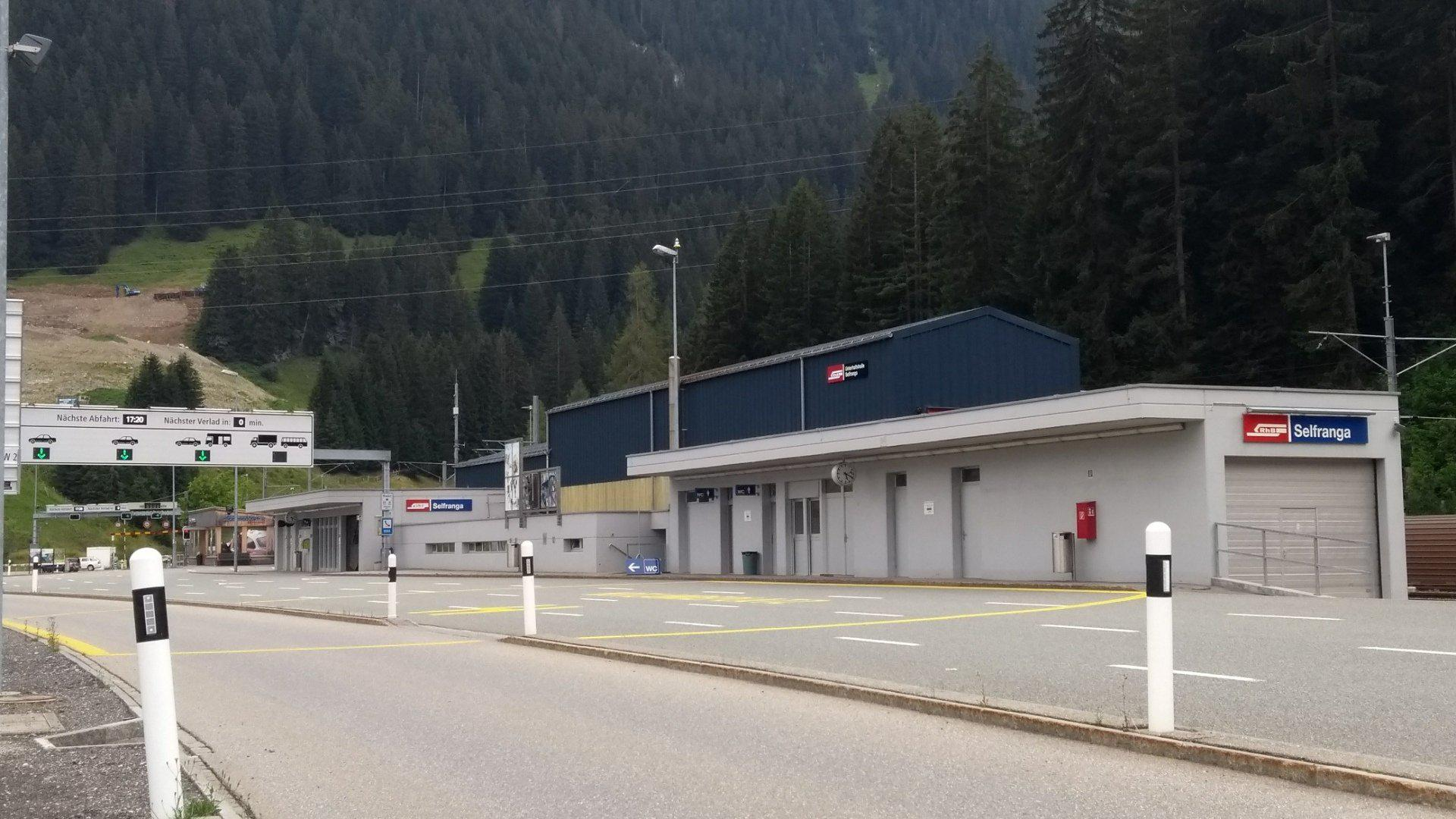
- The loading area at the station in 2018

General information
- Location: Klosters; Switzerland
- Coordinates: 46°51′21″N 9°53′03″E
- Elevation: 1,280 m (4,200 ft)
- Owner: Rhaetian Railway
- Line: Vereina line
- Distance: 35.0 km (21.7 mi) from Landquart
- Train operators: Rhaetian Railway

History
- Opened: 22 November 1999

Services
Preceding station	Rhaetian Railway	Following station
Terminus	Car shuttle	Sagliains Terminus
Location
- Location within Switzerland Location within Canton of Graubünden

Klosters Selfranga railway station (German: Bahnhof Klosters Selfranga) is a railway station in the municipality of Klosters, in the Swiss canton of Grisons. It is located on the 1,000 mm (3 ft 3 3/8 in) gauge Vereina line of the Rhaetian Railway, just short of the 19,042-metre (62,474 ft) Vereina Tunnel. The station is the northern end of the Vereina car shuttle train to Sagliains and does not serve regular passenger trains, which call at Klosters Platz.

== Services ==
The following services stop at Klosters Selfranga:

- Car shuttle: half-hourly service to Sagliains.
