= Car shuttle train =

Transport

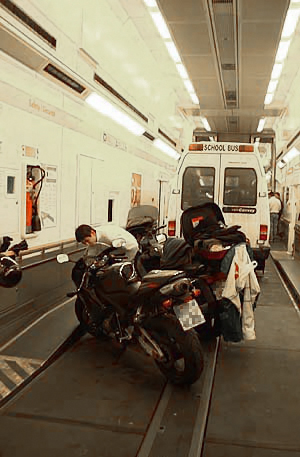
Interior of a Eurotunnel Shuttle train.

A car shuttle train, or (sometimes) car-carrying train, is a shuttle train used to transport accompanied cars (automobiles), and usually also bicycles and other types of road vehicles, for a relatively short distance.

Car shuttle trains usually operate on lines passing through a rail tunnel and connecting two places not easily accessible to each other by road. On car shuttle train services, the occupants of the road vehicles being carried on the train usually stay with their vehicle throughout the rail journey.

As such, car shuttle train services are to be contrasted with Motorail services. Unlike a car shuttle train, an Auto Train or Motorail train is a passenger train on which passengers can take their car or automobile along with them (except in France where passengers and their vehicles are transported on two separate trains). On Motorail trains, passengers are carried in normal passenger cars or in sleeping cars on longer journeys, while the cars or automobiles are loaded separately into autoracks, car carriers, or flatcars that normally form part of the same train.

== By country ==
=== Austria ===
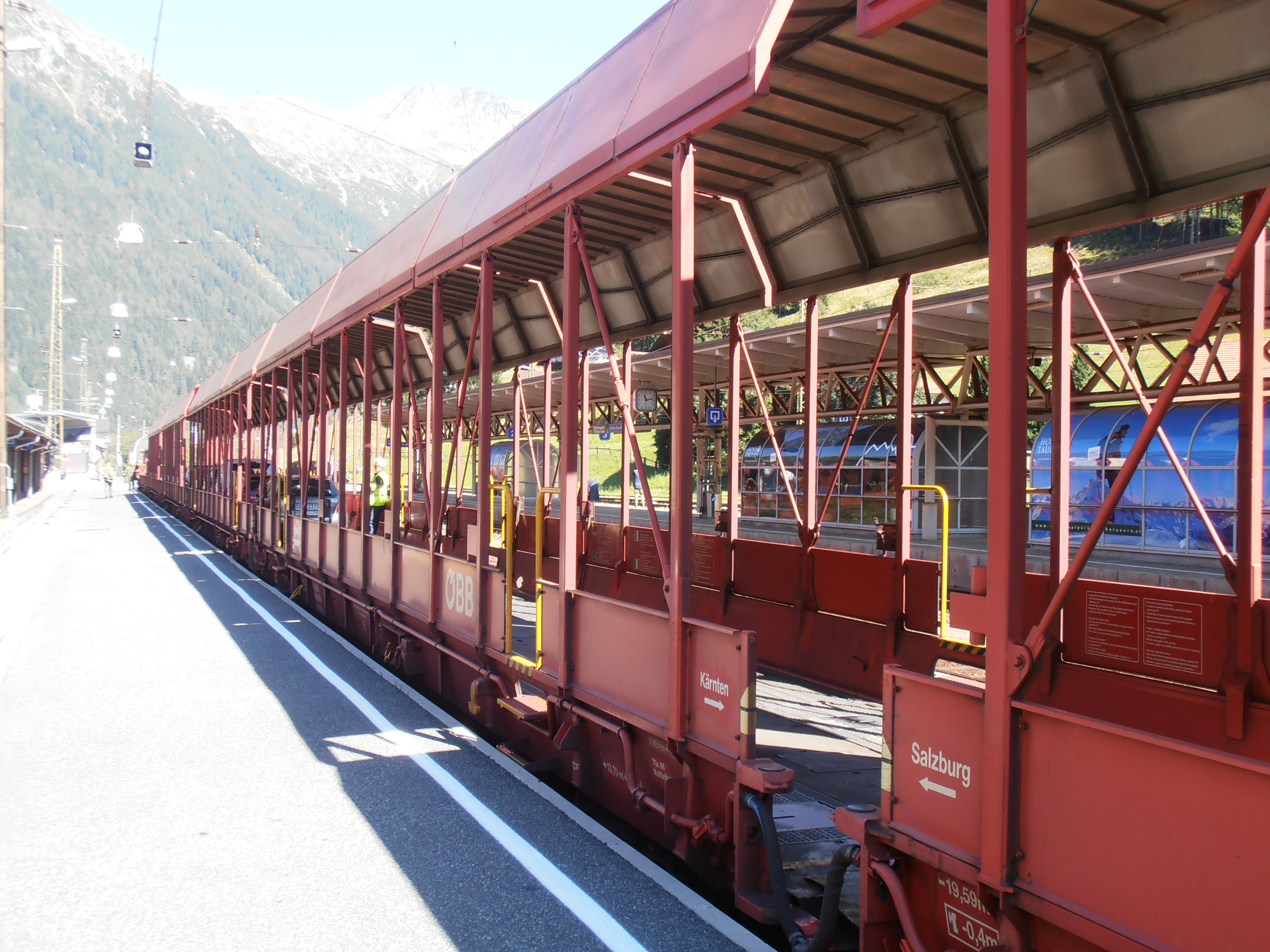
Autoschleuse wagons in Mallnitz

Böckstein, Salzburg – Mallnitz-Obervellach, Carinthia: Autoschleuse Tauern Railway Tunnel operated by the Austrian Federal Railways (ÖBB)

=== Between France and the United Kingdom ===
Accompanied road vehicles are carried in closed railway wagons through the Channel Tunnel between Sangatte (Pas-de-Calais, France) and Cheriton (Kent, United Kingdom). The car shuttle train is unique in that it is fully enclosed, and allows for double decker buses to travel in the same wagons as other regular passenger vehicles. Trucks going on the train travel in separate wagons that resemble cage-like frames, however.

=== Germany ===
The SyltShuttle operated by DB Fernverkehr and Autozug Sylt operated by Railroad Development Corporation transports road vehicles on railway wagons over the Hindenburgdamm from Niebüll, Schleswig-Holstein to Westerland in Sylt (or in the opposite direction).

=== Slovenia ===
Car shuttle trains operate on the Bohinj Railway between Bohinjska Bistrica and Most na Soči through the Bohinj Tunnel to Podbrdo.

=== Switzerland ===
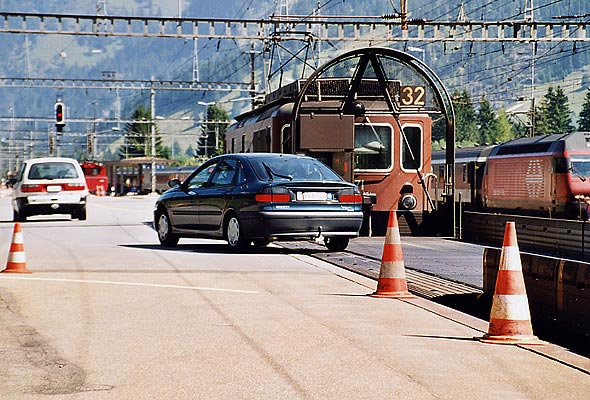
Autoverlad in Kandersteg

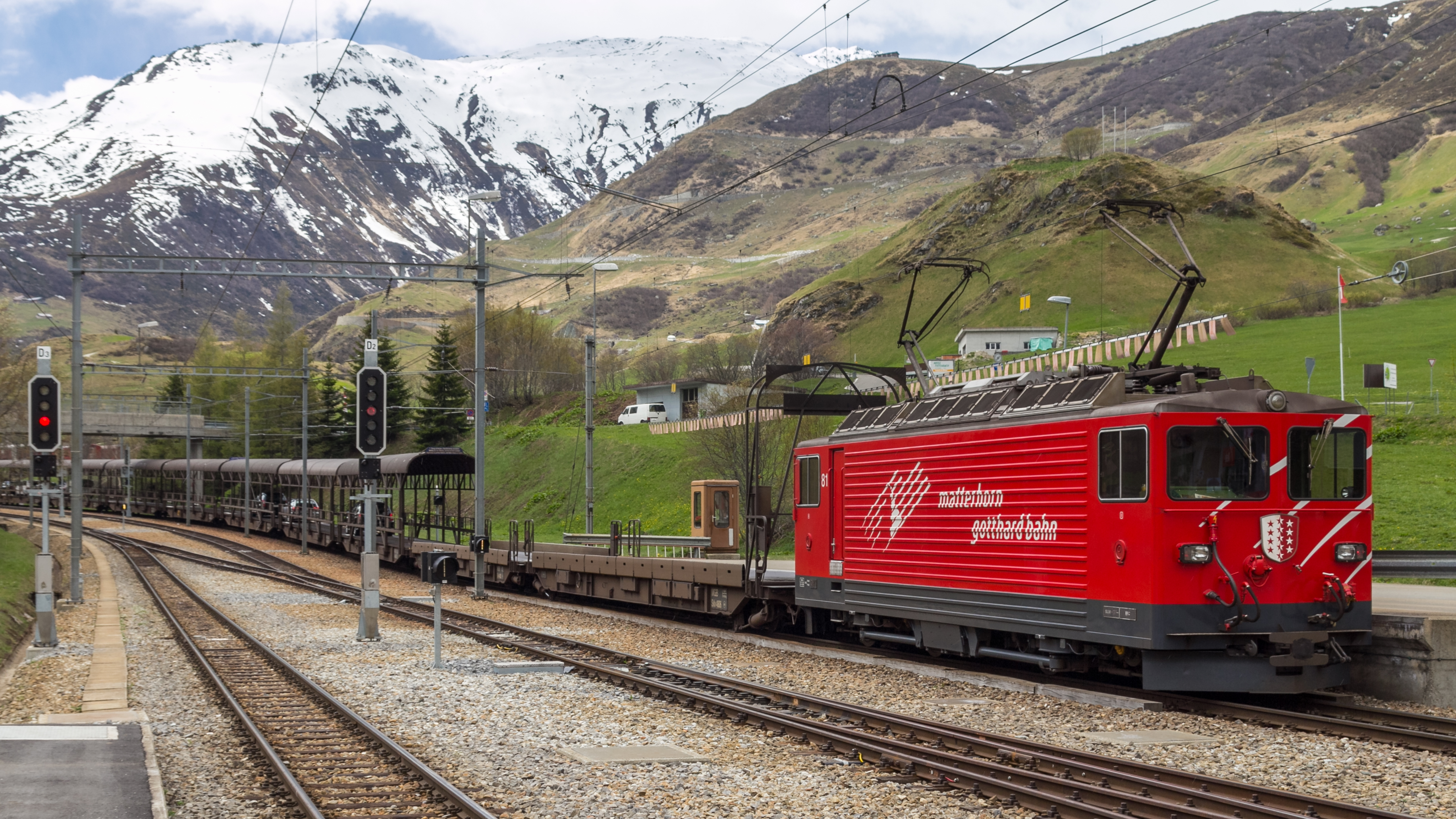
Car shuttle train of Matterhorn-Gotthardbahn at Realp station

The following car shuttle trains operate in Switzerland (mostly through tunnels):

- Brig (VS) - Iselle di Trasquera (Italy): Simplon (BLS)
- Kandersteg (BE) - Goppenstein (VS): Lötschberg (no road connection) (BLS)
- Kandersteg (BE) - Iselle di Trasquera (Italy): Lötschberg and Simplon (BLS)
- Oberwald (VS) - Realp (UR): Furka Base Tunnel (MGB)
- Klosters Selfranga (GR) - Sagliains (GR): Vereina Tunnel (instead of the drive over the Flüelapass) (RhB)
- until 2023 Andermatt (UR) - Sedrun (GR): Oberalp (only during winter while the road is closed) (MGB)
- until 2011 Thusis (GR) - Samedan (GR): Albula Railway, including the Albula Tunnel (as an alternative to the Julierpass) (RhB)
- until the opening of the Gotthard Road Tunnel in 1980, there was also a car shuttle train through the Gotthard Rail Tunnel between Göschenen and Airolo. Following the catastrophic fire in the road tunnel on 24 October 2001, this car shuttle train resumed operations for a few weeks.

=== United Kingdom ===
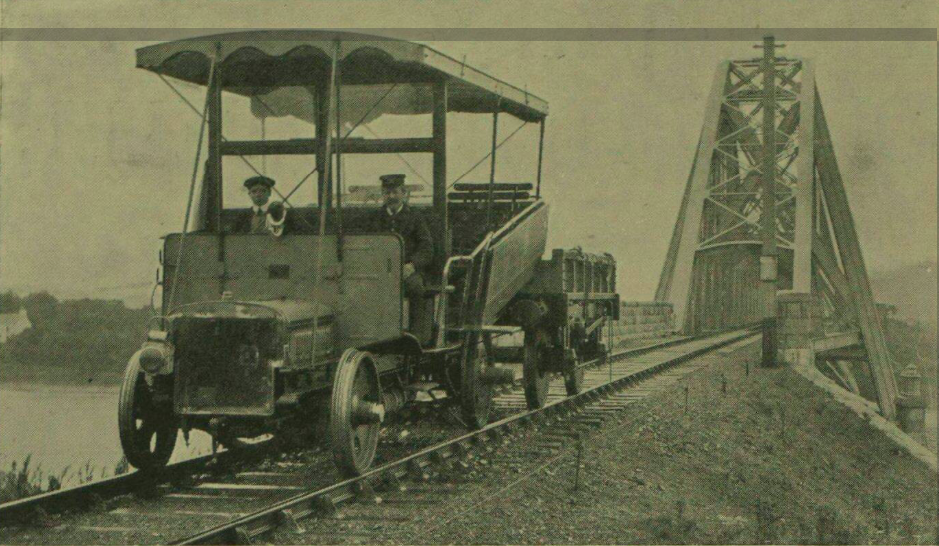
The motor vehicle transport over Connel Bridge in 1909.

In 1909 a train service started running over Connel Bridge between Connel Ferry station and Benderloch on which road vehicles could be transported. A single car was carried on a wagon hauled by a charabanc. This service survived until 1914 when a paved roadway was provided alongside the railway track over the bridge. Also, on 7 April 1909 the Great Western Railway started a formal service for the conveyance of motor cars through the Severn Tunnel. The service survived until it was made redundant by the Severn Bridge in 1966. Motorail also operated on several British Rail routes from 1955 to 2005.

=== United States ===
From the 1960s to 2000, the town of Whittier, Alaska, could be reached by vehicle by way of a train shuttle through the Whittier tunnel. In 2000, the expanded Anton Anderson Memorial Tunnel opened to shared vehicular and rail traffic.

== See also ==
- Accompanied combined transport
- Intermodal passenger transport
- Lorry-Rail S.A.
- Modalohr
- Motorail
- Rail transport
- Road transport
- Rolling highway
