= Landquart–Davos Platz railway line =

Metre-gauge railway line in Grisons canton, Switzerland

Landquart–Davos Platz
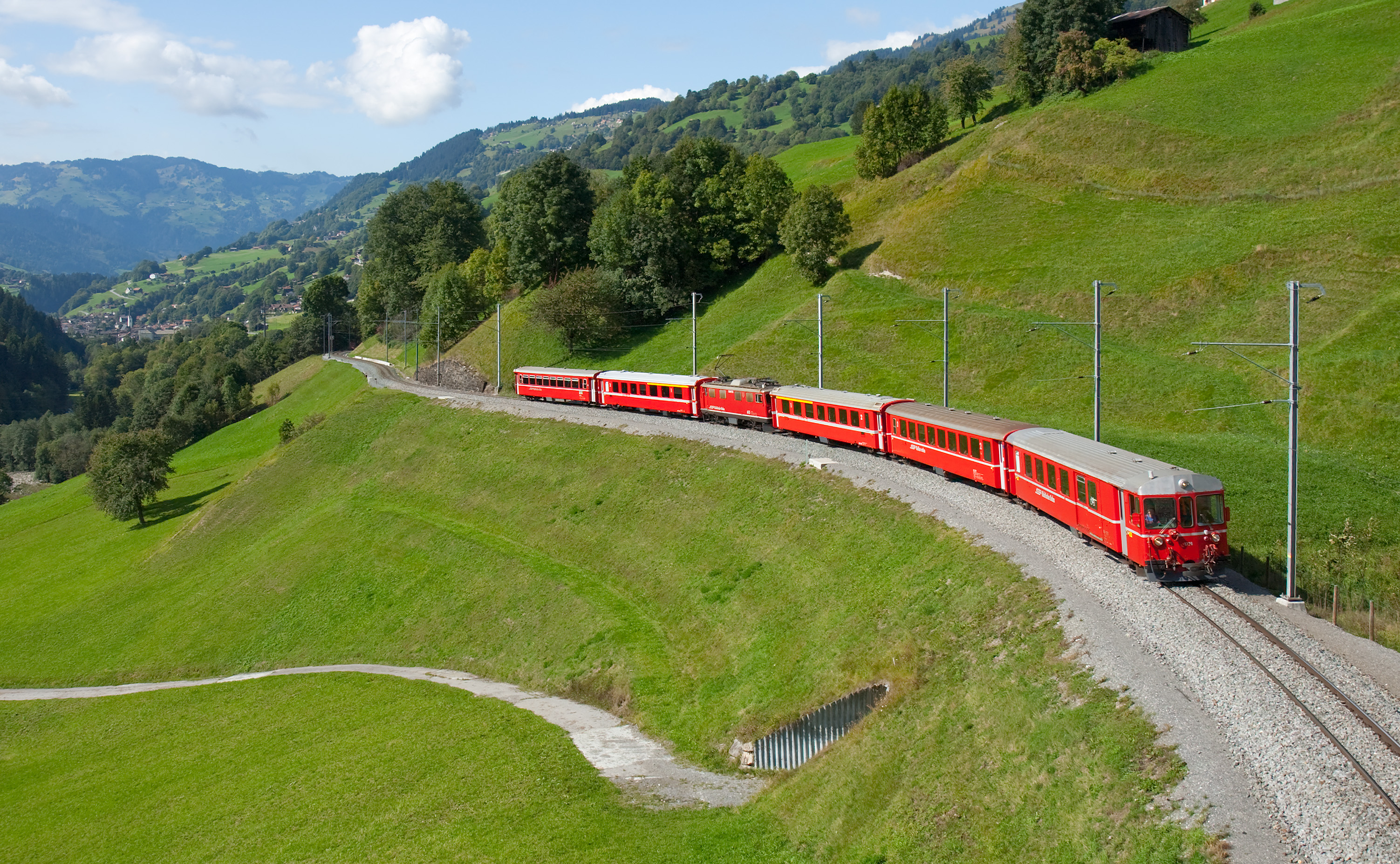
- Ge 4/4 ^{I} with a push-pull train with two extra carriages shortly before Saas; Küblis lies in the valley

Overview
- Owner: Rhaetian Railway
- Line number: 910 and 941
- Termini: Landquart; Davos Platz

Technical
- Line length: 49.978 km (31.055 mi)
- Number of tracks: Single track with Passing loops
- Track gauge: 1,000 mm (3 ft 3 3/8 in) metre gauge
- Electrification: 11 kV 16.7 Hz AC overhead catenary
- Maximum incline: 4.5%

The Landquart–Davos Platz railway line, also known as the Prättigau line (German: Prättigauerlinie) after the Prättigau region, is a metre-gauge railway line in Grisons canton, Switzerland. It is operated by the Rhaetian Railway. It has connected Landquart in the Alpine Rhine valley with the spa town of Davos since 1890.

== History ==
In 1888, Dutchman Willem Jan Holsboer (1834-1898), owner of a hotel in Davos, proposed a railway line from Landquart to Davos, envisioning that a railway would bring more visitors to the famous high valley than the horse-drawn carriages. He founded the Lanquart-Davos AG to begin construction of a standard-gauge line, but found that building it in the mountainous terrain was too costly due to the cramped conditions. Consequently on 29 June 1888, a ground-breaking ceremony took place for a narrow meter-gauge railway, Landquart-Davos Smalspurbahn. The line was opened in 1889 as far as the village of Klosters; the entire line to Davos was opened 21 July 1890.

The 50 km (31 mi) line generally follows the Landquart River valley from Landquart station to Klosters Platz station at 1,191 m (3,907 ft) and then climbs, via two horseshoe turns through curved tunnels, up to Davos Wolfgang at 1,625 m (5,331 ft) before descending to the high valley, Davos Platz, at 1,540 m (5,050 ft).

In 1895, Holsboer changed his company's name, Landquart-Davos Smalspurbahn, to the Rhaetian Railway (German: Rhätische Bahn, RhB) to reflect his plans for network expansion.

== Route description ==
The line runs east-south-east from Landquart to Davos

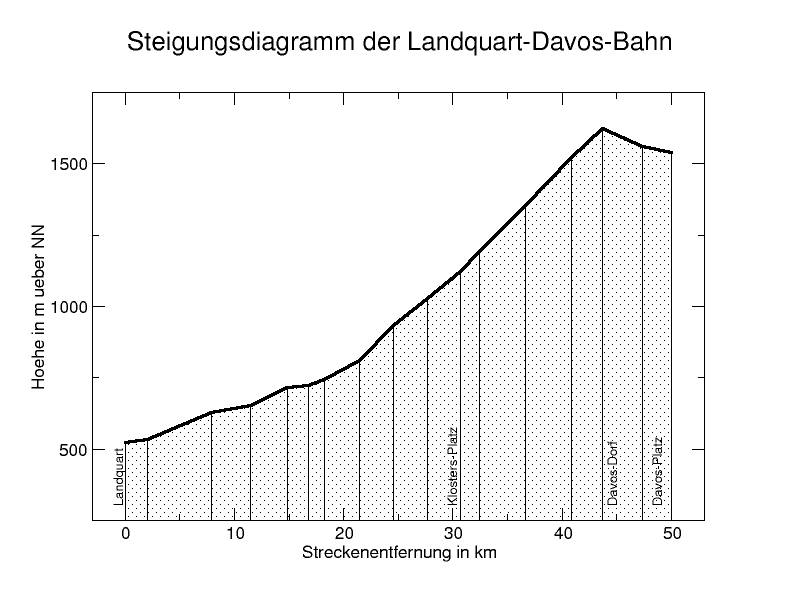
Gradient diagram of the route

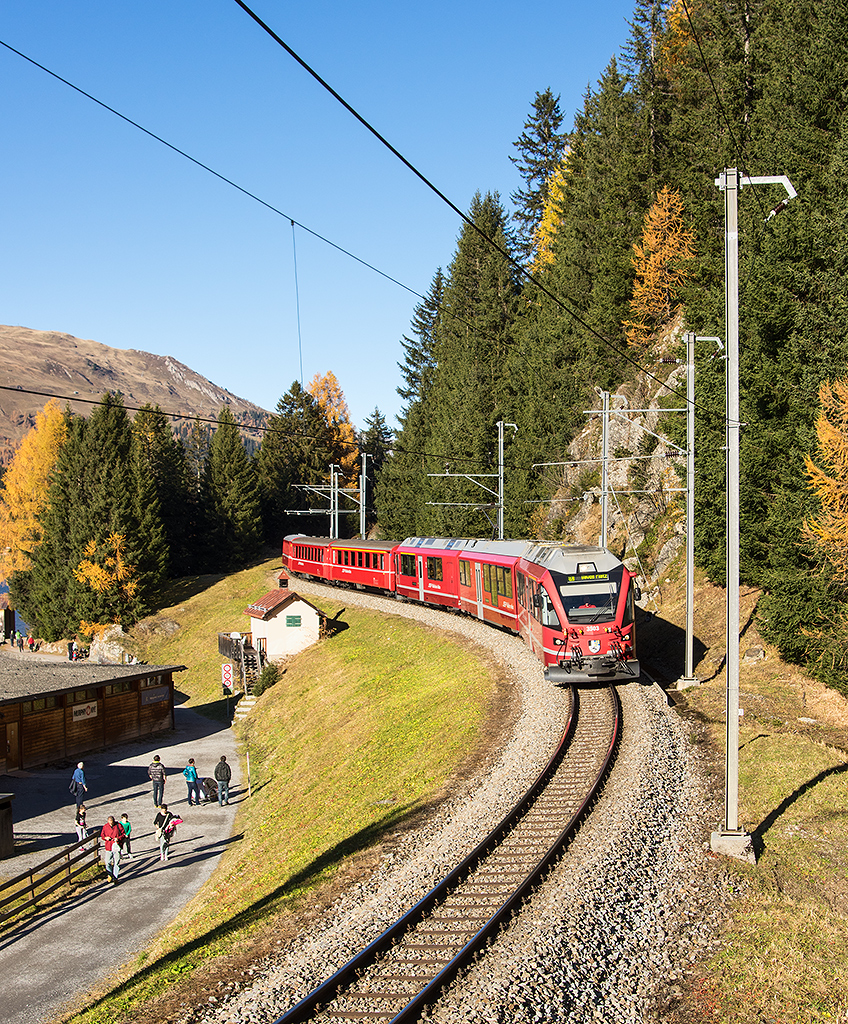
Allegra ABe 8-12 between Davos Wolfgang and Davos Dorf

Landquart station is a major rail junction, where travelers from Zürich or St. Gallen, who want to travel to Prättigau, Davos or the Vereina Tunnel to the lower Engadin can change from the standard gauge Chur–Rorschach railway of the Swiss Federal Railways to the metre-gauge trains of the RhB. Through RhB trains also run from Chur over the Landquart–Thusis railway to Klosters and Davos or Scuol-Tarasp.

There are currently six platforms in use at the Landquart station. Platforms 2, 3 and 4 are served by SBB and Platforms 5, 6 and 8 are served by RhB. Platforms 1 and 7 are not normally used.

After leaving Landquart station, the railway initially heads north, crosses the Landquart before turning east. The first 15 to 20 kilometres (9 to 12 mi) are very well developed and are approved for speeds of up to 90 km/h (56 mph). The line leaves the shore of the Landquart to run to Malans station, but then returns to it and follows the river upstream as far as Klosters Platz. The line near Malans was originally planned to run next to the Landquart, but, since the populace of Malans wanted a connection to the rail network, it provided the necessary land for the line and thus made the small detour through Malans.

Between Malans and Seewis-Pardisla railway station in Seewis im Prättigau (593 m (1,946 ft) above sea level), the line has run through the 984 m (3,228 ft) long Chlus Tunnel, which has bypassed a narrow ravine, the Chlus, since 1963. There is a parallel road tunnel for national route 28.

After Grüsch, the line reaches the three-track Schiers station following a double-track section. In 2008, the section after the station to the Fuchsenwinkel tunnel was also upgraded to double track. The line runs over two bridges over the Schraubach in the village of Schiers and over the Landquart, after which the line runs on the southern side of the Landquart.

The line passes through another 786 m (2,579 ft) tunnel before the Fuchsenwinkel crossing loop, which starts at the eastern portal of the tunnel and consists of a 460 m (1,510 ft) long siding. The line crosses the Landquart again before the next major station, Küblis.

The section from Küblis to Klosters is the second steepest section of the line with a gradient of up to 4.4%. After Serneus, the line passes just north of the award-winning Sunniberg Bridge, which is the centerpiece of the Klosters bypass road that crosses the valley of the Landquart before entering the Gotschna Tunnel. In addition, the zigzag section of the line to Davos, which makes a horseshoe turn after Klosters Platz, can be seen up the mountain. After passing through Klosters Dorf, the line reaches Klosters Platz (only Klosters until 2011) station in the suburb of Klosters Platz.

Klosters Platz, the main station in Klosters, consists of three covered platforms 1, 2, and 3. Another through track serves freight traffic. Behind the station to its south lies the unusually massive Landquart bridge "IV" on a 45° bend. It represents the fourth and final crossing of Landquart on this line. Due to the unfavourable local conditions, it was built as a timber-truss bridge with half-timbered openings. It is also called the Maag Bridge after the clerk responsible for its construction at the Rigendinger engineering firm that built it. The double-track Maag bridge crosses the Landquart and leads to two tunnels:

- The Zugwald Tunnel lies on the left (east side) and connects to the Vereina Tunnel, which was opened in 1999. This forms the centerpiece of the simultaneously opened line that connects the northern Grisons with the Lower Engadine.
- The track on the right (west side) continues the line to Davos through the 402 m (1,319 ft) Klosters curved tunnel, which completes a horseshoe turn to the northwest.

Here the gradient changes to its steepest 4.5%. After climbing above the Gotschna Tunnel, the line then makes another horseshoe turn in the opposite direction through the 334 m (1,096 ft) Cavadürli curved tunnel and continues the climb to the southeast. The crossing station of Cavadürli, which is a popular starting point for hikes, is already 160 m (520 ft) above Klosters Platz.

The line then climbs through dense forests of larch and other coniferous trees to Davos Laret station. The highest point on the line is at the stop of Davos Wolfgang at 1,625 m (5,331 ft). The line then runs downhill into the high valley and along Lake Davos to Davos Dorf station and on to Davos Platz at 1,540 m (5,050 ft). The station is the terminus of this line, where it merges into the Davos Platz–Filisur railway.

A parliamentary initiative launched in 2008 to connect this line with the Arosa Railway is currently not considered a priority by the Grisons government in the light of tight financial resources.
