= Vereina Tunnel =

Swiss rail tunnel

Coordinates: 46.793915°N 10.00174°E

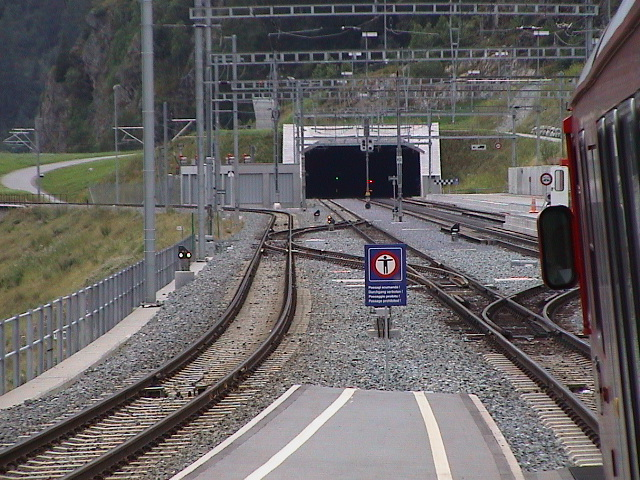
- Entrance of the Vereina Tunnel in Sagliains

Overview
- Line: Albula Railway
- Location: Graubünden, Switzerland
- Status: Open
- System: Rhaetian Railway

Operation
- Work began: 1991
- Opened: 19 November 1999
- Owner: Rhaetian Railway
- Operator: Rhaetian Railway
- Traffic: Train
- Character: Passenger and freight

Technical
- Length: 19,042 m (11.832 mi)
- No. of tracks: Single track with Passing loops
- Track gauge: 1,000 mm (3 ft 3 3/8 in)
- Electrified: Overhead catenary, 11 kV AC 16 2/3 Hz

The Vereina Tunnel is a railway tunnel, and the principal part of the Vereina railway line, in the canton of Graubünden in eastern Switzerland. It connects the Landquart–Davos Platz and the Bever–Scuol-Tarasp lines.

First proposed during 1975, construction of the tunnel commenced during 1991 and was officially completed on 19 November 1999, ahead of schedule. In the first year alone, roughly 280,000 vehicles were recorded as having used the tunnel; since then, its usage has risen to around 450,000 vehicles per year. At 19,042 metres (62,474 ft) in length, the Vereina Tunnel is the longest tunnel on the Swiss Rhaetian Railway (RhB) network as well as the world's longest metre-gauge railway tunnel.

== History ==
As early as 1975, the administrative council of the government of the Swiss Canton of Graubünden, presented the first white paper calling for the construction of what would become the Vereina Tunnel. Its construction was motivated by a desire to improve the all-weather transport links in the eastern part of Canton of Graubünden, as the Flüela Pass (between Davos and Susch) is prone to heavy snowfall and avalanches in the winter months. Once completed, it formed the first year-round rail link between the Prättigau and the Lower Engadin. The project represented the first expansion to the RhB route network since 1914. However, it was not until 1985 that sufficient support for the initiative amongst the canton's population was garnered, allowing the project to proceed through the approval process.

Following the approval of the proposal by the Swiss Parliament, a groundbreaking ceremony was held during 1991, marking the official start of construction. On the north side, a tunnel boring machine (TBM) was used; its rate of progress reportedly advanced between four and 30 meters per day, varying due to the different strengths of rock being bored through. On the south side, conventional methods were used, albeit with the application of several modern construction techniques. Amongst other notable elements, the Vereina Tunnel employed one of the most extensive uses of permanent sprayed concrete anywhere in Switzerland.

The construction schedule had called for the tunnel to be completed after nine years of work; however, a greater rate of progress than this conservative projection was achieved, thus construction was completed nearly six months ahead of schedule. This was despite the need for unplanned remedial work, such as the reprofiling of 20 m (66 ft) of the northern bore after fracturing had brought about a temporarily standstill in the work. The total cost of the Vereina Tunnel reportedly came to CHF 670 million.

On 19 November 1999, a ceremony was held, attended by various officials such as the then Federal Councillor and Transport Minister Moritz Leuenberger, to celebrate the official opening of the Vereina Tunnel. Three days later, the first scheduled trains traversed the tunnel. According to the operator, its completion shortened the journey time through the mountain to roughly 18 minutes, improving the route's attractiveness for commuter traffic, as well as better facilitating tourist access to and from the Engadin. In the first year alone, roughly 280,000 vehicles were recorded as having used the new tunnel. By 2019, the RhB were reporting that an average of just above 480,000 vehicles were traversing the Vereina Tunnel per year.

Service is based on hourly regional trains between Scuol-Tarasp and Chur, complemented every 30 minutes by car shuttle trains transporting road vehicles between the two valleys linked via the tunnel and by freight trains. The tunnel is single track, with passing loops (each 2 km (1.2 mi) long) in the middle and near the two portals. Electrification is the RhB overhead standard of 11 kV 16.7 Hz AC. Due to its length, the spatial effects of the Vereina Tunnel have been subject to studies. Since its completion, multiple safety-related modifications to the tunnel have been performed, largely due to changes in standards that have elevated safety requirements. During the 2010s, the Zurich Electricity Works established a district-heating network adjacent to the tunnel that primarily uses water drawn from area around the north portal for geothermal energy.
