= Davos railway station =

Davos railway station may refer to one of several railway stations in Davos, Switzerland:

- Davos Platz railway station
- on the Landquart–Davos Platz line:
  - Davos Laret railway station
  - Davos Wolfgang railway station
  - Davos Dorf railway station
- on the Davos Platz–Filisur line:
  - Davos Frauenkirch railway station
  - Davos Glaris railway station
  - Davos Monstein railway station
  - Davos Wiesen railway station
