= Davos Monstein railway station =

Railway station in Switzerland

Davos Monstein
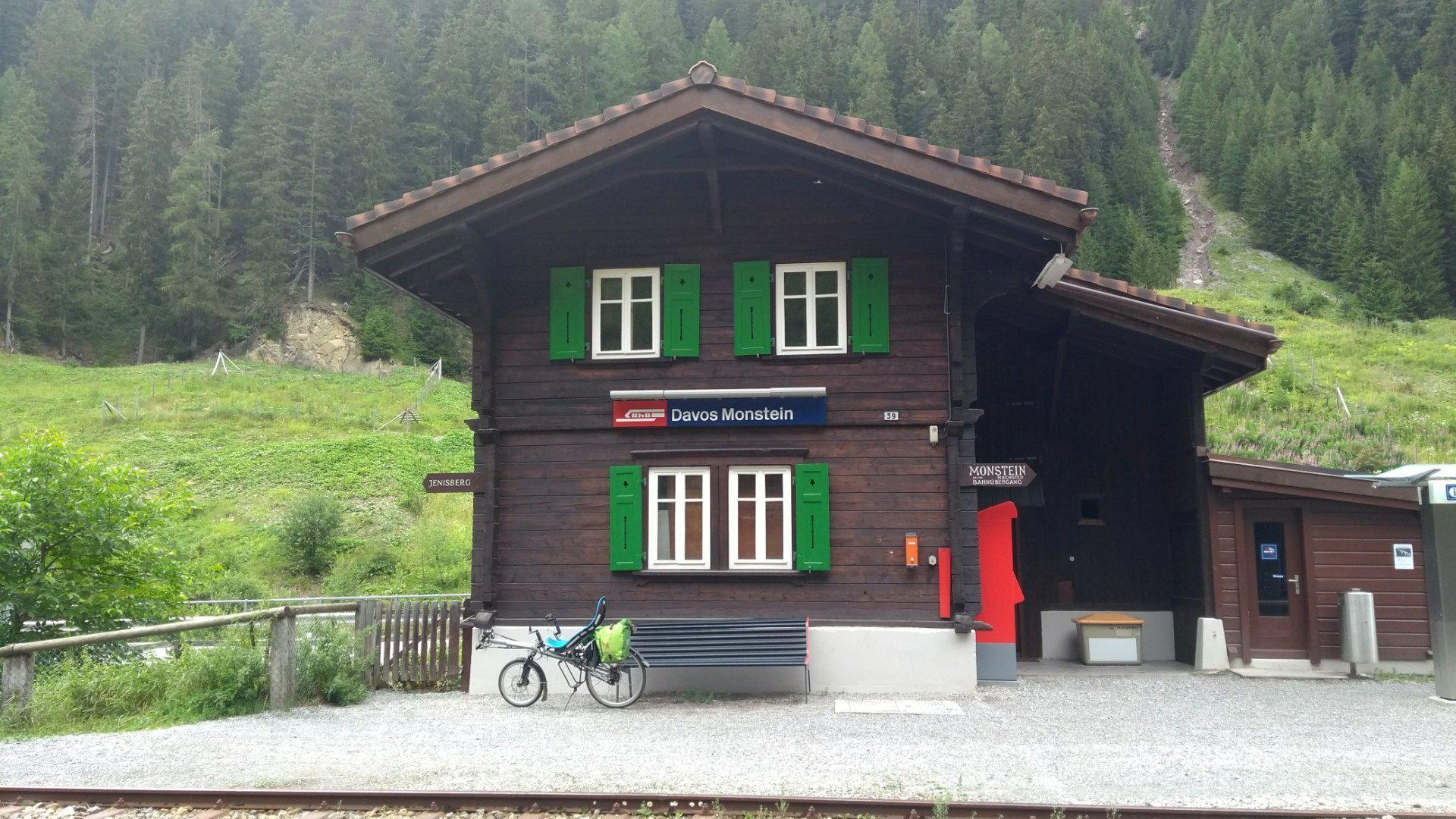
- The station building in 2018

General information
- Location: Landwasserstrasse; 7277 Davos; Davos; Switzerland
- Coordinates: 46°42′57″N 9°45′36″E
- Elevation: 1,346 m (4,416 ft)
- Owner: Rhaetian Railway
- Line: Davos Platz–Filisur line
- Distance: 60.1 km (37.3 mi) from Landquart
- Train operators: Rhaetian Railway
- Connections: PostAuto Schweiz buses

History
- Electrified: 22 December 1919

Passengers
- 2018: 50 per weekday

Services
Preceding station	Rhaetian Railway	Following station
Davos Wiesen towards Filisur	R 11	Davos Glaris towards Davos Platz
Location

Davos Monstein railway station is a railway station in the municipality of Davos, in the Swiss canton of Graubünden. It is located on the Davos Platz–Filisur line. An hourly service operates on this line.

== Services ==
As of the December 2023 timetable change, the following services stop at Davos Monstein:

- Regio: hourly service between Filisur and Davos Platz.
