= Schatzalp-Bahn =

Funicular railway in Davos, Switzerland

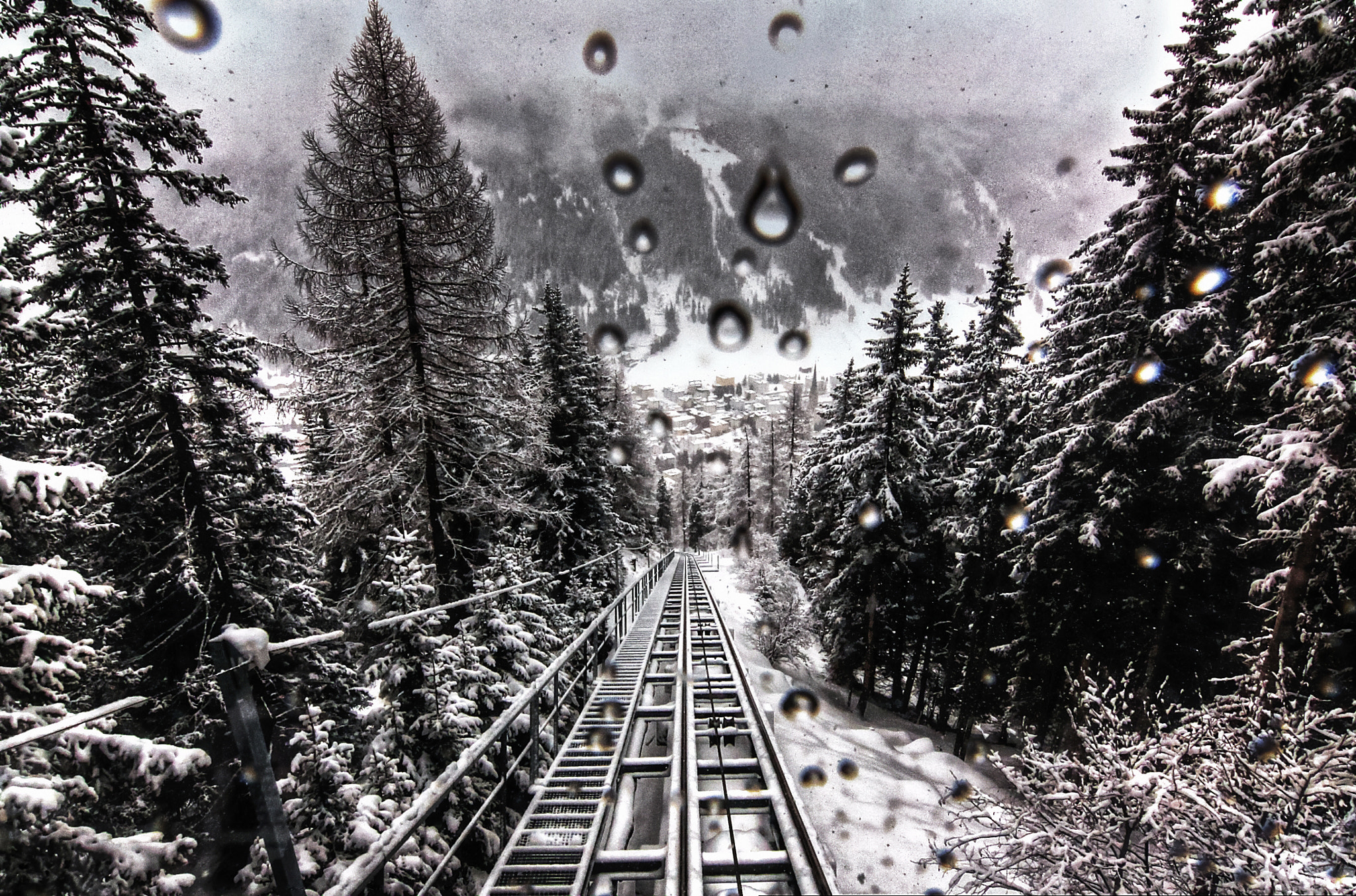
- View from the funicular downhill (2013)

Overview
- Other name(s): Davos-Schatzalp-Bahn (DSB)
- Status: In operation
- Owner: Berghotel Schatzalp AG
- Locale: Davos; Switzerland
- Termini: "Davos Platz (Schatzalpbahn)"; Schatzalp
- Connecting lines: Landquart–Davos, Davos–Filisur
- Stations: 2
- Website: Schatzalp-Bahn

Service
- Type: Funicular
- Operator(s): Berghotel Schatzalp AG
- Rolling stock: 2

History
- Opened: 1899

Technical
- Line length: 712 m (2,336 ft)
- Number of tracks: 1 with passing loop
- Track gauge: 1,000 mm (3 ft 3 3/8 in)
- Highest elevation: 1,861 m (6,106 ft)
- Maximum incline: 47.3%

The Schatzalp-Bahn is a funicular railway in Davos, Switzerland. The line leads from Davos-Platz at 1,557 m (5,108 ft) to Schatzalp at 1,861 m (6,106 ft). It has a length of 712 m (2,336 ft) at a maximum inclination of 47% with a difference of elevation of 304 m (997 ft). The funicular has two cars on a single track with a passing loop. It provides access to Schatzalp and Strela skiing area.

The funicular was completed in 1899 to provide access to the Kurhaus at Schatzalp, now Berghotel Schatzalp. It was the first funicular in the canton of Graubünden. Construction had been delayed as the concession to build the line had first been awarded to Aktiengesellschaft Kurhaus Davos and a competitor. Only in 1898 it received it exclusively. The newly created company Davosplatz-Schatzalp-Bahn then built and operated the line.

The lower station is located next to Davos Platz railway station.

Berghotel Schatzalp AG currently owns and operates the line.

== Gallery ==
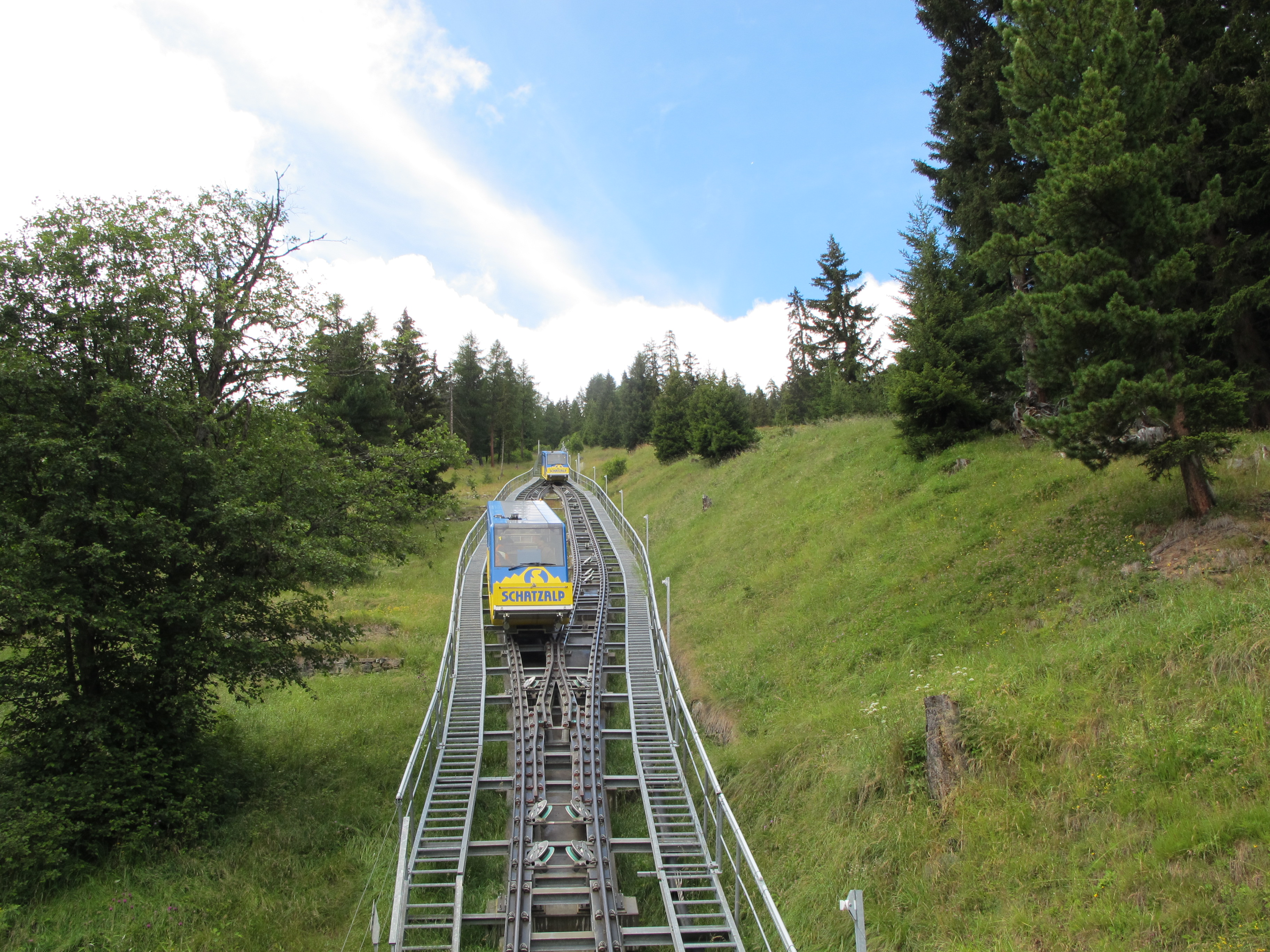
Passing loop (2011)

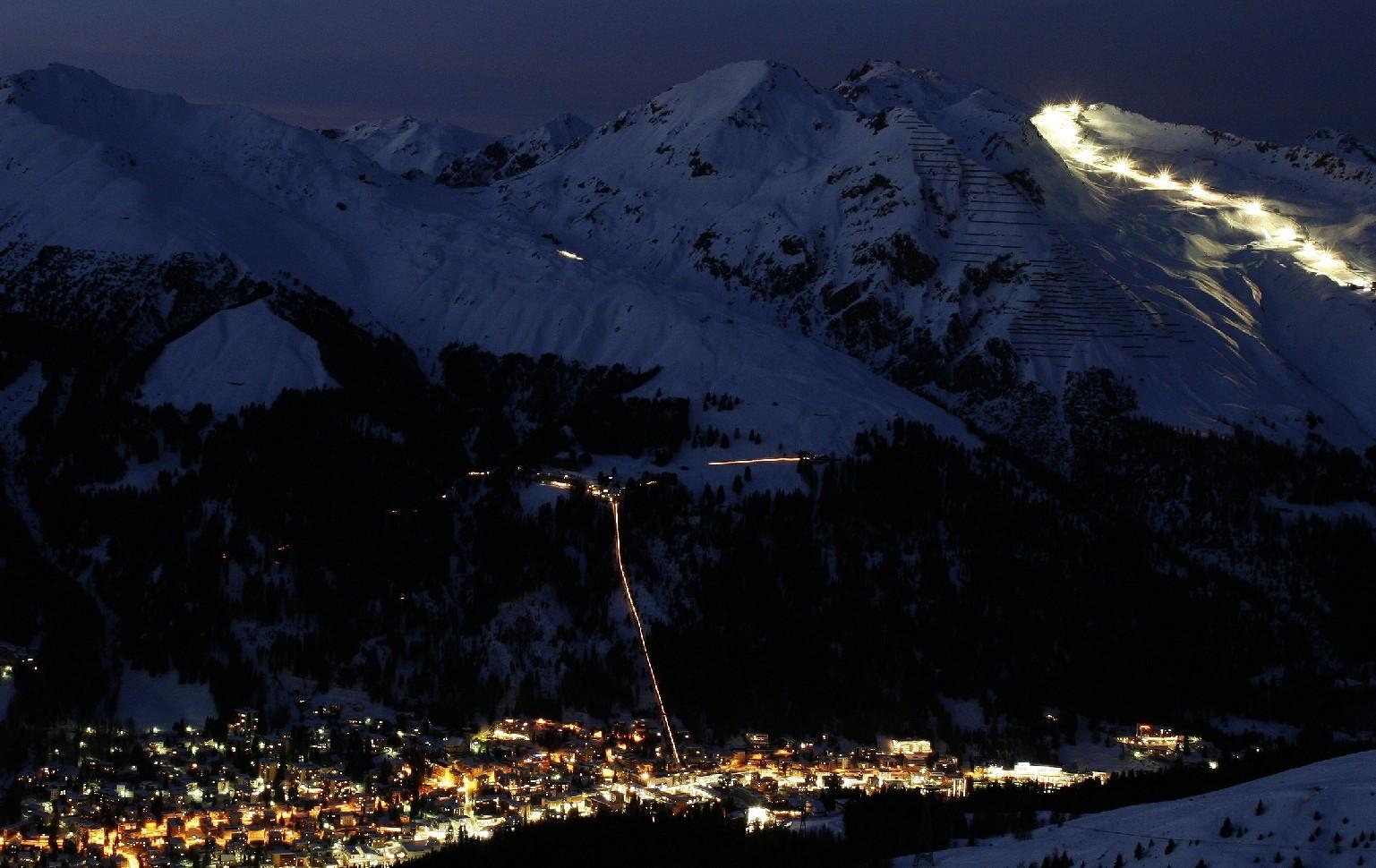
Remote night view in winter (2008)

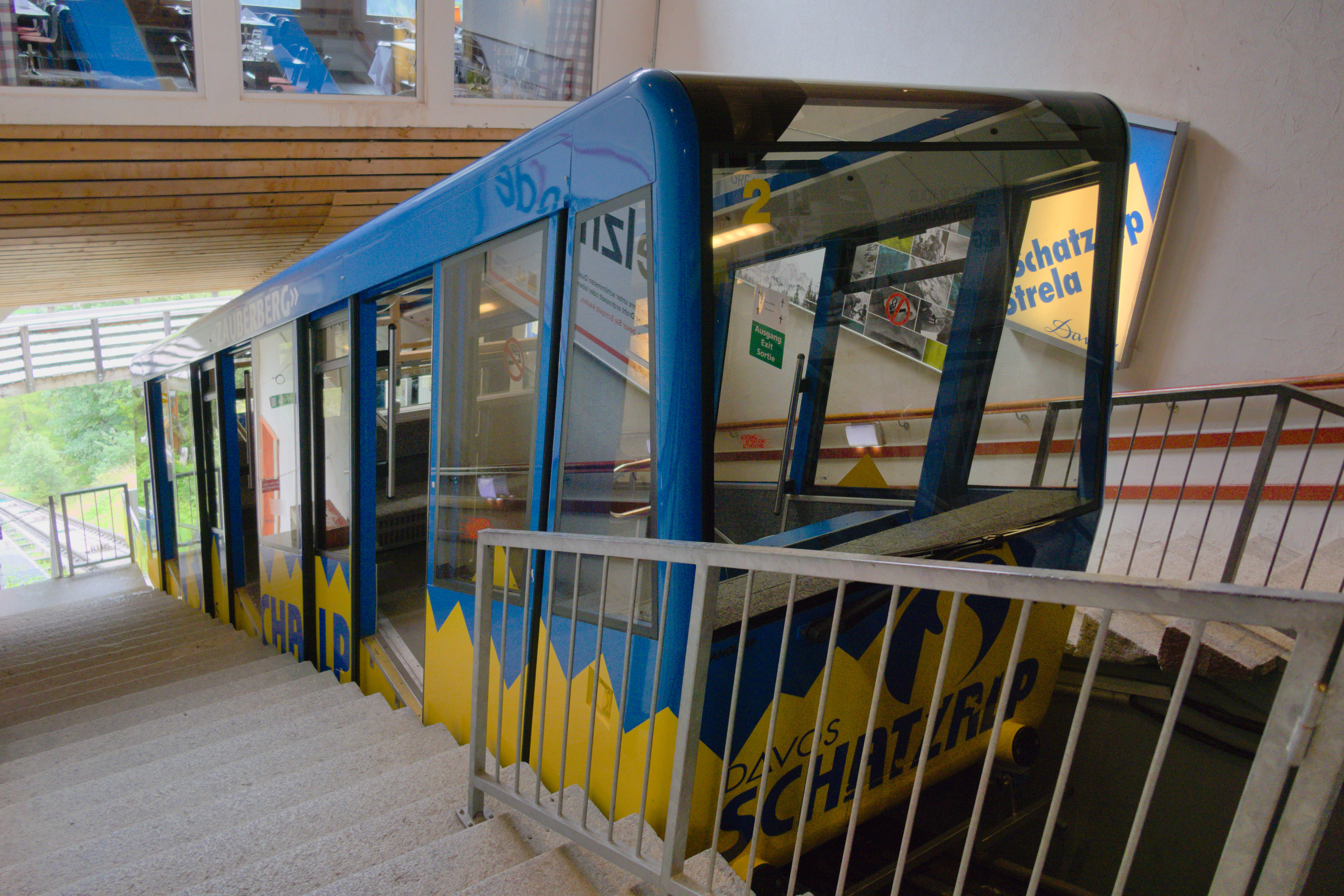
upper station (2020)

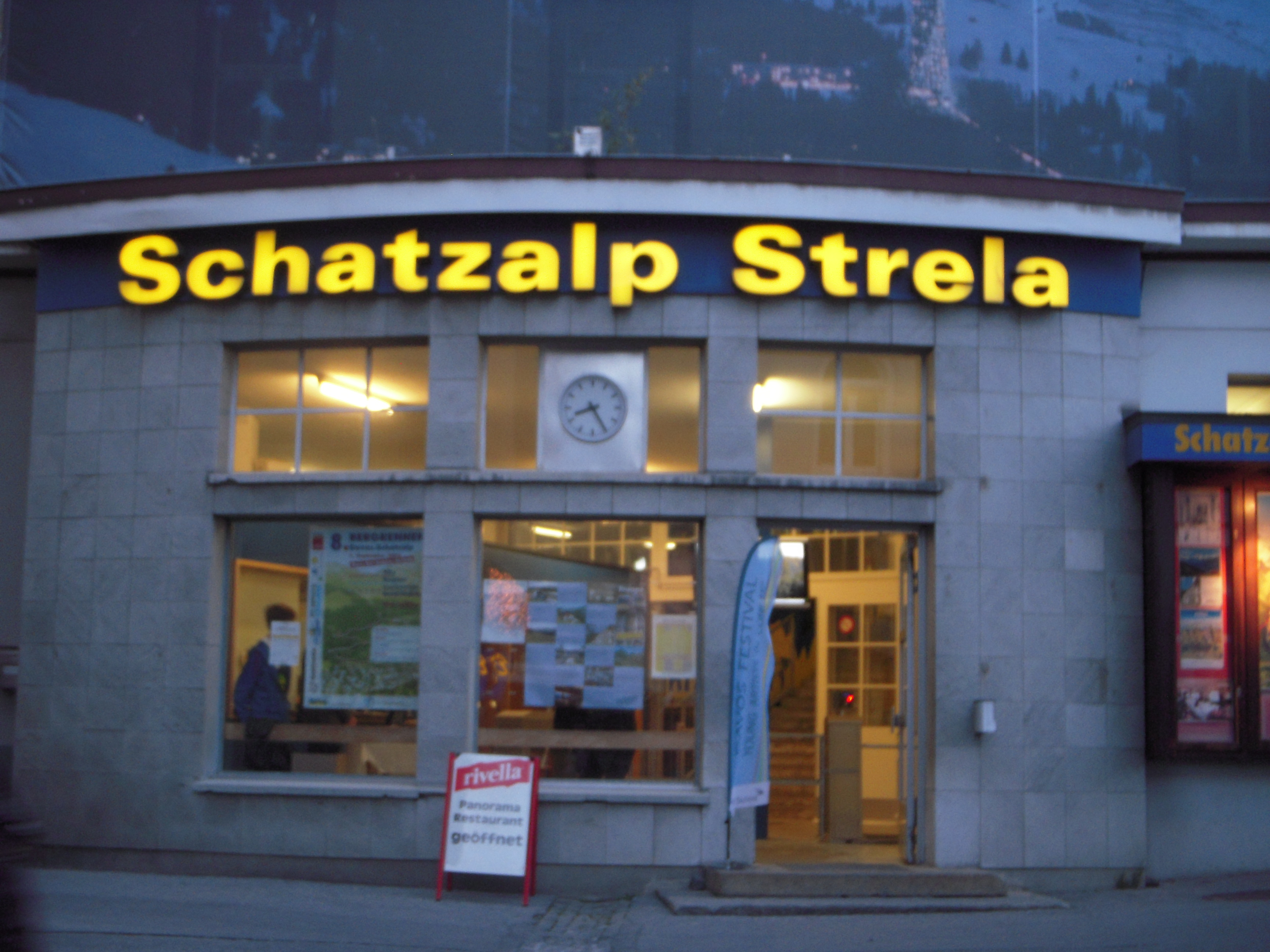
lower station, exterior (2012)

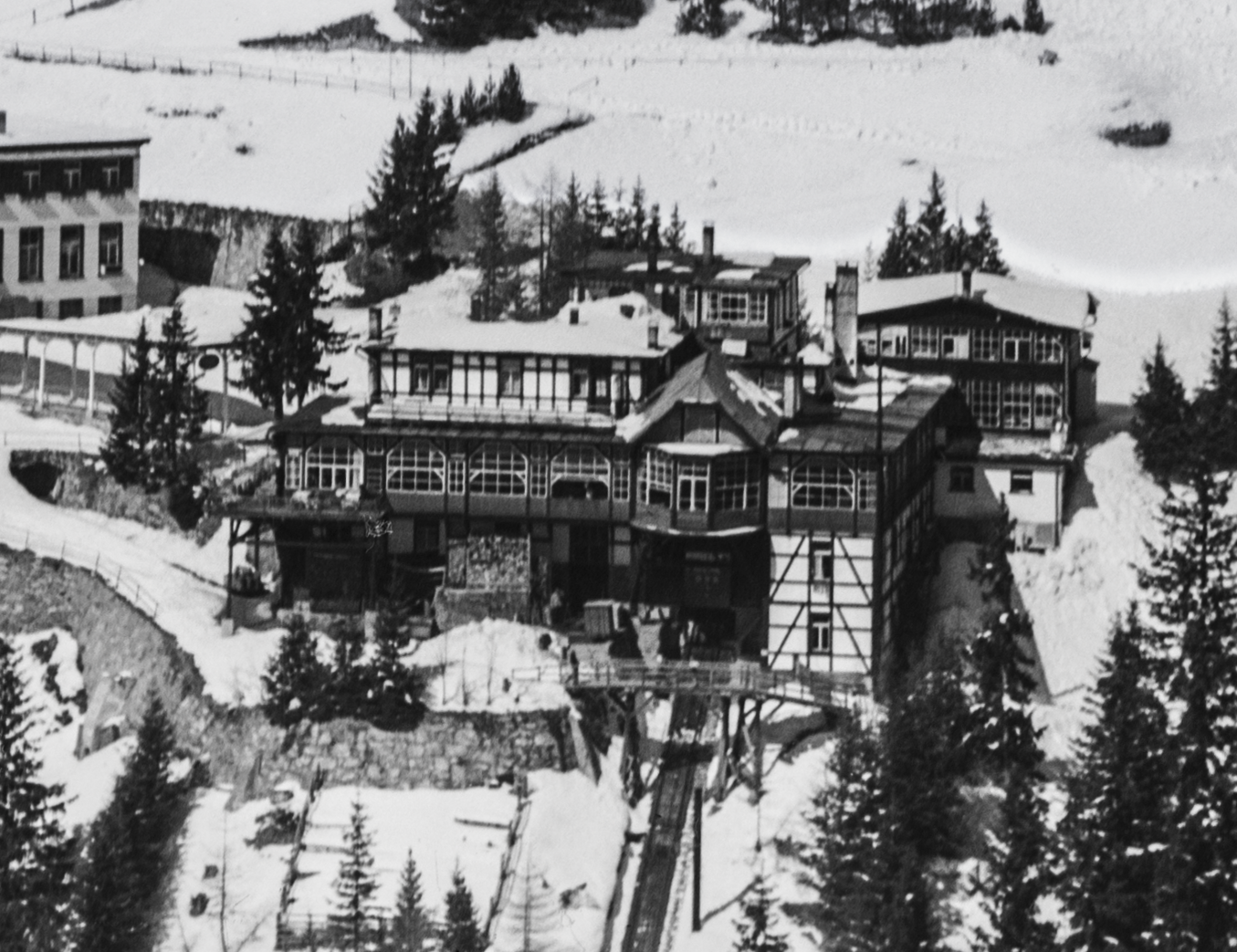
upper station, aerial view (1949)
