= Davos Glaris railway station =

Railway station in Switzerland

Davos Glaris
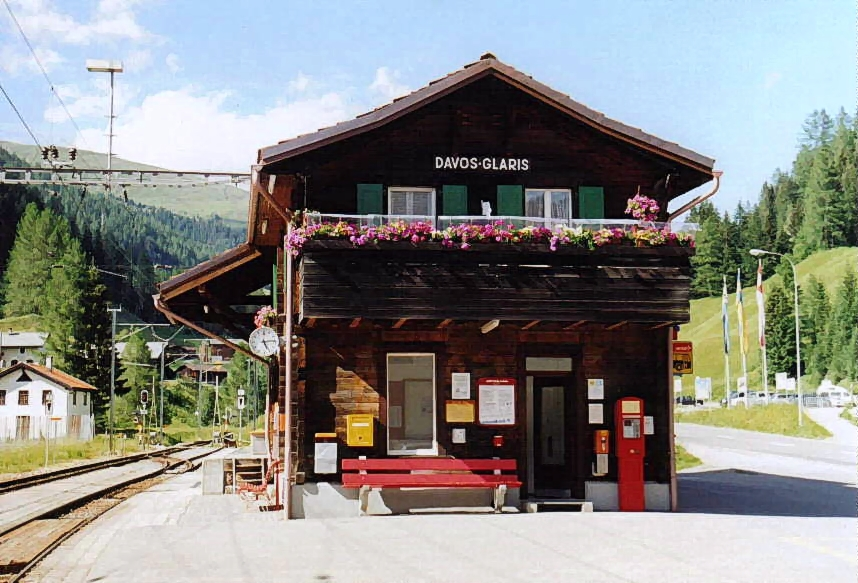
- The station building in 2008

General information
- Location: Landwasserstrasse 58; 7277 Davos; Davos; Switzerland
- Coordinates: 46°44′44″N 9°46′48″E
- Elevation: 1,454 m (4,770 ft)
- Owner: Rhaetian Railway
- Line: Davos Platz–Filisur line
- Distance: 56.3 km (35.0 mi) from Landquart
- Train operators: Rhaetian Railway
- Connections: PostAuto Schweiz buses

History
- Opened: 1 July 1909
- Electrified: 22 December 1919

Passengers
- 2018: 100 per weekday

Services
Preceding station	Rhaetian Railway	Following station
Davos Monstein towards Filisur	R 11	Davos Frauenkirch towards Davos Platz
Location

Davos Glaris railway station is a railway station in the municipality of Davos, in the Swiss canton of Graubünden. It is located on the Davos Platz–Filisur line. An hourly service operates on this line.

== Services ==
As of the December 2023 timetable change, the following services stop at Davos Glaris:

- Regio: hourly service between Filisur and Davos Platz.
