= Schmittentobel Viaduct =

Limestone railway viaduct in Switzerland

Schmittentobel Viaduct Schmittentobel-Viadukt
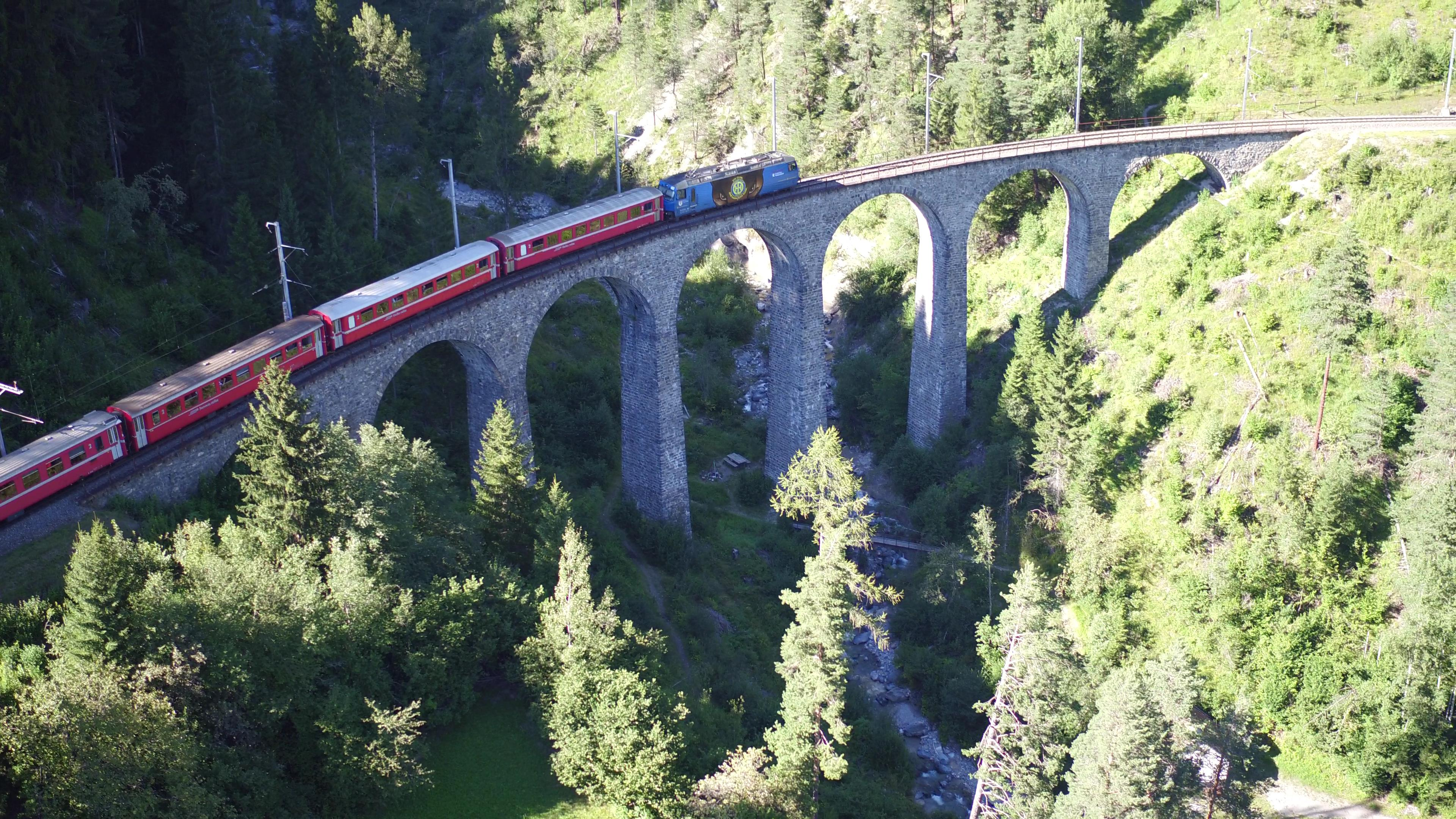
- Glacier Express on the Schmittentobel Viaduct.
- Coordinates: 46°40′51″N 09°40′28″E
- Carries: Rhaetian Railway
- Locale: Schmitten, Switzerland
- Official name: Schmittentobel-Viadukt
- Owner: Rhaetian Railway
- Maintained by: Rhaetian Railway

Characteristics
- Design: Arch bridge, Viaduct
- Material: Stone
- Total length: 137 m (449 ft)
- Height: 35 m (115 ft)
- No. of spans: 7, each 15 m (49 ft)

History
- Opened: October 1902

Location
- Interactive map of Schmittentobel Viaduct

The Schmittentobel Viaduct (German: Schmittentobel-Viadukt) is a single track limestone railway viaduct. It is situated near Schmitten, in the Canton of Graubünden, Switzerland.

The viaduct was opened in 1903 by the Rhaetian Railway, which still owns and uses it today.

An important element of the World Heritage-listed Albula Railway, the viaduct is 35 metres (115 ft) high, 137 metres (449 ft) long, and has seven spans, each 15 metres (49 ft) in length.

== Location ==
Aerial video of Schmittentobel Viaduct.

The Schmittentobel Viaduct forms part of the Albula Railway section between Tiefencastel and Filisur.

Within sight of the Schmittentobel Viaduct, a little further along the line towards Filisur, is the much better known Landwasser Viaduct, which is one of the signature structures of the Albula Railway, and indeed the whole Rhaetian Railway.

== Technical data ==
The Schmittentobel Viaduct is 35 metres (115 ft) high, 137 metres (449 ft) long, and has no main span. Each of its seven equal spans is 15 metres (49 ft) in length.

== See also ==
- Glacier Express
- Bernina Express
- Filisur (Rhaetian Railway station)
