= Wiesen Viaduct =

Wiesen Viaduct Wiesener Viadukt
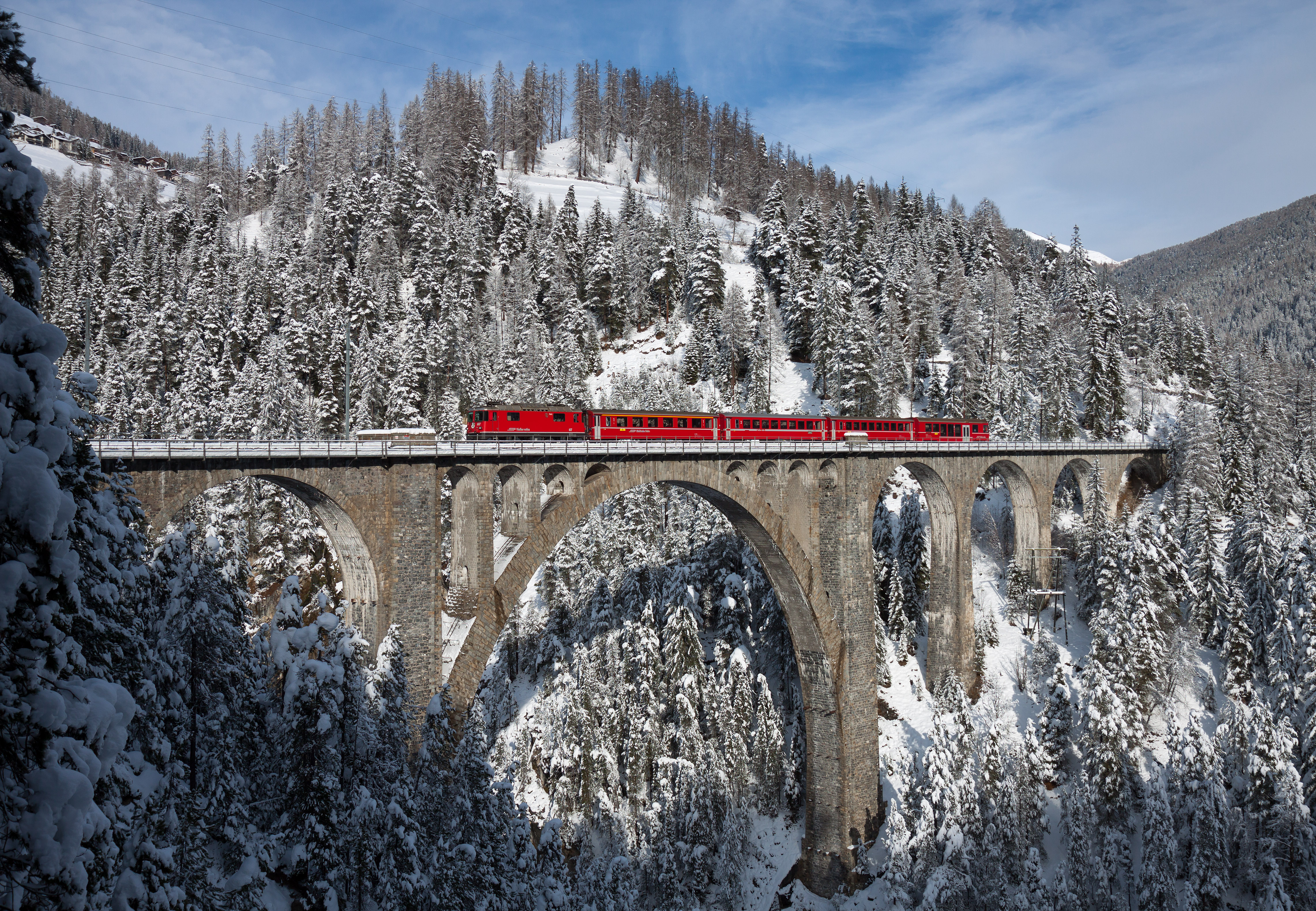
- A RhB Ge 4/4 II with a push–pull train crossing the viaduct
- Coordinates: 46°41′40″N 09°42′46″E
- Carries: Rhaetian Railway (RhB)
- Crosses: Landwasser
- Locale: Wiesen, canton of Grisons, Switzerland
- Official name: Wiesener Viadukt
- Owner: Rhaetian Railway (RhB)
- Maintained by: Rhaetian Railway (RhB)

Characteristics
- Design: Arch bridge, Viaduct
- Material: Concrete blocks with dimension stone coverage
- Total length: 210 m (690 ft)
- Width: 3.7 m (12 ft)
- Height: 88.9 m (292 ft)
- Longest span: 55 m (180 ft)
- No. of spans: 7
- Piers in water: 0

History
- Architect: G. Marasi (Westermann & Cie, Zürich), P. Salaz and Heinz Studer (RhB)
- Designer: Friedrich Hennings
- Constructed by: Westermann & Cie, Zürich
- Construction start: October 1906
- Construction cost: CHF 324,000 (1909)
- Opened: 1 July 1909
- Inaugurated: 1 July 1909

Statistics
- Daily traffic: 29 passenger trains

Location
- Interactive map of Wiesen Viaduct

The Wiesen Viaduct (or Wiesener Viaduct; German: Wiesener Viadukt) is a single-track railway viaduct, made from concrete blocks with dimension stone coverage. It spans the Landwasser southwest of the hamlet of Wiesen, in the canton of Grisons, Switzerland.

Designed by the then chief engineer of the Rhaetian Railway, Henning Friedrich, it was built between 1906 and 1909 by the contractor G. Marasi (Westermann & Cie, Zürich) under the supervision of P. Salaz and Hans Studer (RhB). The Rhaetian Railway still owns and uses it today for regular service. An important element of the Davos–Filisur railway, the viaduct is 88.9 metres (292 ft) high and 210 metres (690 ft) long; it has a main span of 55 metres (180 ft).

== Location ==
The Wiesen Viaduct forms part of the Davos–Filisur railway section between Wiesen and Filisur. Just 300 metres (980 ft) southwest of Wiesen railway station, it has, on its south side, a separate pedestrian bridge giving hikers access to Filisur. At the western end of the viaduct is a non functioning Hippsche turning wheel.

== History ==
The Wiesen Viaduct structure was designed by the then Chief Engineer of the Rhaetian Railway, Henning Friedrich. Construction began in October 1906, under the direction of another engineer, Hans Studer. With the launch of the Davos–Filisur railway in July 1909, the viaduct came into operation. It cost a total of 324,000 Swiss francs to build.

The falsework used for the building of the viaduct was designed by G. Marasi, swallowed up around 500 cubic metres (18,000 cu ft) of wood, and was constructed by the Graubünden carpenter Richard Coray.

In 1926, the viaduct was the inspiration for Ernst Ludwig Kirchner's painting Brücke bei Wiesen.

== Technical data ==
The Wiesen Viaduct is 88.9 metres (292 ft) high and 210 metres (690 ft) long. Its main span is only 3.7 metres (12 ft) wide, but also 55 metres (180 ft) long, which makes it one of the longest main spans of any masonry bridge.

To the west of the main span are two arches, each 20 metres (66 ft) long. East of the main span are four more arches, each of them also 20 metres (66 ft) long.

These technical characteristics combine to make the Wiesen Viaduct the Rhaetian Railway's largest stone and second largest bridge.

== Gallery ==
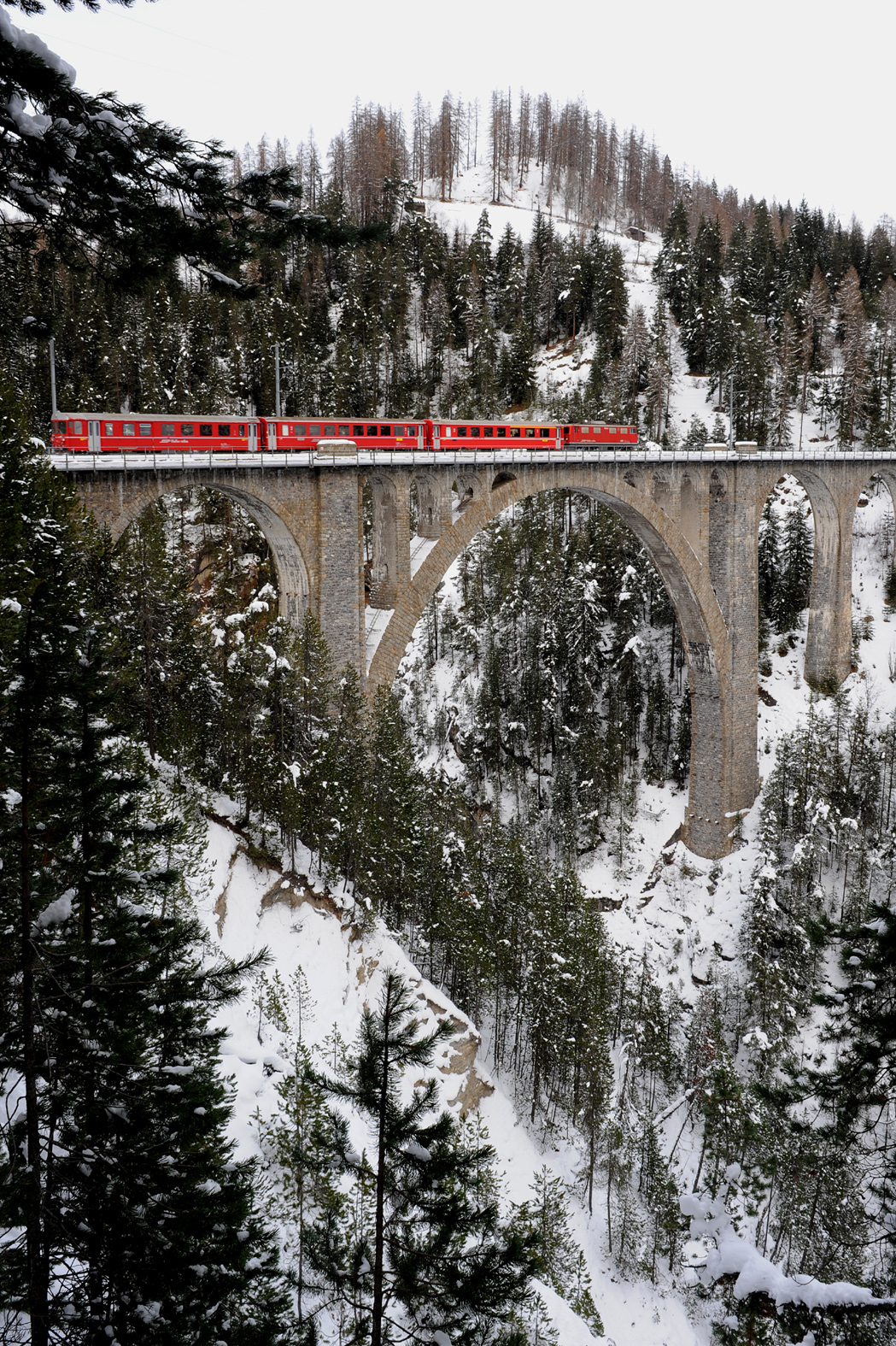
Push–pull train, with Ge 4/4 I no 608 and driving coach BDt no 1721, crossing the Wiesen Viaduct.

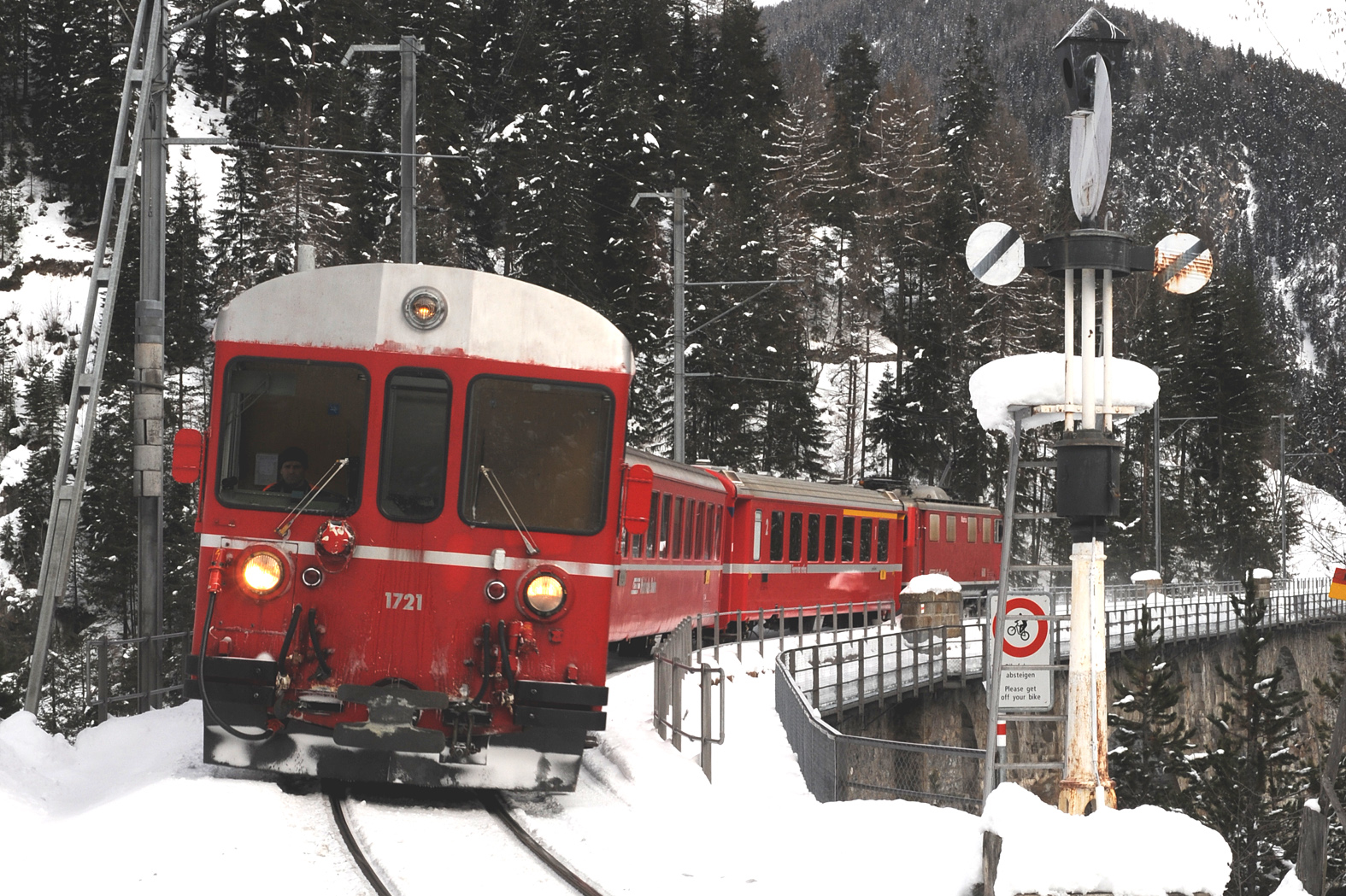
A push–pull train from Filisur crossing the viaduct. The non functioning Hippsche turning wheel is visible at the right.

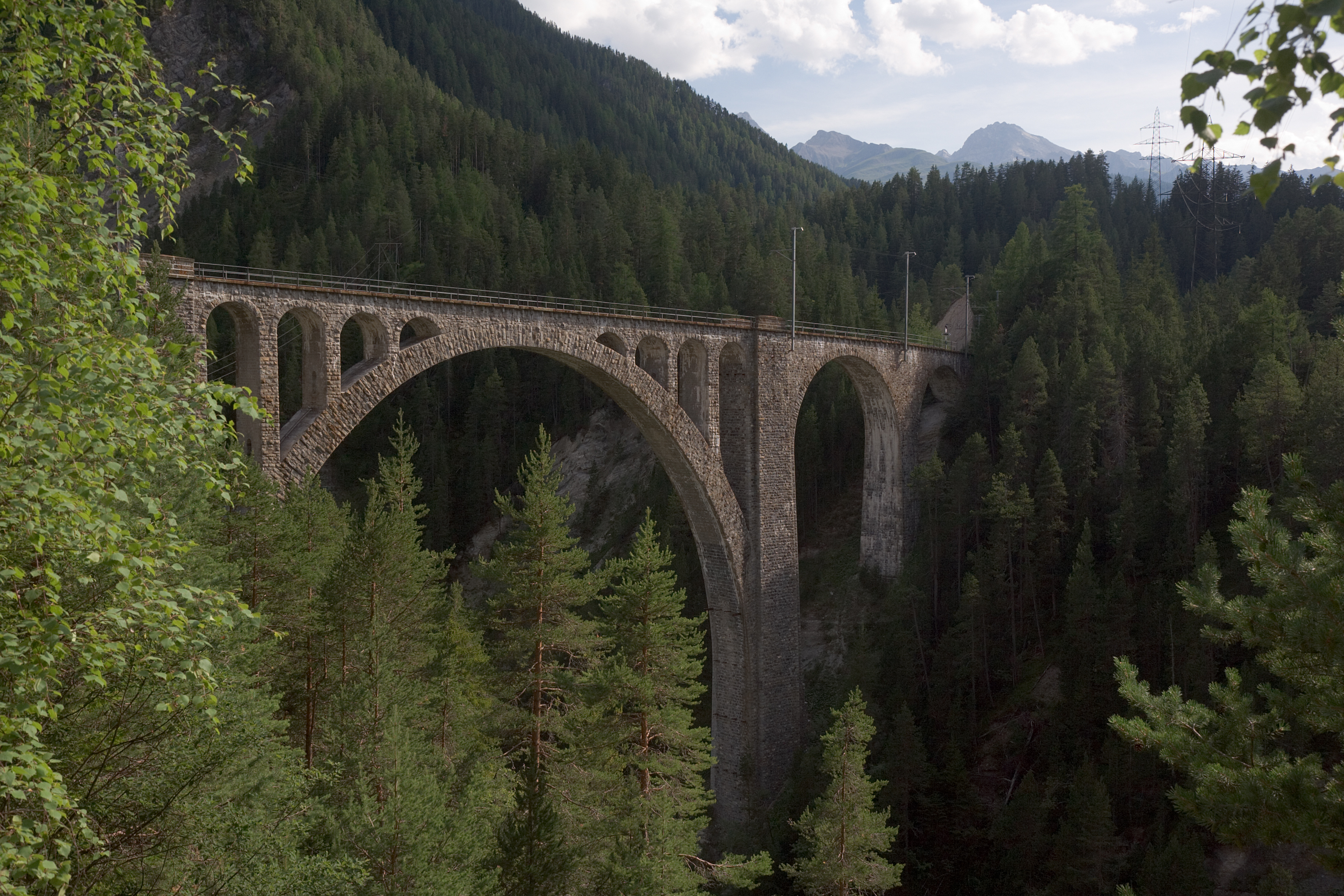
View of the viaduct in summer.

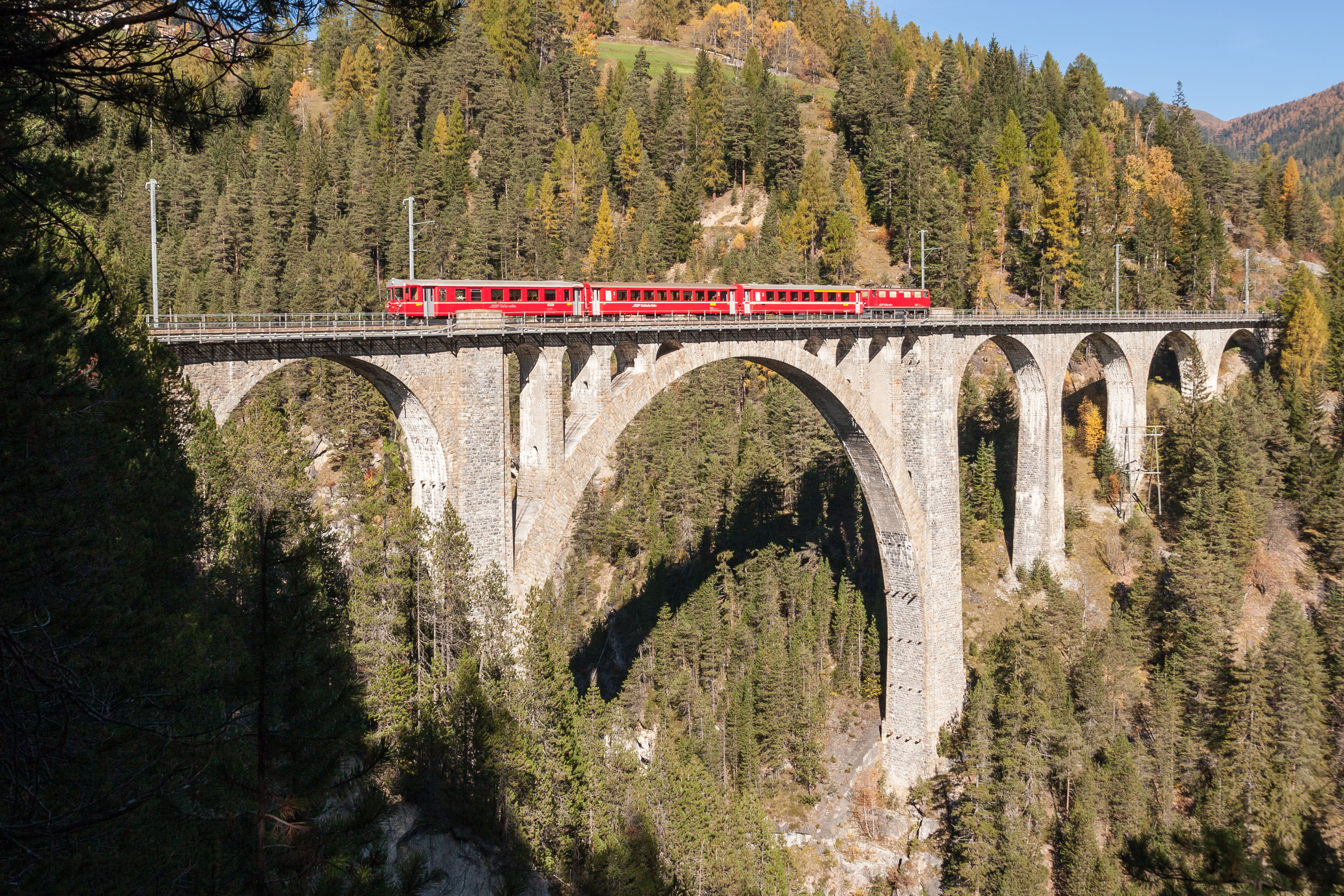
Wiesener Viadukt (10-2008)

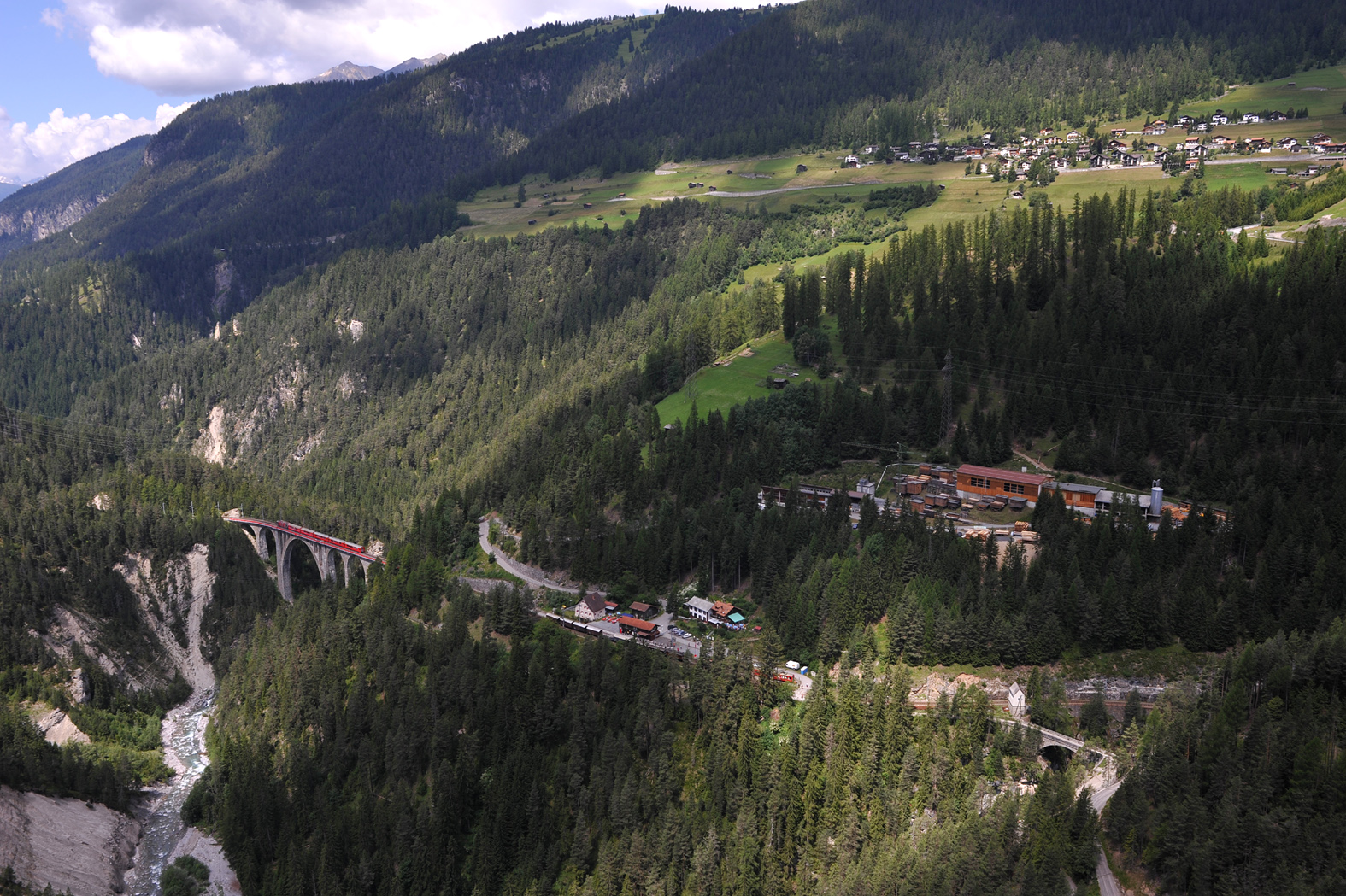
View of the viaduct from the Jenisbergstrasse.

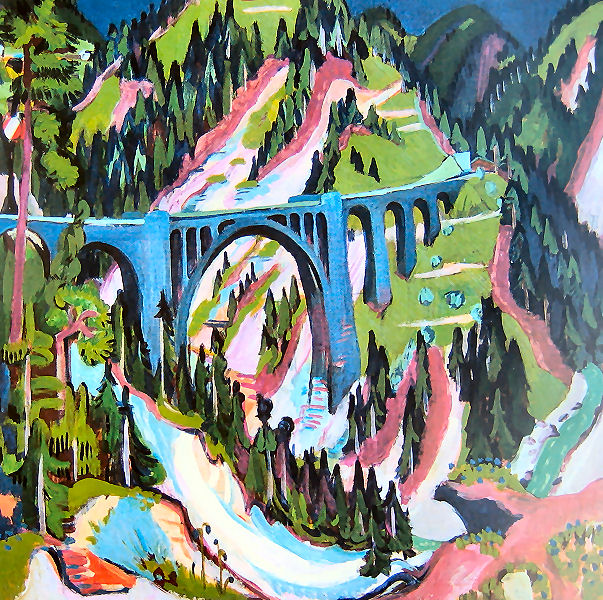
Ernst Ludwig Kirchner: Brücke bei Wiesen.

== See also ==
- Bernina Express
- Arch bridge
