= Davos Frauenkirch railway station =

Railway station in Switzerland

Davos Frauenkirch
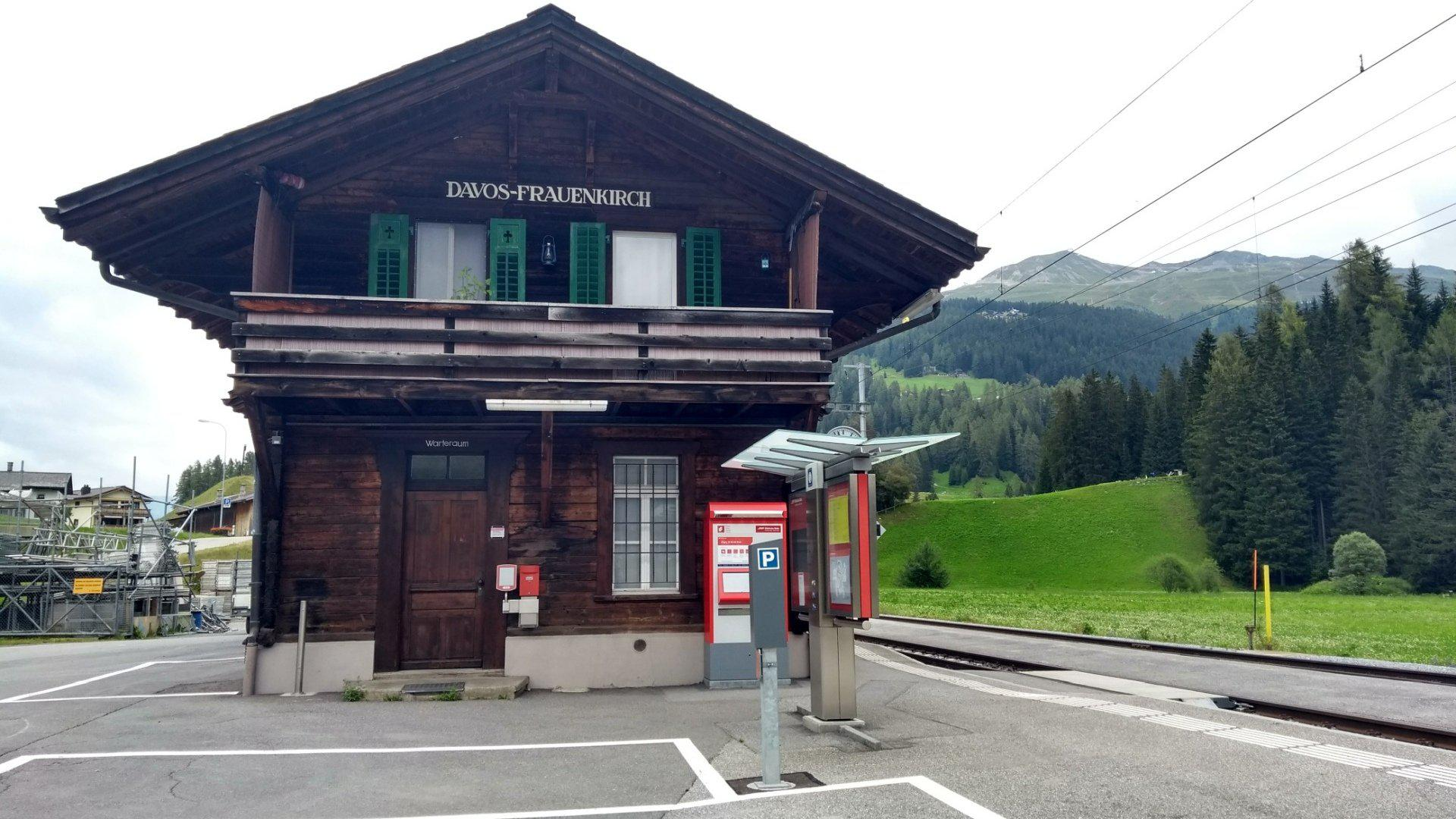
- The station building in 2018

General information
- Location: Landwasserstrasse 25; 7276 Davos; Davos; Switzerland
- Coordinates: 46°46′00″N 9°47′57″E
- Elevation: 1,504 m (4,934 ft)
- Owner: Rhaetian Railway
- Line: Davos Platz–Filisur line
- Distance: 53.3 km (33.1 mi) from Landquart
- Train operators: Rhaetian Railway

History
- Opened: 1 July 1909
- Electrified: 22 December 1919

Passengers
- 2018: 50 per weekday

Services
Preceding station	Rhaetian Railway	Following station
Davos Glaris towards Filisur	R 11	Davos Platz Terminus
Location

Davos Frauenkirch railway station is a railway station in the municipality of Davos, in the Swiss canton of Graubünden. It is located on the Davos Platz–Filisur line. An hourly service operates on this line.

== Services ==
As of the December 2023 timetable change, the following services stop at Davos Frauenkirch:

- Regio: hourly service between Filisur and Davos Platz.
