= Hipp reversible disk signal =

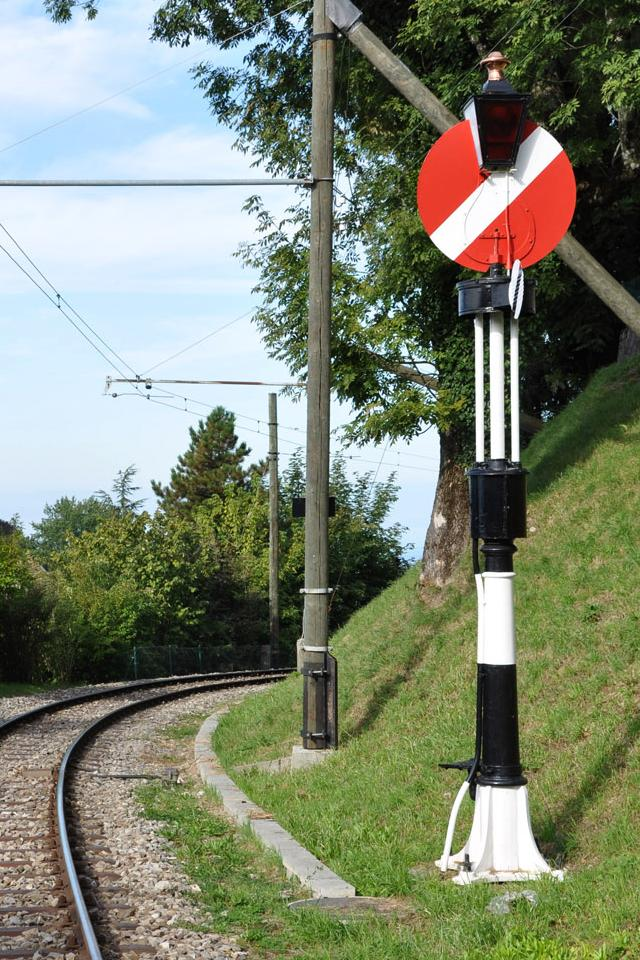
Hippsche reversible disk in use at the Blonay – Chamby museum train

The hippsche Wendescheibe or Hipp’sche Wendescheibe , is a historical railway signal. The automatic and visual signal served as distant signals and home signals. Its main advantage was that energy to move the signal was provided locally, while the low power impulse to move the signal was transmitted electrically from the signal box, thus minimizing cumbersome and unreliable energy transmission over distance.

== Description ==
=== History ===
This type of signal was developed by the inventor and watchmaker Matthäus Hipp and first used in Winterthur in 1862. The signal is named after him and was in use long before the wing signals.

=== How it works ===
The Hipp reversible disc signal is mounted on a hollow cast column. This carries a sheet metal disc about 1m in diameter. Until 1877 the disc was painted red on both sides with a white border, but later on one face red with a white diagonal bar and on the reverse white and black, partly chequered, partly with a diagonal bar, or simply painted grey. The change in paint required a mechanical modification: to switch from one signal layer to the other, a quarter turn was initially required. After the conversion, the disc rotated once by 90°, the next time by 270°. Thereafter, the signal has had a unique front and back. Two small white disks are mounted below the large disk and perpendicular to it. They are white on both sides with a black diagonal line or with black quarter segments. The disc can be rotated and shows the approaching train one of two aspects: the red board, which signals “stop”, or the two white discs, which signal "proceed". The small wing discs are primarily used to balance wind forces, thus reducing the actuating force required. The small wings also have the advantage of showing a positive travel signal. Up to 1877, a hole in the middle of the large disc served to mitigate wind forces further. Because the reversible discs were often reused, such perforated discs often found a "second life" as distant signals. The signals were generally arranged to the right of the track in the direction of travel. Apparatus installed after 1930 (all in second or third use) are on the left.

The drive works via a weight in the signal mast, which has to be rewound after approx. 200 disc revolutions. The signal is triggered electromagnetically with electricity from a battery (electrical low-voltage pulse) and works more reliably in storms and in winter than reversible windows that are operated with wire pulls. The current pulse always triggers the rotation of the disc in a clockwise direction.

It is also noteworthy that the Hipp reversible windows were equipped with an electrical feedback signal.

The design as a distant signal was basically the same, the disk was green until 1935, then orange instead of red and mostly only had a lantern on it, which showed a double light via a mirror system. The last distant signal of this kind was in Bischofszell Stadt until February 13, 1975.

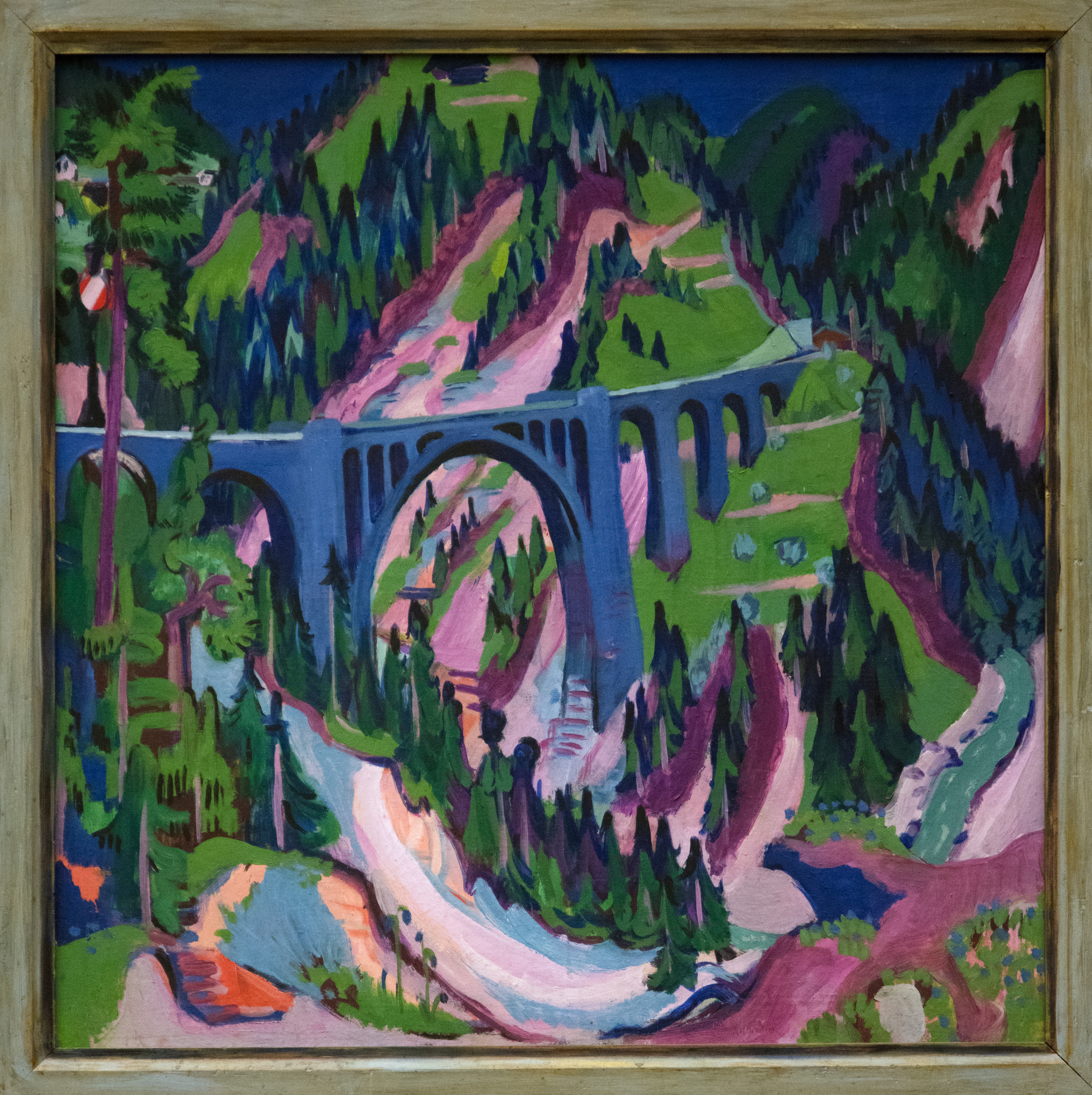
Ernst Ludwig Kirchner: The Bridge near Wiesen (1926). The Hipp reversible disk (top left on the edge of the picture) indicates to the train the narrow side or the small wings.

The last home signals worked on the Rhaetian Railway until May 20, 1987. From 1904 almost the entire network was gradually equipped with such entry signals, which were improved in some points. There were neither exit signals nor pre-signals, the turning windows were used exclusively to protect the station system, as their original name, "final signal" suggests. When the section block was set up, light signals were set up, now in the usual arrangement of entry pre-signal, entry signal combined with exit pre-signal, exit signal. A signal that had been shut down remained on the RhB line Davos - Filisur at the western end of the Wiesener Viaduct.

=== Surviving examples ===
This type of signal has been superseded by Light Signals but a few examples have been preserved. Functional specimens are found on museum railways, e.g. on the Zürcher Oberland railway (DVZO), at the Schinznacher Baumschulbahn (SchBB), at the Blonay–Chamby museum railway (BC), at the Furka Steam Railway railway (DFB) and to be found in the LOCORAMA railway adventure world in Romanshorn. Perhaps also because Ernst Ludwig Kirchner immortalized this signal in his picture "The bridge near Wiesen", examples can be found near the Rhaetian network.

Specifically, signals could be found as of 2009 in the following places:

- at the clubhouse of the Oltener Modellbahnfreunde
- the former Kerzers-Kallnach Railway Museum next to the RhB Ge 6/6 I 406 from 1921
- two (both operating in 2021) on the Blonay–Chamby Museum Railway at Blonay station as well as between Blonay and Chantemerle
- at the Bäretswil station on the Bauma side of the DVZO (Zürcher Oberland Steam Railway Association) since 1982 (functional)
- in Romanshorn railway station preservation section LOCORAMA (functional monument)
- on the Schinznacher Baumschulbahn, SchBB (functional)
- at the Furka Steam Railway as an entrance signal to Realp station (functional)
- in Thurgau at Bischofszell Stadt station of the SBB (preserved, not at the original location)
- at the Katzensee steam train (functional)
- at Siemens Integrasquare in Wallisellen

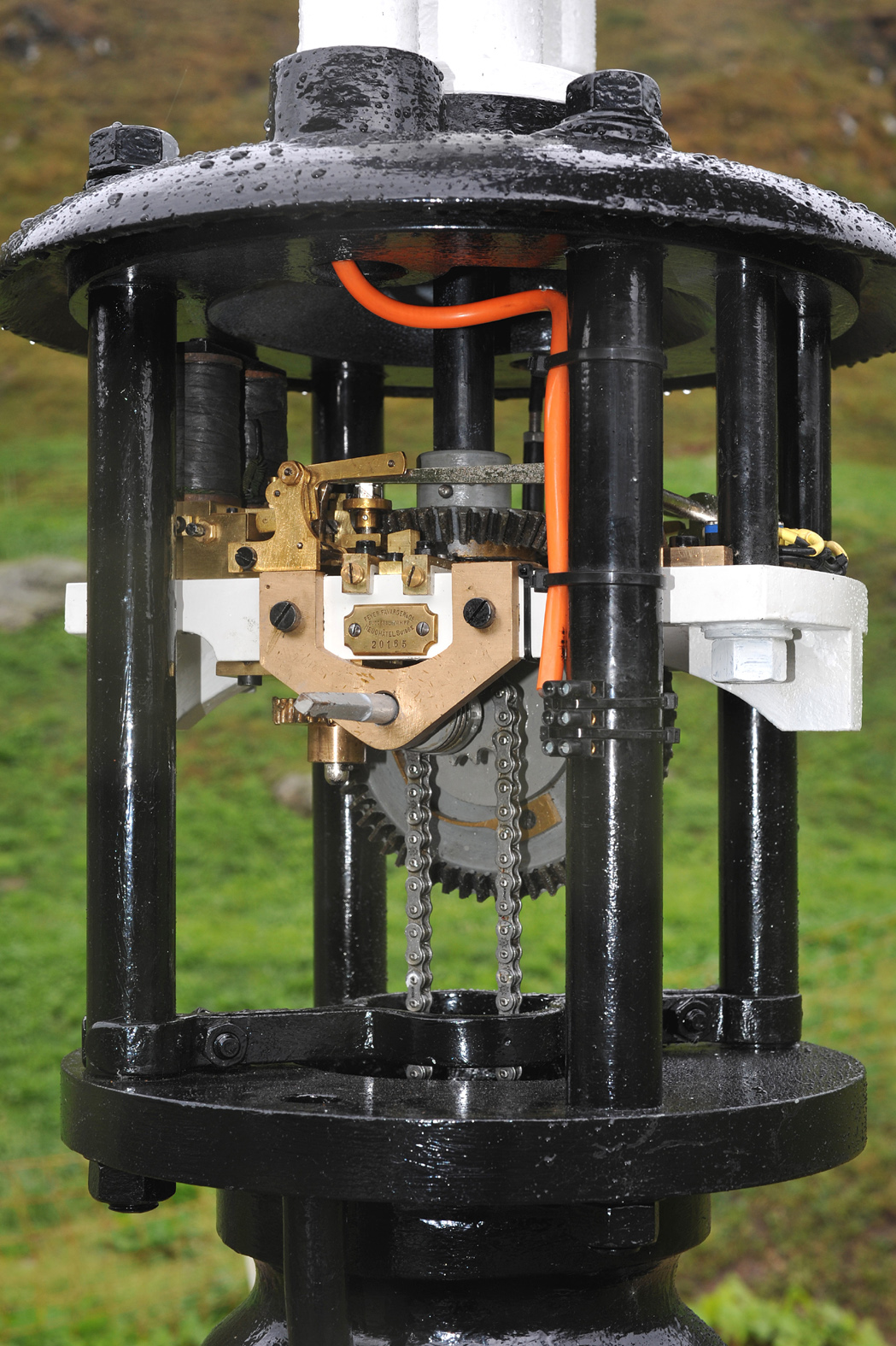

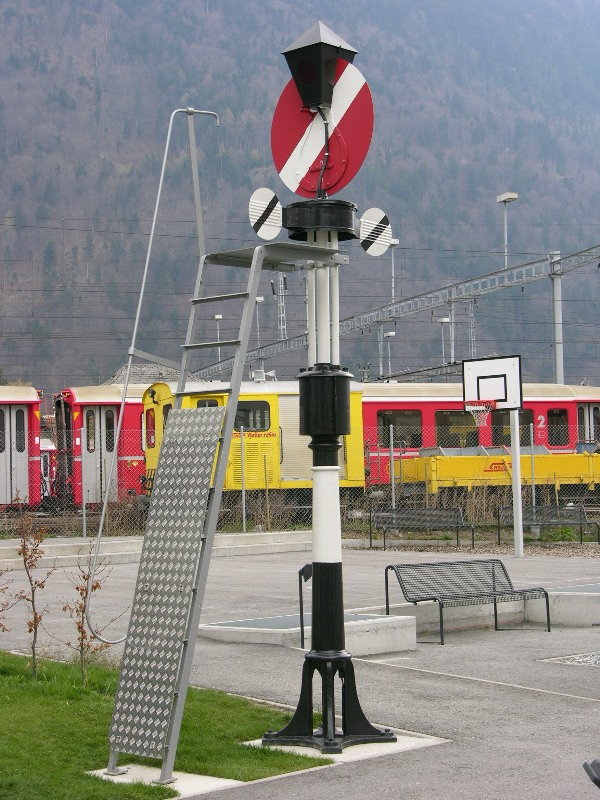

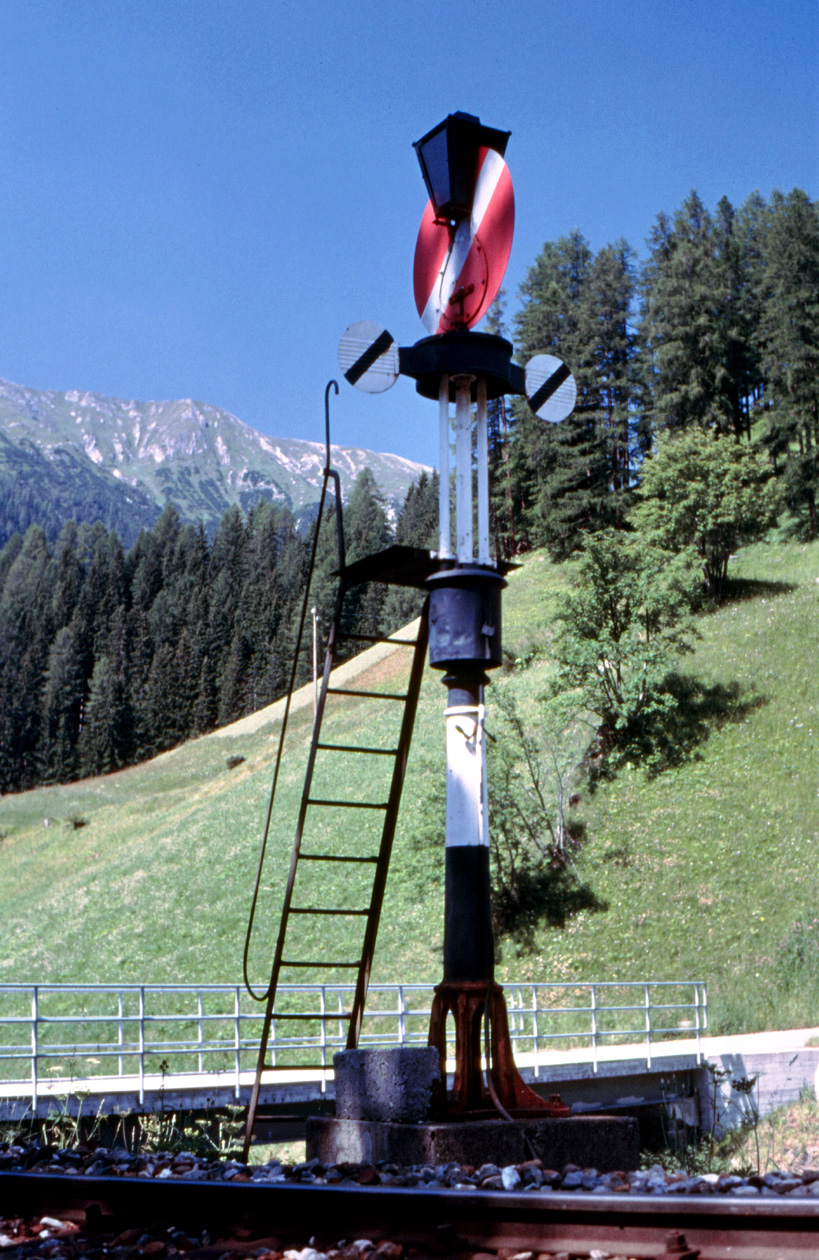

== Sources ==
- Walter Keller: “Die Hippsche Wendescheibe” in “Eisenbahn-Amateur.” No. 1, January 1970, 24th year, pp 5–8.
- Rudolf W. Butz: Hip Hip, Hurra, Die Hippsche Wendescheibe bei Vorbild. In: Eisenbahn-Zeitschrift. September 7/89, pp. 24–29.
- Rudolf W. Butz: Signale der Schweizer Bahnen. Orell Füssli Verlag, Zurich 1972, ISBN 3-280-00080-7.
- Merian, Albert: "Matthias Hipp 1813–1893 und die Hipp’sche Wendescheibe." in "Schwarz Brätt." Integra Nachrichten, Wallisellen, (1978) 1, pp 4–11. (pdf)
