= Davos Wiesen railway station =

Railway station in Switzerland

Davos Wiesen
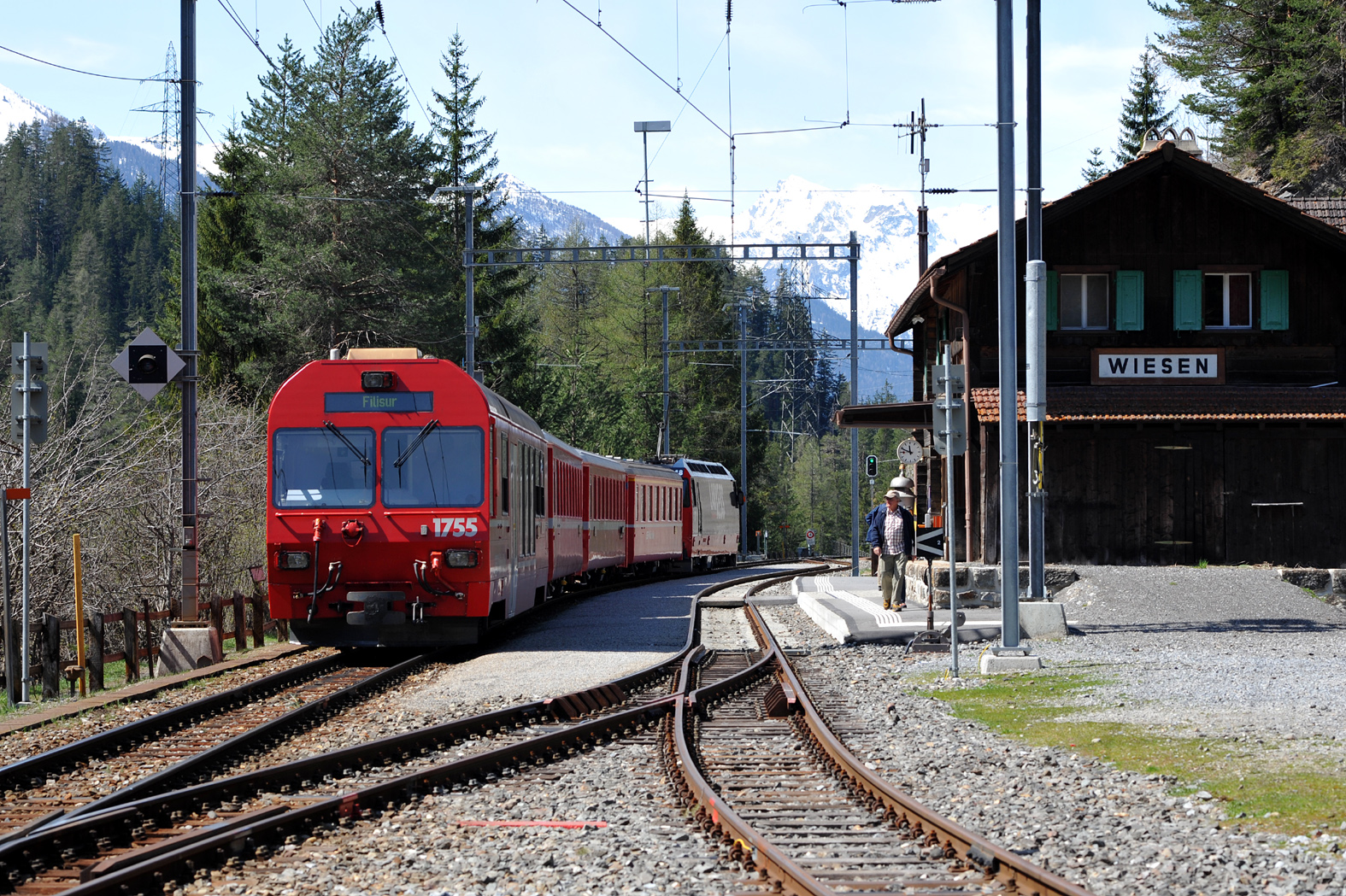
- A Rhaetian Railway train at the station in 2009

General information
- Location: Bahnhof 80; 7494 Davos; Davos; Switzerland
- Coordinates: 46°41′44″N 9°42′57″E
- Elevation: 1,196 m (3,924 ft)
- Owner: Rhaetian Railway
- Line: Davos Platz–Filisur line
- Distance: 64.6 km (40.1 mi) from Landquart
- Platforms: 2
- Train operators: Rhaetian Railway

History
- Opened: 1 July 1909
- Electrified: 22 December 1919
- Former names: Wiesen

Passengers
- 2018: 70 per weekday

Services
Preceding station	Rhaetian Railway	Following station
Filisur Terminus	R 11	Davos Monstein towards Davos Platz
Location

Davos Wiesen railway station, formerly Wiesen, is a railway station in the municipality of Davos, in the Swiss canton of Graubünden. It is located on the Davos Platz–Filisur line. An hourly service operates on this line.

== Services ==
As of the December 2023 timetable change, the following services stop at Davos Wiesen:

- Regio: hourly service between Filisur and Davos Platz.

== In the arts ==
Station appears in the 2015 movie Youth, directed by Paolo Sorrentino.
