= Davos Platz–Filisur railway =

Railway line in Switzerland

Davos Platz–Filisur
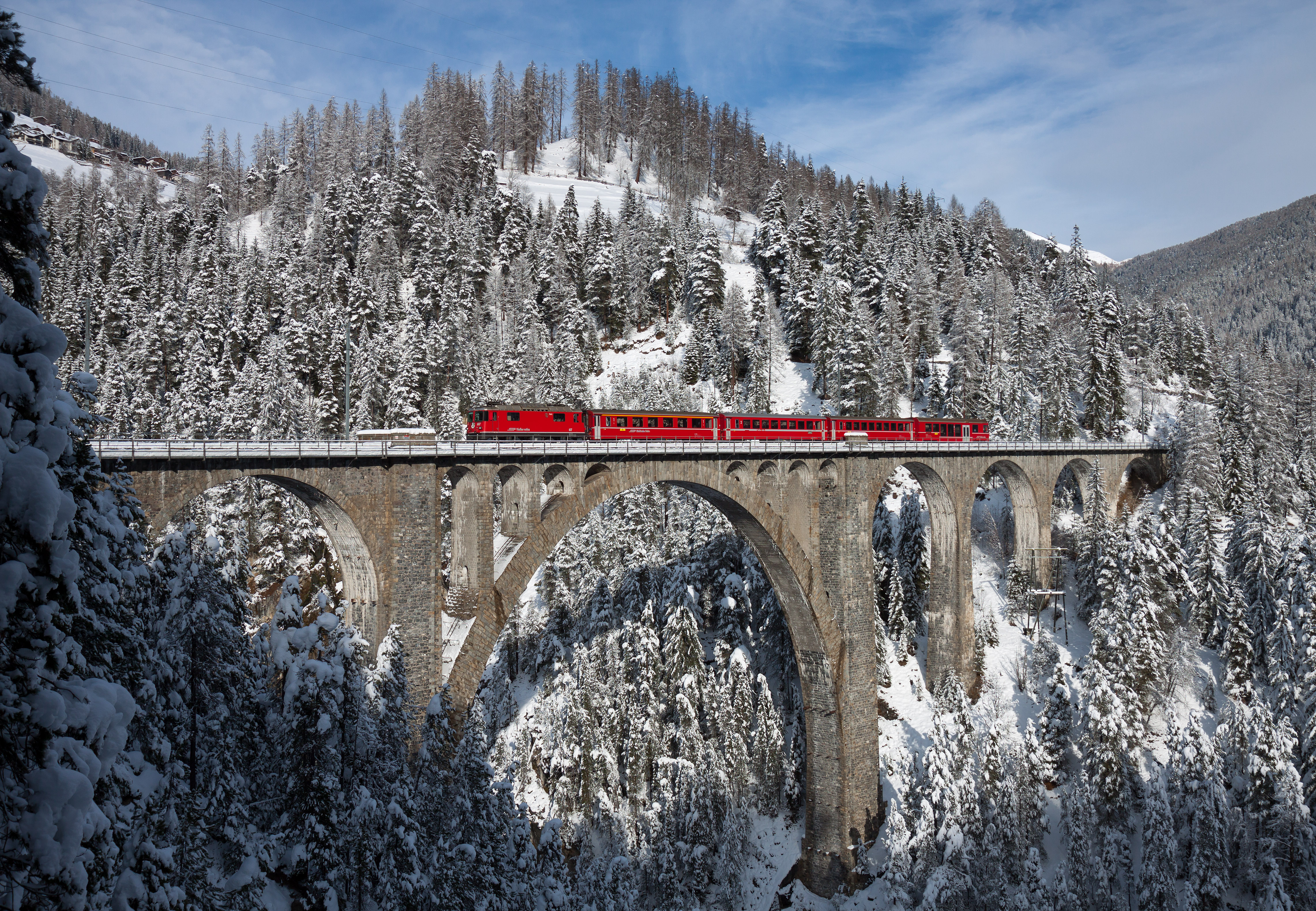
- Push-pull train with Ge 4/4 II on the Wiesen Viaduct

Overview
- Owner: Rhaetian Railway
- Line number: 915
- Termini: Davos Platz; Filisur

Technical
- Line length: 19.303 km (11.994 mi)
- Number of tracks: Single track with Passing loops
- Track gauge: 1,000 mm (3 ft 3 3/8 in) metre gauge
- Electrification: 11 kV 16.7 Hz AC overhead catenary
- Maximum incline: 3.5%

The Davos Platz–Filisur railway is a Swiss metre-gauge railway, which is operated by the Rhaetian Railway (Rhätischen Bahn; RhB) and has connected the spa town of Davos with Filisur on the Albula Railway since 1909. It represents a continuation of the Landquart–Davos Platz railway. The line is consistently single-track, apart from the stations, and has been electrified since 1919.

== Route description ==
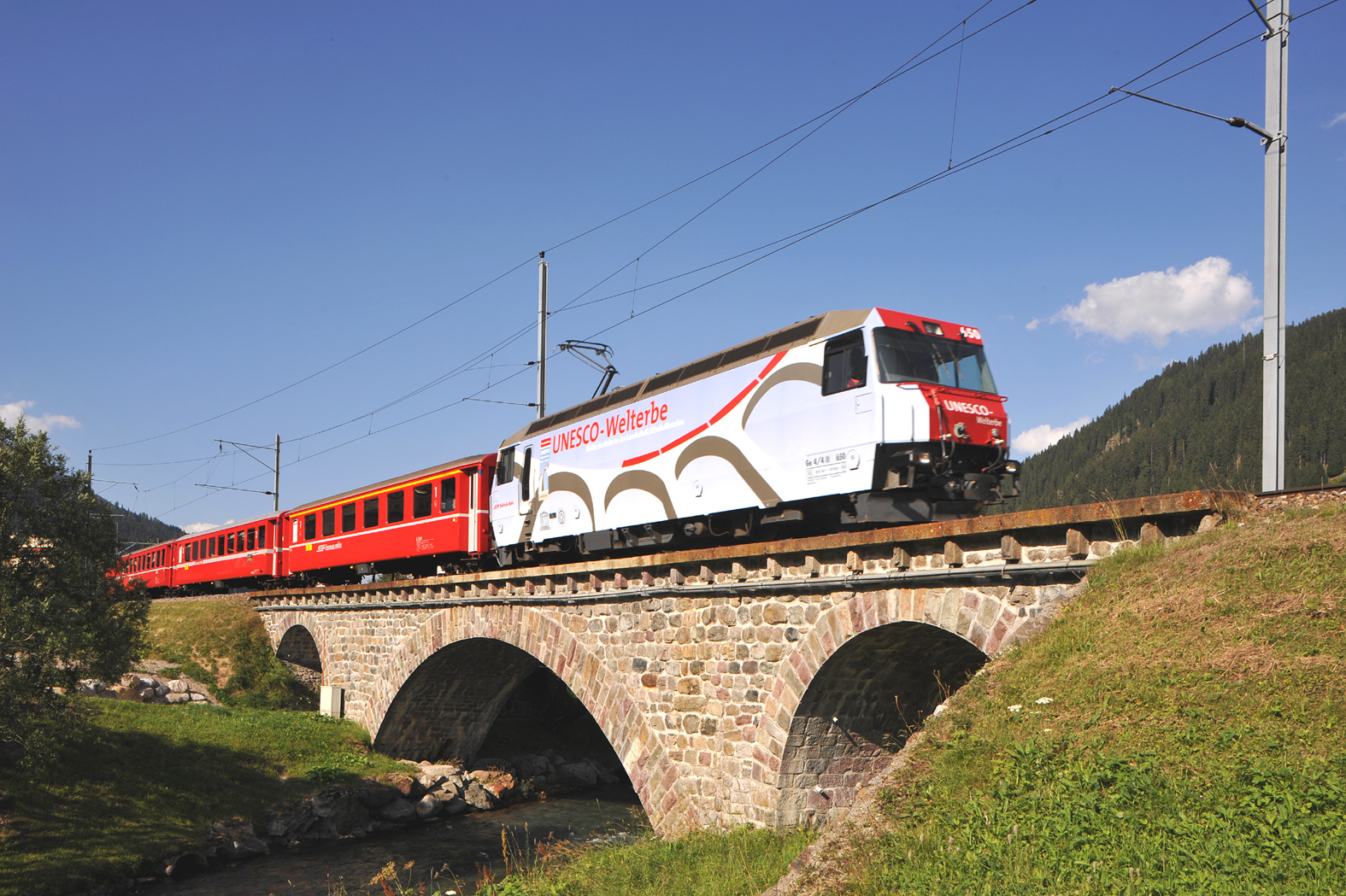
Landwasser-Bruecke just south of Davos Platz

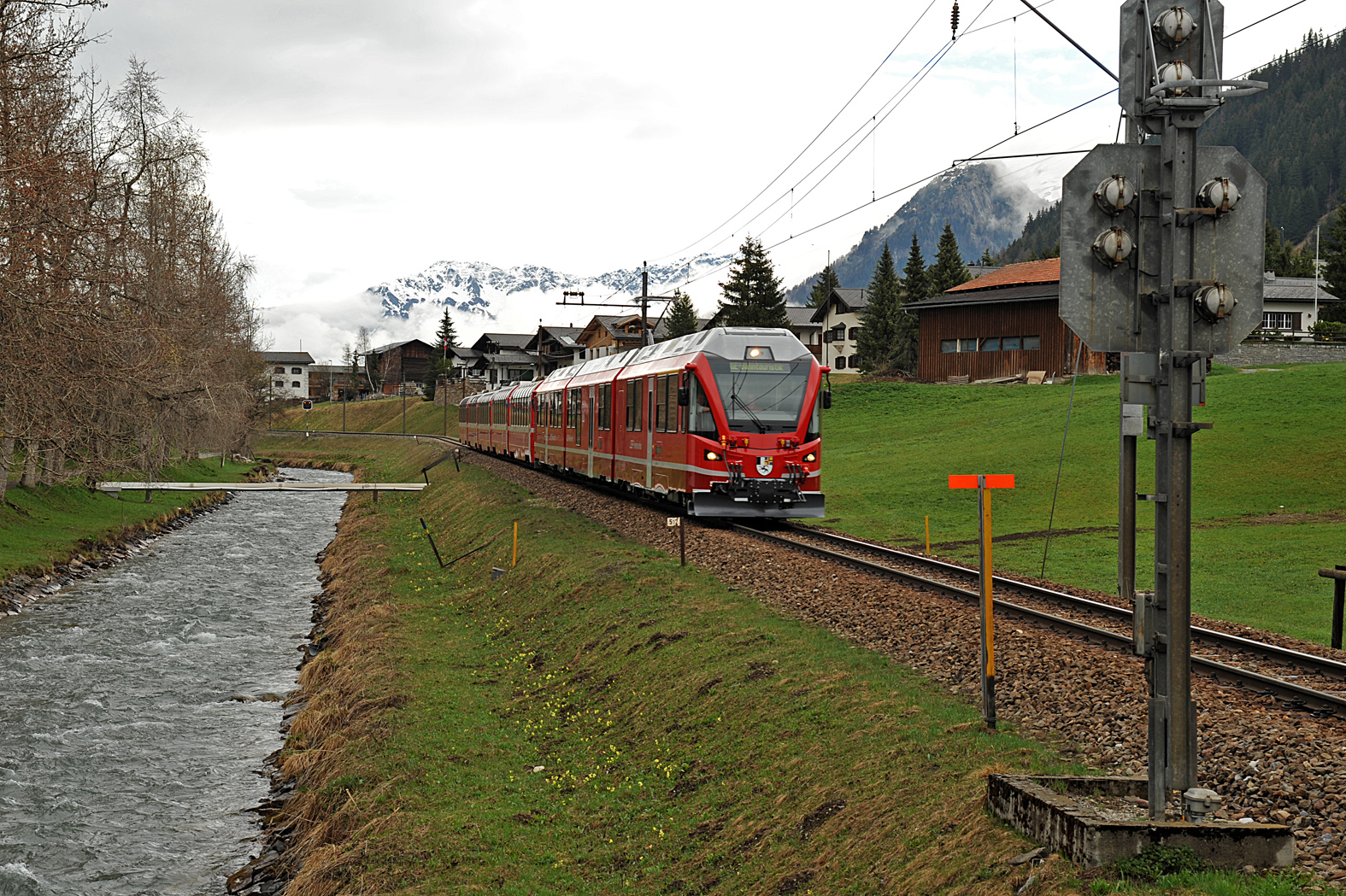
ABe 8-12, Davos Clavadelerstrasse

The line starts at Davos Platz station and runs first through the southern part of the Davos countryside. The line crosses the Landwasser for the first time on a bridge outside Davos Platz. A short time later it passes the siding to the waste disposal facility and a little later the former halt of Islen, before the line runs to the south on a long straight section next to the river. A siding branches off to the gravel works before Frauenkirch station and then the line changes to the western side of the river on another bridge.

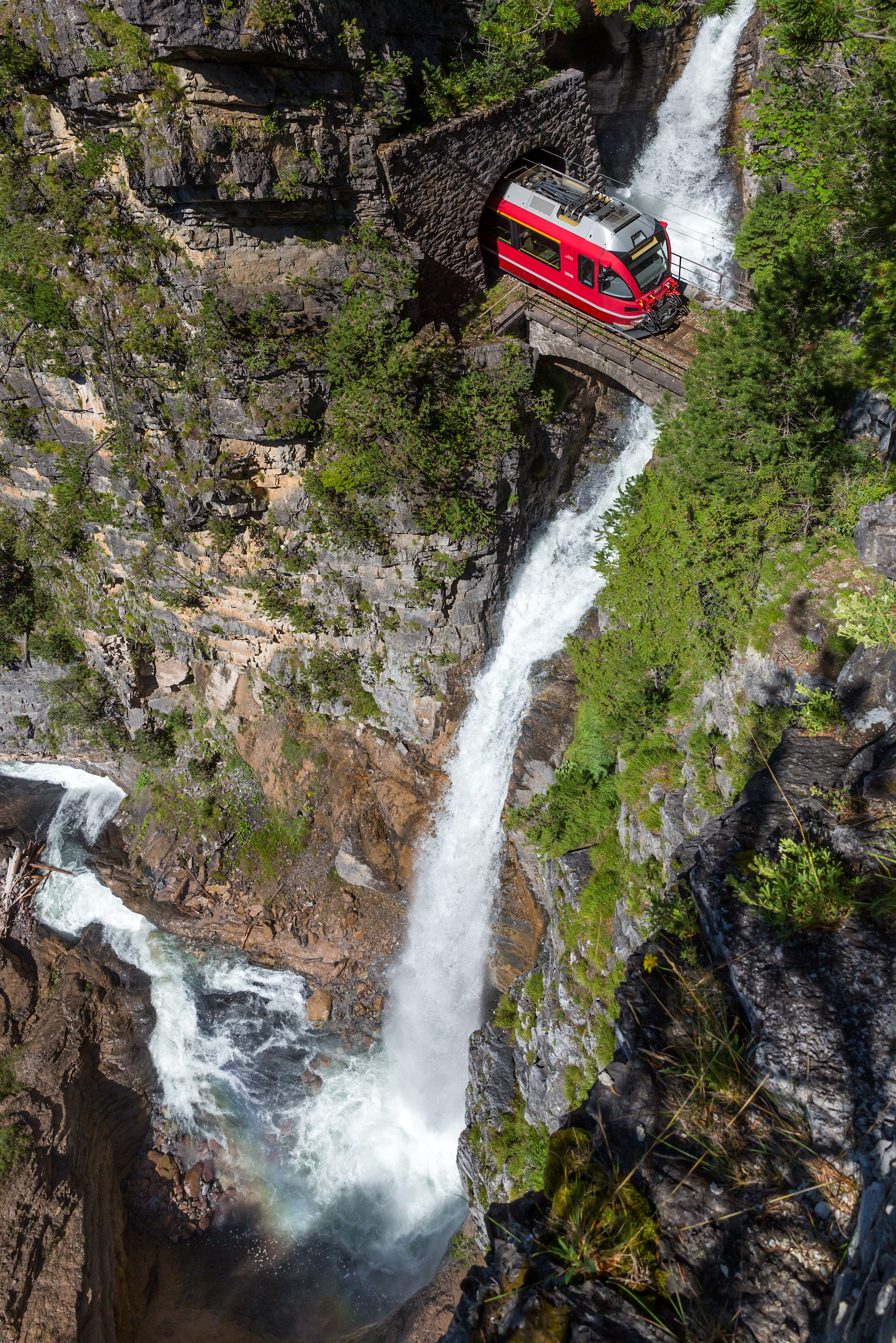
Bärentritt bridge in the Zügenschlucht. An Allegra crosses the Brüggentobelbach

The line crosses the Landwasser again on another bridge near Glaris and crosses Landwasserstrasse shortly later. After Glaris station, the valley becomes increasingly narrow and the line reaches the wild Zügenschlucht (gorge) shortly after Davos Monstein and passed through it using various tunnels and bridges.

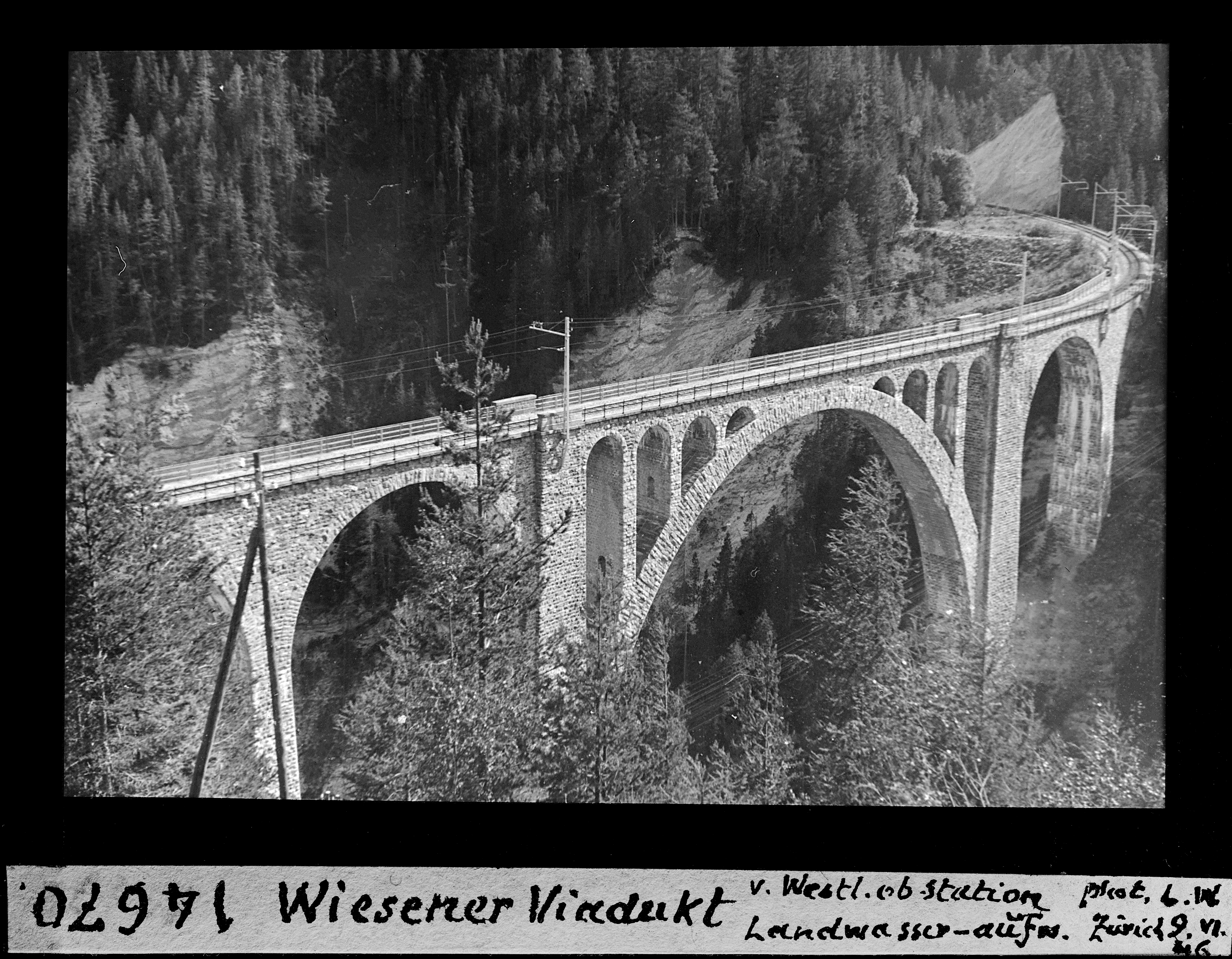
Wiesen Viaduct ETH-BIB (1946)

The Wiesen station is far below the village it is named after. Immediately after the station, the line runs over the 210 m (690 ft) long and 89 m (292 ft) high Wiesen Viaduct, which is Rhaetian Railway's largest stone bridge. The line then traverses the remaining section to the Filisur station, far above the deep Landwasser gorge on a slope.

A total of 14 tunnels with a total length of 4,200 metres (2.6 mi) and 28 bridges are passed between Davos Platz and Filisur, which makes the line technically extremely interesting, not least because of the famous Wiesen Viaduct.

Immediately south of the Wiesen Viaduct there is also a Hipp turning disk (Wendescheibe) at the edge of the track, which, however, is no longer used as a railway signal for rail operations.

A parliamentary initiative launched in 2008 to connect this line with the Arosa Railway is currently not considered a priority by the Grisons government in the light of tight financial resources.

== Station buildings ==
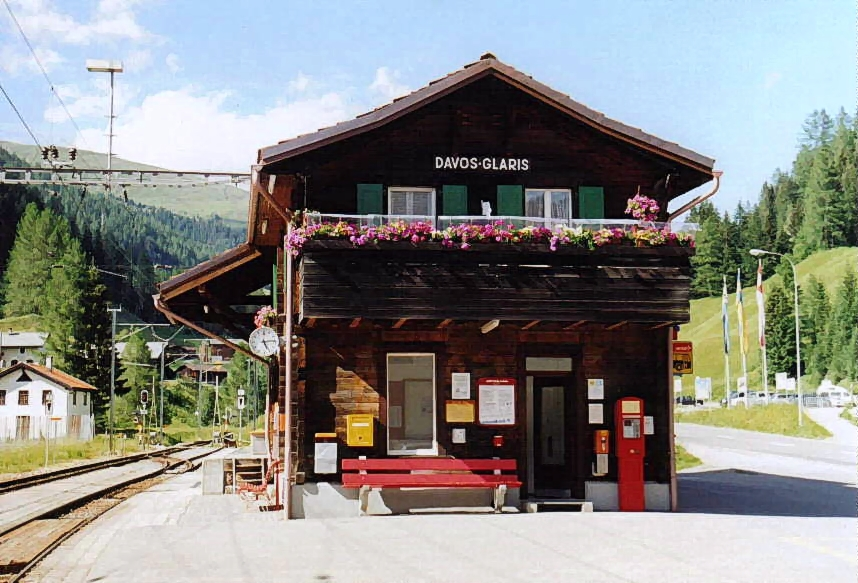
Davos Glaris station

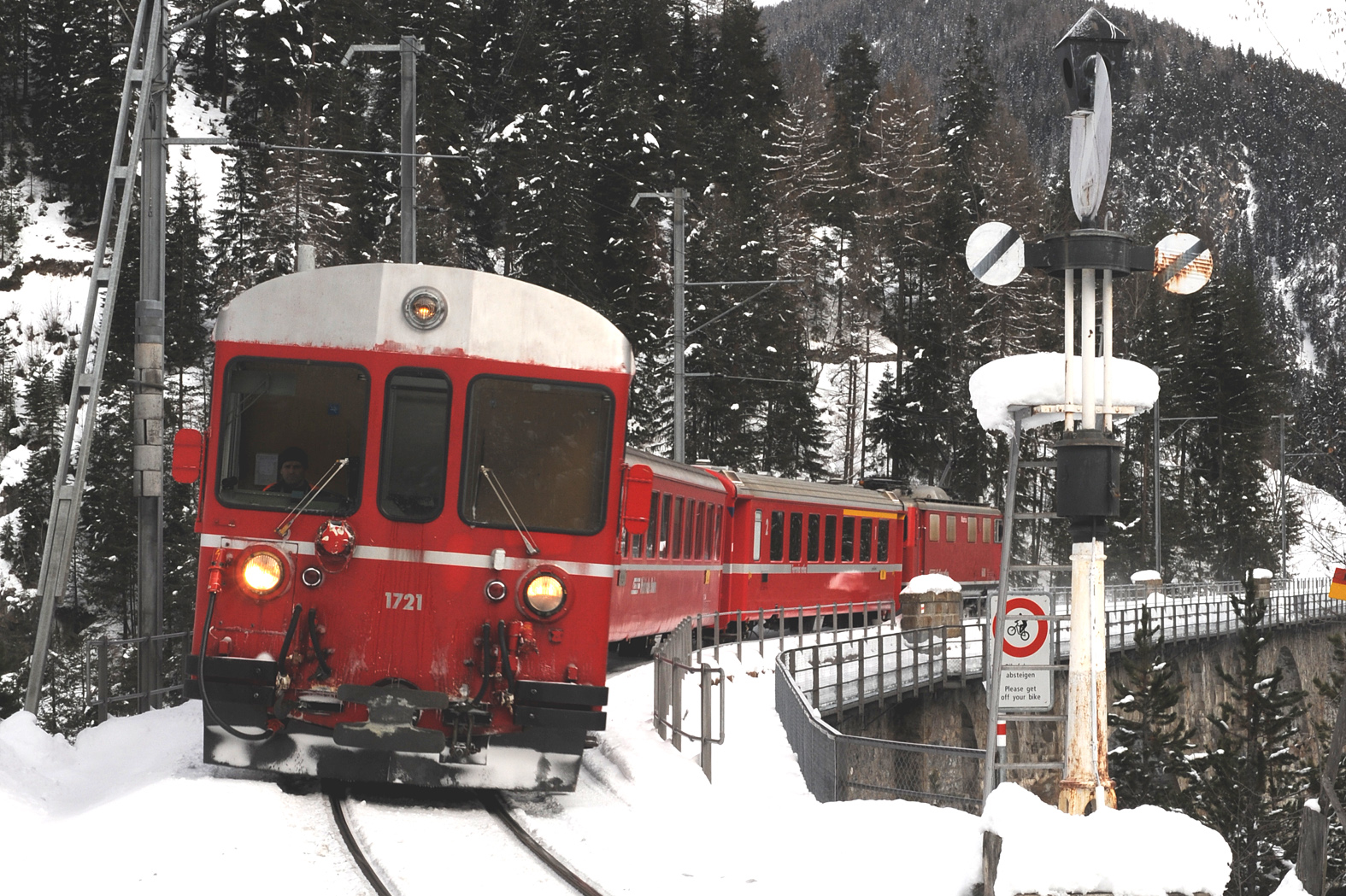
A push-pull train on the way to Filisur passes the Hipp turning disc at the Wiesen Viaduct in 2008

The style of the station building is largely uniform. These are in each case two-storey, dark brown wooden buildings with goods sheds integrated on the north side, where the roof ridge running parallel to the tracks usually protrudes slightly beyond the gable at the ends of the building. Also characteristic is the balcony, often decorated with flower boxes, above the service rooms on the short side of the building under the extended roof. The goods ramp located on the other side is also protected from the weather by a laterally extended roof in the area of the freight shed. The windows upstairs are framed by green shutters.

Somewhat different from this unitary design is the station building of Davos Monstein that has no attached goods shed and is therefore significantly smaller, almost rectangular. In addition, the gable here faces the tracks, so it is rotated by 90 degrees compared to the line's other entrance buildings. Nevertheless, it also has a dark wood colour in combination with the characteristic green shutters.

The station buildings of Frauenkirch, Monstein and Wiesen are located to the west of the tracks, but the Glaris station building is to the east.

All of the intermediate stations are no longer occupied by train staff, but the waiting rooms on the ground floor are still accessible to passengers during the day.

There is a much simpler shelter with a flat roof, which is not used elsewhere, at the halt of Davos Islen, which is no longer served.

== Rail operations ==
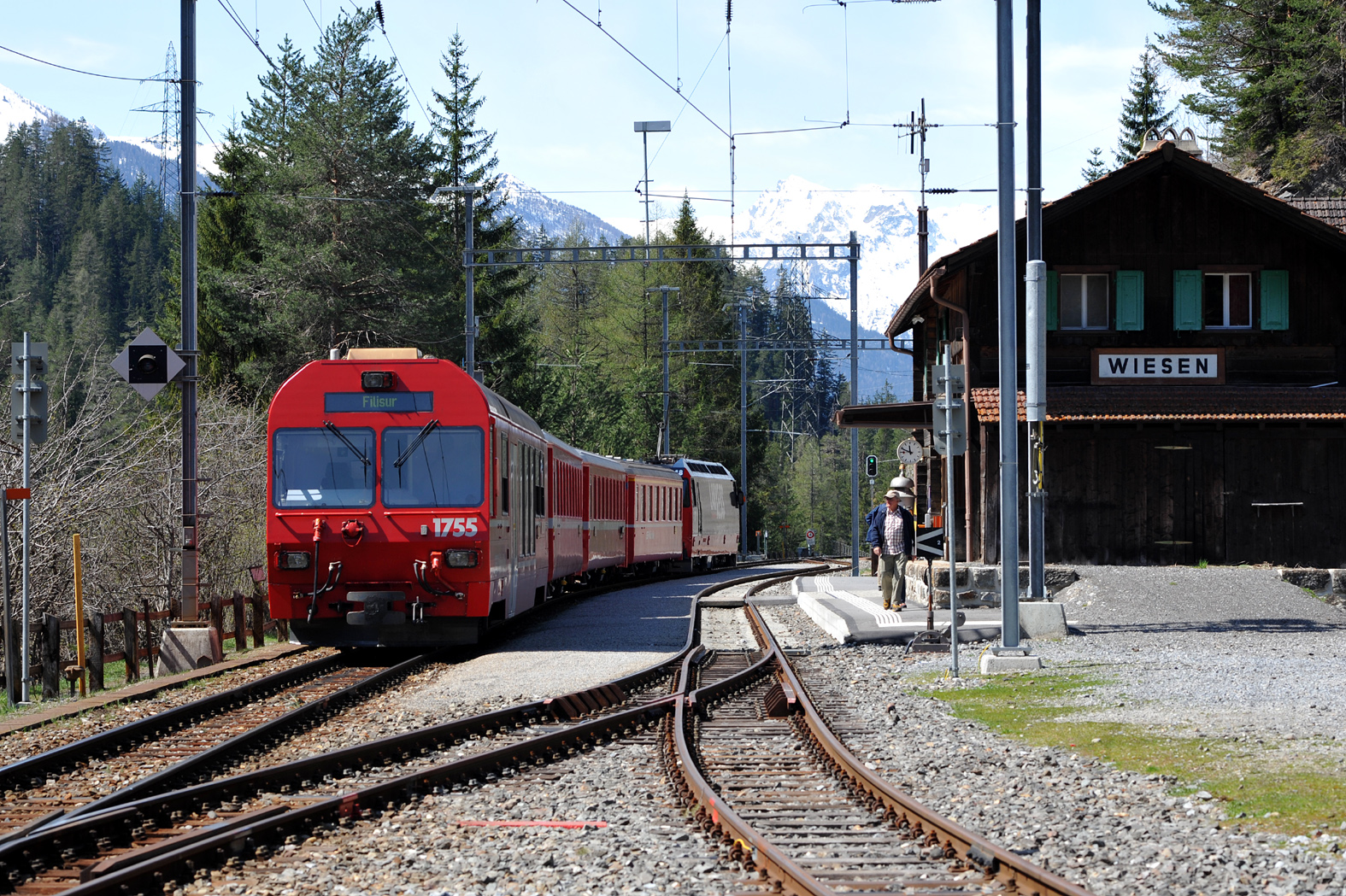
A Regio service leaves Wiesen station towards Filisur with the locomotive in front

The route is mainly served by Regio trains at regular intervals. An hourly rate is offered between 6:05 am and 9:30 pm with the Regios taking around 25 minutes each way. The use of railcars or push–pull trains, which eliminates the need to run the locomotive around at the terminus and, due to a short turnaround in Filisur, does not usually result in Regio trains crossing at the intermediate stations of the line. Locomotives Ge 4/4 iii 641 to 652 and trainsets of class Abe 8/12 3501 to 3515 are used.

In addition to this, the RhB also offers seasonal through trains that run from Davos via Filisur, the Albula line and the Bernina Railway to Tirano in Italy. The 2019 timetable includes a Bernina Express to Tirano in the morning and from Tirano in the afternoon, which are scheduled to cross Regio services in Davos Wiesen at 10:09 am and in Davos Glaris at 6:39 pm.

In addition, there is occasional freight traffic on the line. Along the line there are freight sidings for waste disposal in Davos Islen and for connecting to the gravel work and the arsenal in Davos Frauenkirch.
