= Filisur railway station =

Railway station in Switzerland

Filisur
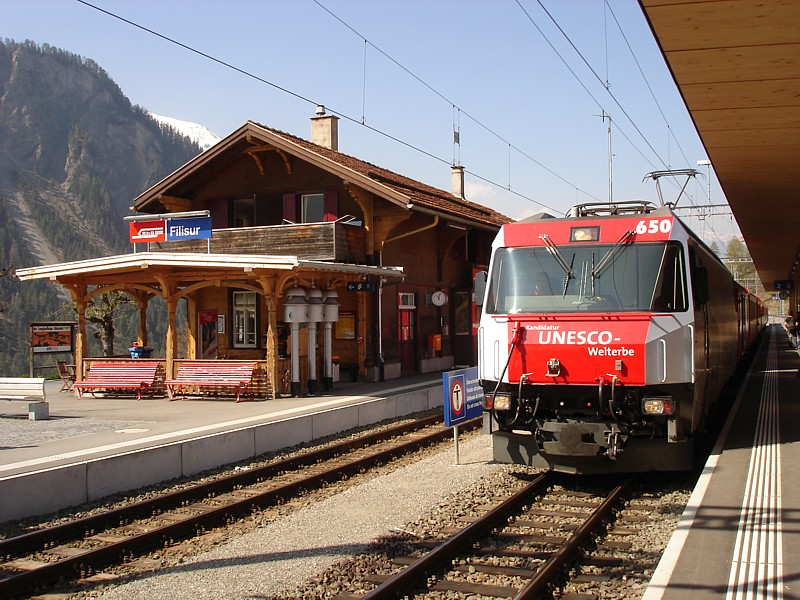
- A Rhaetian Railway train at platform 2 of the station in 2007

General information
- Location: Bahnhofstrasse; Filisur; Switzerland
- Coordinates: 46°40′31″N 9°40′56″E
- Elevation: 1,080 m (3,540 ft)
- Owner: Rhaetian Railway
- Lines: Albula line; Davos Platz–Filisur line
- Distance: 64.4 km (40.0 mi) from Landquart (via Albula); 69.3 km (43.1 mi) from Landquart (via Davos Platz)
- Platforms: 2
- Tracks: 3
- Train operators: Glacier Express; Rhaetian Railway
- Connections: PostAuto Schweiz buses

History
- Opened: 1 July 1903
- Electrified: 20 April 1919

Passengers
- 2018: 1,300 per weekday

Services
Preceding station	Rhaetian Railway	Following station
Bergün/Bravuogn towards Tirano	Bernina Express	Tiefencastel towards Chur
Bergün/Bravuogn towards St. Moritz	IR 38	Tiefencastel towards Chur
Terminus	R 11	Davos Wiesen towards Davos Platz
Preceding station	Glacier Express	Following station
Samedan towards St. Moritz	Glacier Express	Tiefencastel towards Zermatt
Location

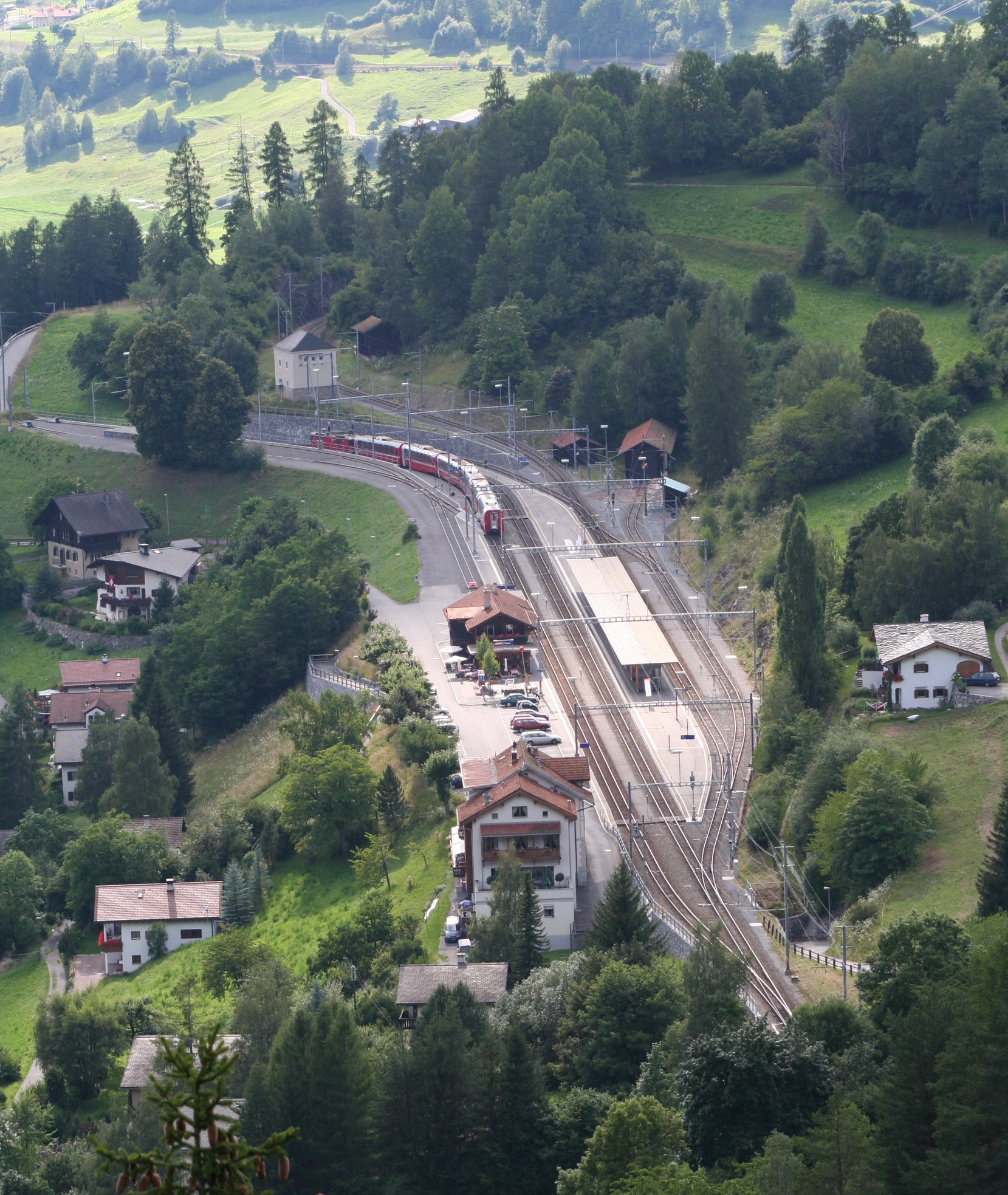
Filisur station from above

Filisur railway station is a railway station in the municipality of Filisur, in the Swiss canton of Graubünden. It is located at the junction of the 1,000 mm (3 ft 3 3/8 in) metre gauge Albula and Davos Platz–Filisur lines of the Rhaetian Railway. Hourly services operate on both lines.

There are currently three platforms in use at Filisur station. From the direction of Chur, the line passes through Thusis and Tiefencastel. It then crosses two of the Rhaetian Railway's major railway bridges before arriving in Filisur: the Schmittentobel Viaduct, and the Landwasser Viaduct. On the Davos to Filisur line, trains from Davos similarly cross the Wiesen Viaduct just before entering Filisur.

== Services ==
As of the December 2023 timetable change, the following services stop at Filisur:

- Glacier Express: Several round-trips per day between Zermatt and St. Moritz.
- Bernina Express: Several round-trips per day between Chur and Tirano.
- InterRegio: hourly service between Chur and St. Moritz.
- Regio: hourly service to Davos Platz.

== Gallery of nearby bridges ==
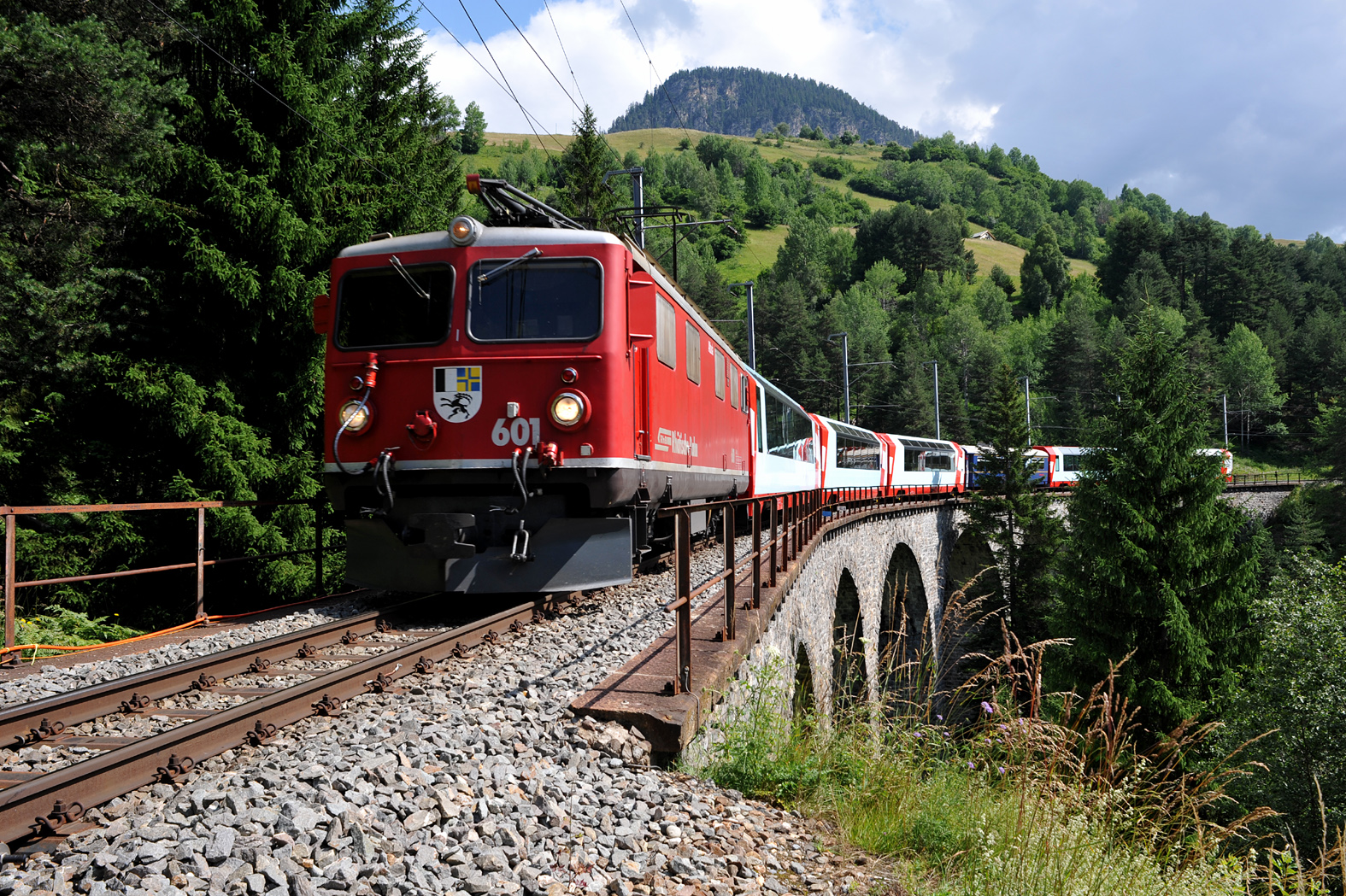
Schmittentobel Viaduct

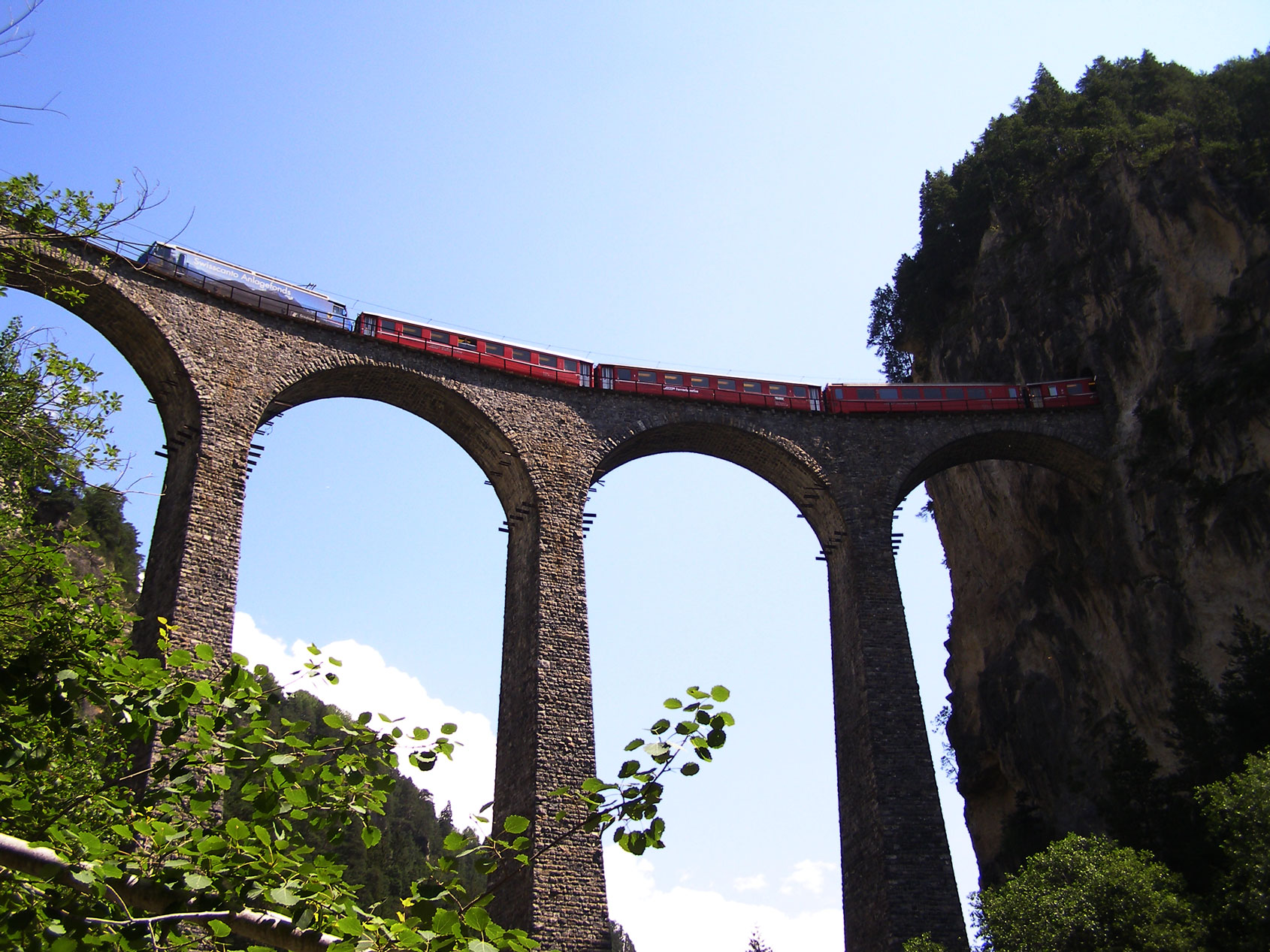
Landwasser Viaduct

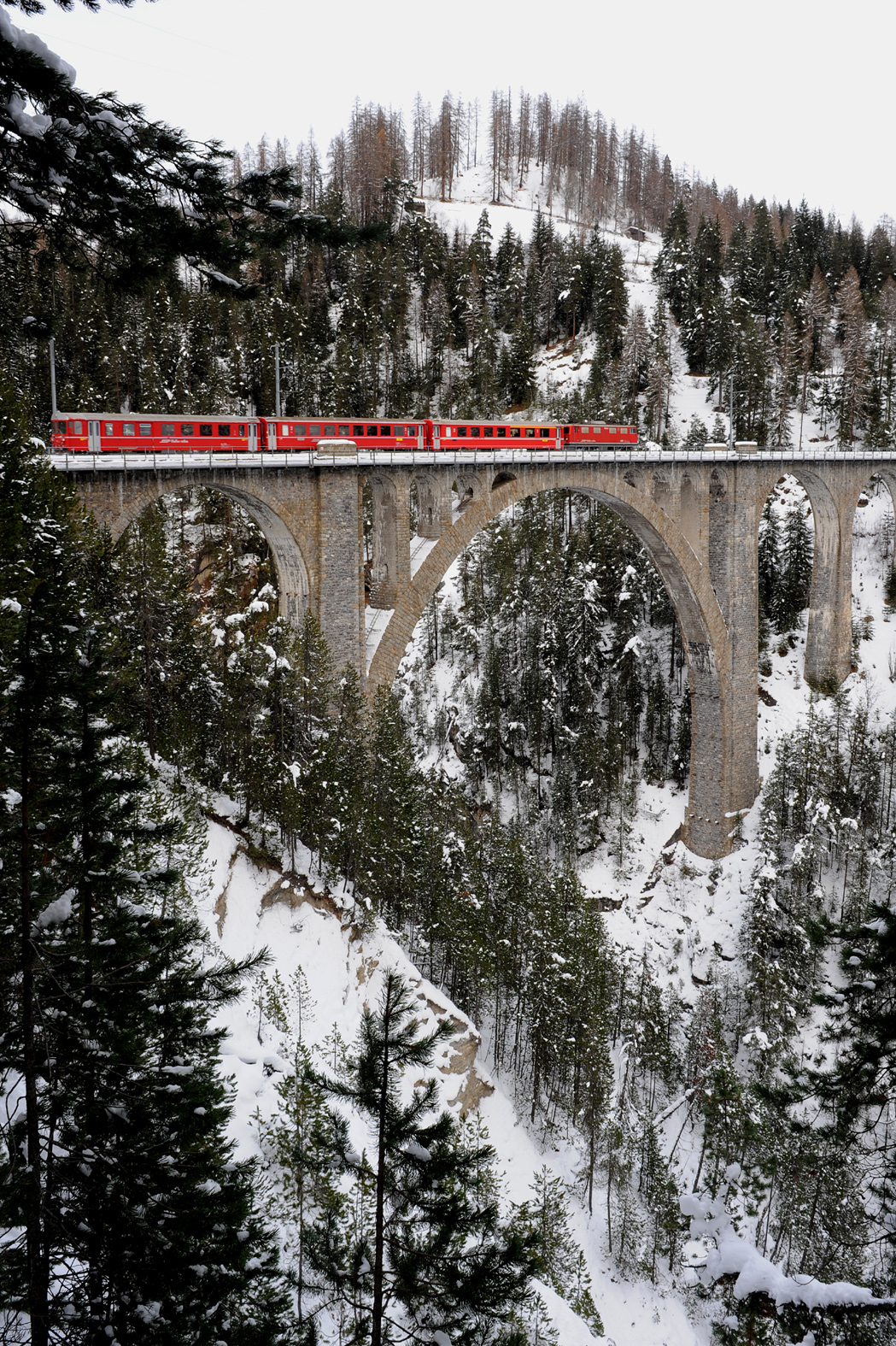
Wiesen Viaduct
