= Davos Platz railway station =

Railway station in Switzerland

Davos Platz
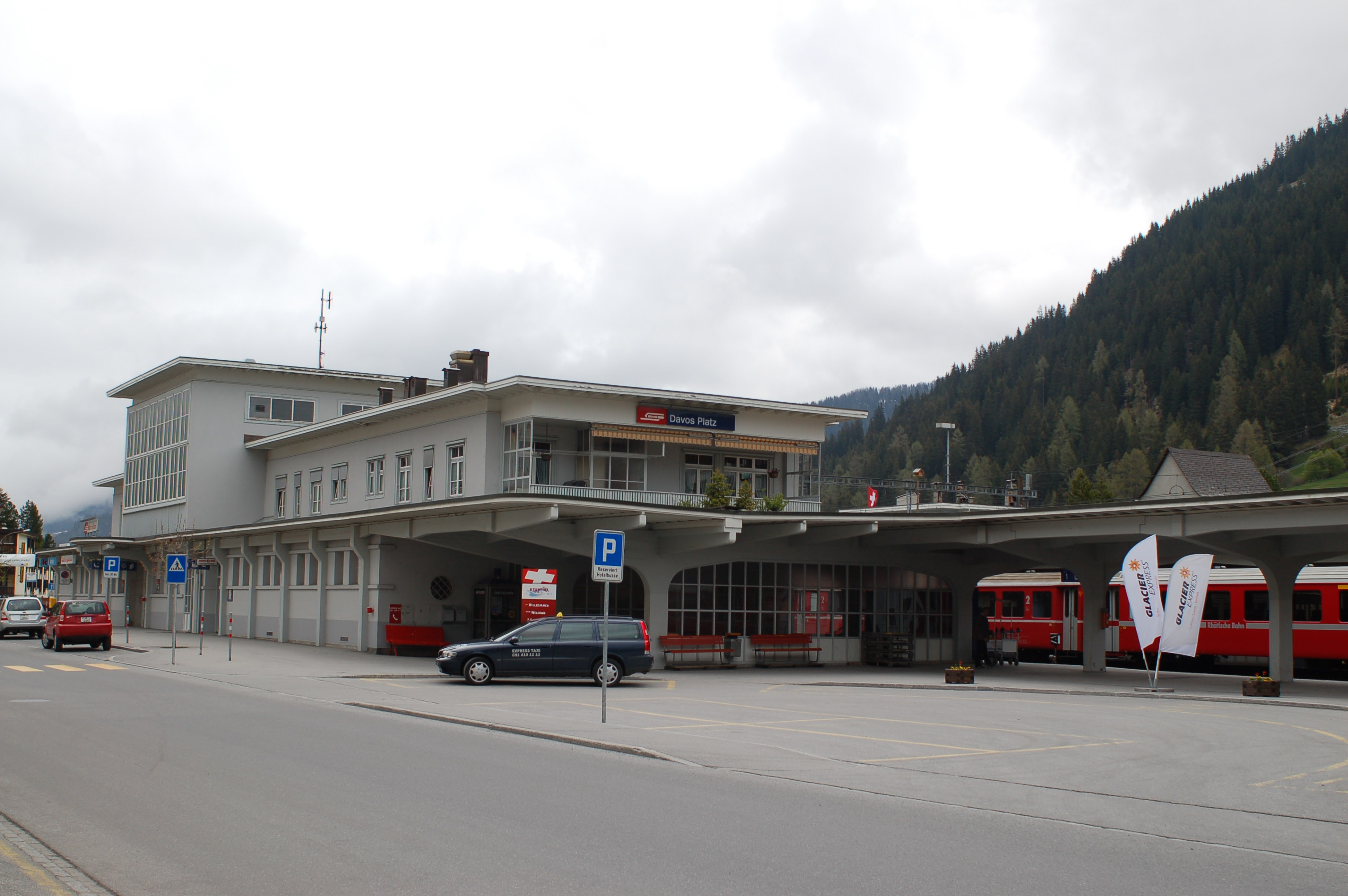
- The station building in 2008

General information
- Location: Talstrasse; 7270 Davos; Davos; Switzerland
- Coordinates: 46°47′29″N 9°49′15″E
- Elevation: 1,540 m (5,050 ft)
- Owner: Rhaetian Railway
- Lines: Davos Platz–Filisur line; Landquart–Davos Platz line
- Distance: 50.0 km (31.1 mi) from Landquart
- Train operators: Rhaetian Railway
- Connections: PostAuto Schweiz buses

Construction
- Architect: Rudolf Gabarel (1949)

Other information
- IATA code: ZDV

History
- Opened: 21 July 1890; 136 years ago
- Electrified: 22 December 1919; 106 years ago

Passengers
- 2018: 2,500 per weekday

Services
Preceding station	Rhaetian Railway	Following station
Davos Dorf towards Landquart	RE 1	Terminus
Davos Dorf towards Landquart	RE 2	Terminus
Davos Frauenkirch towards Filisur	R 11	Terminus
Location

Davos Platz railway station is a railway station in the municipality of Davos in the district of Prattigau/Davos in the Swiss canton of Graubünden.

It is the terminus of the Landquart–Davos Platz railway and the Davos Platz–Filisur railway. Northbound, there is a half-hourly service towards Landquart. Southbound, there is an hourly service to Filisur. The station also serves as a hub for local bus services. Davos Dorf station is located about 2.5 km northeast of Davos Platz.

The station currently has three platforms in use.

The lower station of the funicular Schatzalp-Bahn is located nearby.

== Services ==
As of the December 2023 timetable change, the following services stop at Davos Platz:

- RegioExpress: half-hourly service to Landquart.
- Regio: hourly service to Filisur.

== See also ==
- Rail transport in Switzerland
