= S-chanf =

- Municipality
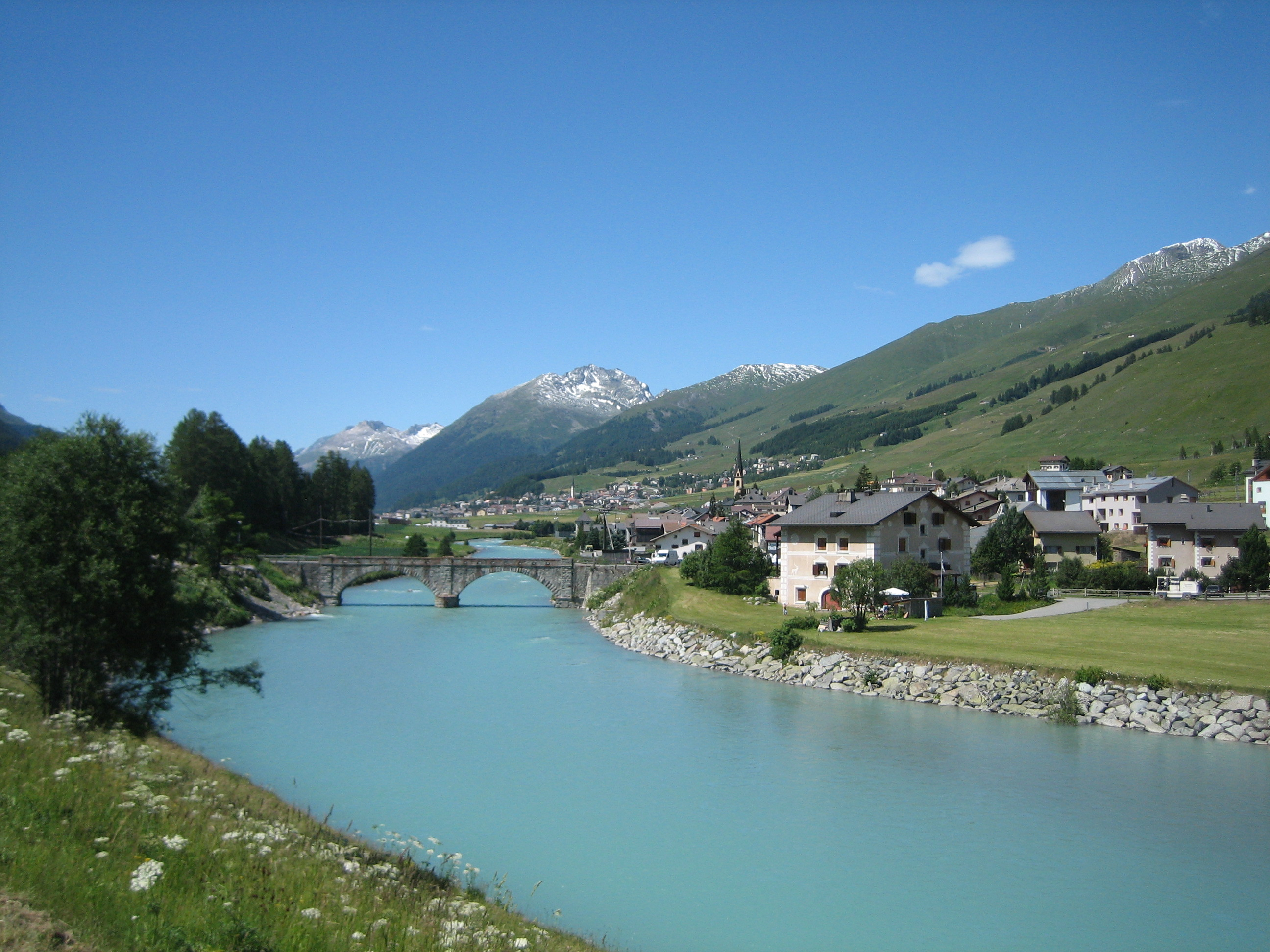

- Flag Coat of arms
- Location of S-chanf
- Location within Switzerland Location within Canton of Grisons
- Coordinates: 46°37′N 9°59′E
- Country: Switzerland
- Canton: Grisons
- District: Maloja

Area
  - Total: 137.90 km^{2} (53.24 sq mi)
- Elevation: 1,660 m (5,450 ft)

Population (December 2020)
  - Total: 697
  - Density: 5.05/km^{2} (13.1/sq mi)
- Time zone: UTC+01:00 (CET)
  - Summer (DST): UTC+02:00 (CEST)
- Postal code: 7525
- SFOS number: 3788
- ISO 3166 code: CH-GR
- Surrounded by: Bergün/Bravuogn, Davos, Livigno (IT-SO), Madulain, Susch, Zernez, Zuoz
- Website: www.s-chanf.ch

S-chanf (Romansh pronunciation: [ʃtɕamf]; German: Scanfs; Italian: Scanevo) is a municipality in the Maloja Region in the Swiss canton of the Grisons.

Localities in the municipality of S-chanf include Susauna, Chapella and Cinuos-chel.

== Name ==
S-chanf is first mentioned around 1137–1139 as Scaneves. In 1356 it was mentioned as Scanevo. The German Scanfs was official until 1943. Chapella is the site of a chapel mentioned in 1209. Susauna is mentioned as Sauzana in 1285.

== Geography ==
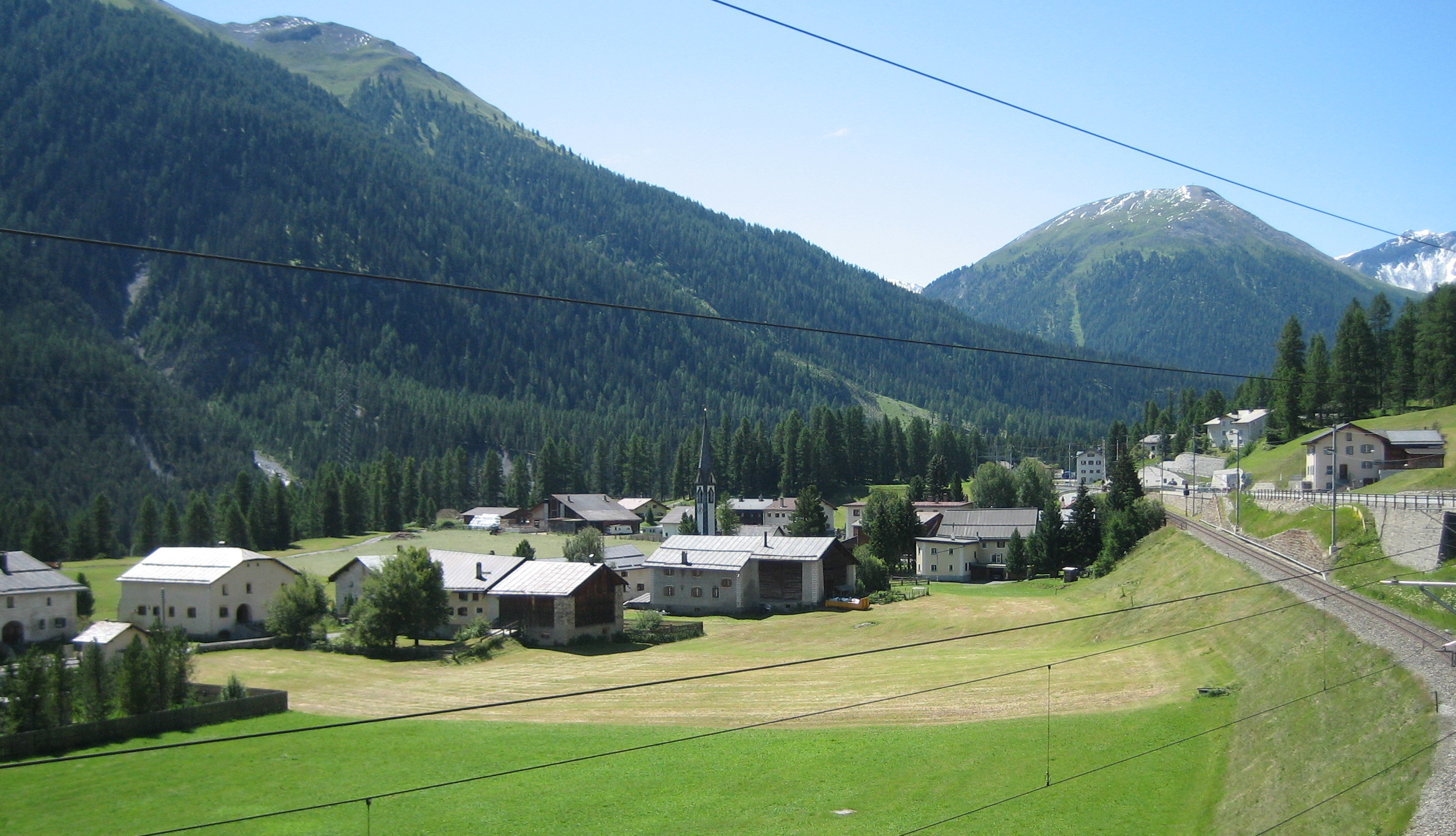
Cinuos-chel village in S-chanf

Aerial view by Walter Mittelholzer (1925)

S-chanf has an area, as of 2006, of 138 km^{2} (53 sq mi). Of this area, 23.7% is used for agricultural purposes, while 18.6% is forested. Of the rest of the land, 0.6% is settled (buildings or roads) and the remainder (57.1%) is nonproductive (rivers, glaciers or mountains).

Before 2017, the municipality was located in the Oberengadin subdistrict of the Maloja district along the Inn river and at the mouth of the Casanna pass. After 2017 it is part of the Maloja Region. It consists of the linear village of S-chanf with the sections of Cinuos-chel and Susauna. The village's elevation is 1,662 meters (5,453 ft).

Susauna is a hamlet on the territory of S-chanf municipality, situated on the road to Scaletta Pass, a historic international trading route.

== Demographics ==
In 1850, S-chanf had a population of 439, all Romansh speaking. The population declined to 402 by 1900 and rose again to 460 by 1950. S-chanf has a population (as of 31 December 2020) of 697. As of 2008, 11.4% of the population were foreign nationals. Over the last 10 years the population has grown at a rate of 7.5% per annum.

As of 2000, the gender distribution of the population was 50.7% male and 49.3% female. The age distribution, as of 2000, in S-chanf was 66 children, or 10.6% of the population, between 0 and 9 years old; 46 teenagers, or 7.4%, between 10 and 14; and 46 teenagers, or 7.4%, between 15 and 19. Of the adult population, 74 people, or 11.9% of the population, were between 20 and 29 years old; 119 people, or 19.2%, were between 30 and 39; 82 people, or 13.2%, were between 40 and 49; and 73 people, or 11.8%, were between 50 and 59. The senior-population distribution was 43 people, or 6.9% of the population, between 60 and 69 years old; 47 people, or 7.6%, between 70 and 79; 21 people, or 3.4%, between 80 and 89; and 3 people, or 0.5%, between 90 and 99.

In the 2007 federal election the most popular party was the SVP, which received 44.9% of the vote. The next three most popular parties were the FDP (24.5%), the SP (23.8%), and the CVP (5.4%).

In S-chanf about 67% of the population (between ages 25 and 64) have completed either nonmandatory upper secondary education or additional higher education (either university or a Fachhochschule).

S-chanf has an unemployment rate of 1.49%. As of 2005, there were 45 people employed in the primary (extraction) economic sector and about 21 businesses involved in this sector; 51 people employed in the secondary (manufacturing) sector, with 6 businesses; and 119 people employed in the tertiary (service) sector, with 32 businesses.

The historical population is given in the following table:

year	population
1781	423
1806	450
1850	439
1900	402
1950	460
2000	620

=== Languages ===
Most of the population (as of 2000) speaks Romansh (51.8%), with German being second most common (37.3%) and Italian being third (5.6%). The population speaks either the Upper-Engadin Romansh dialect of Puter or a Bündner variety of Alemannic German. About 68% of the population could understand Romansh at least passively.

Until the mid-19th century, all residents of the village spoke Romansh, but due to increasing trade with the outside world, its usage began to decline. In 1880 about 86% spoke Romansh as a first language; in 1910, 92%; and in 1941, 81%. By 1970 this figure had dropped to 65% and, by 2000, to 52%.

Languages in S-chanf
Languages	Census 1980		Census 1990		Census 2000	
Languages	Number	Percent	Number	Percent	Number	Percent
German	74	16.02%	129	25.60%	231	37.26%
Romansh	344	74.46%	336	66.67%	321	51.77%
Italian	26	5.63%	27	5.36%	35	5.65%
Population	462	100%	504	100%	620	100%

== Tourism and infrastructure ==
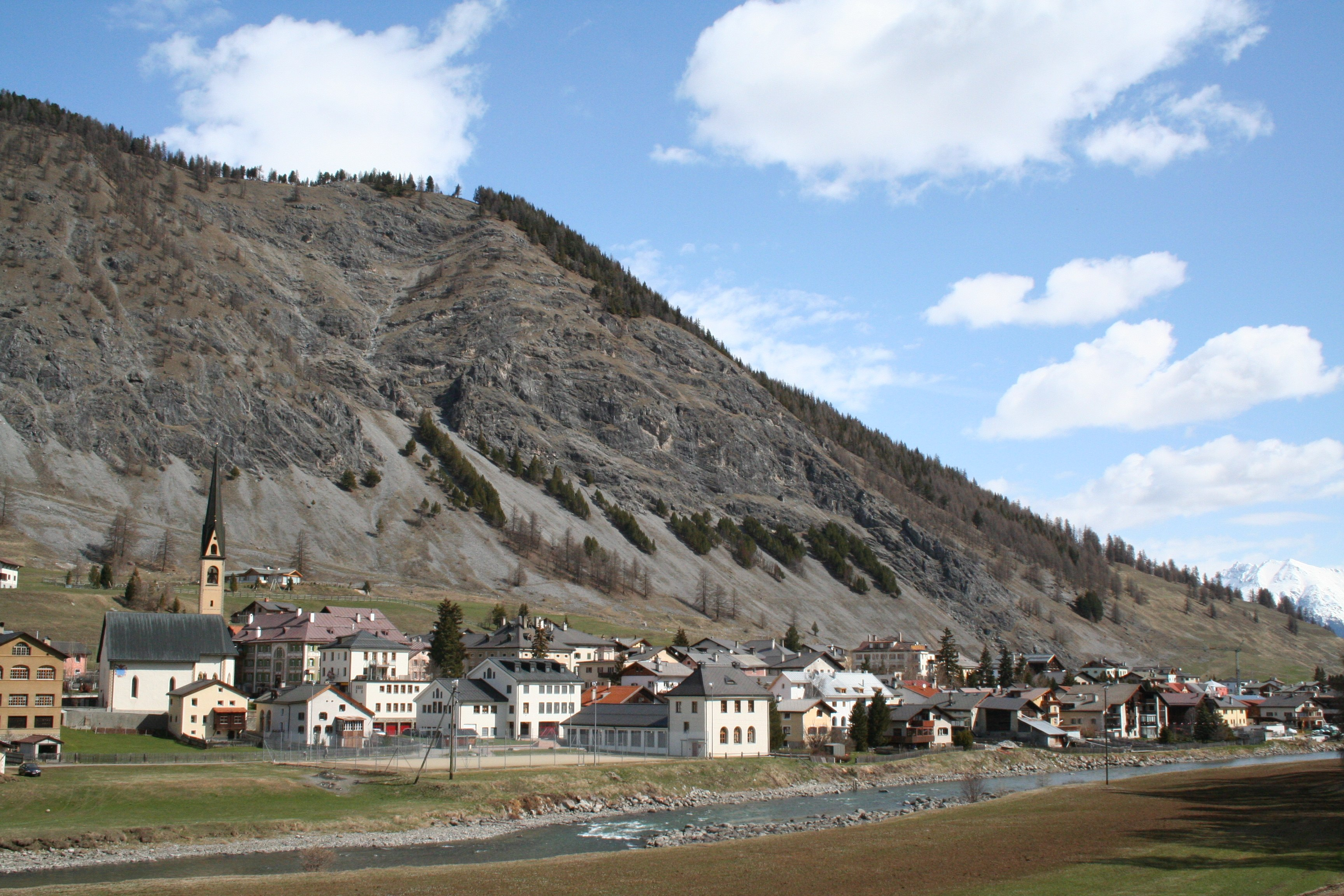
S-chanf

S-chanf is one of the pedestrian gateways into the Swiss National Park, as it is near the confluence of the Val Trupchun, a pedestrian only area of the park, and the Engadin. In the park, early risers may spot marmots and, high on the mountains, Steinbok (ibex). It has at least two hotels: the Aurora and the Scaletta.

S-chanf is the final destination of the "Engadin Skimarathon", a popular cross country ski race over marathon distance, which starts in Maloja.

The twin homes and barn at Nrs. 216/217 and the home with barn at Nr. 107 are listed as Swiss heritage sites of national significance.

S-chanf is the home to a base of the Swiss Air Force, which maintains one of its antiaircraft target shooting ranges (serving also as finish area of the "Engadine Ski Marathon") in that area.

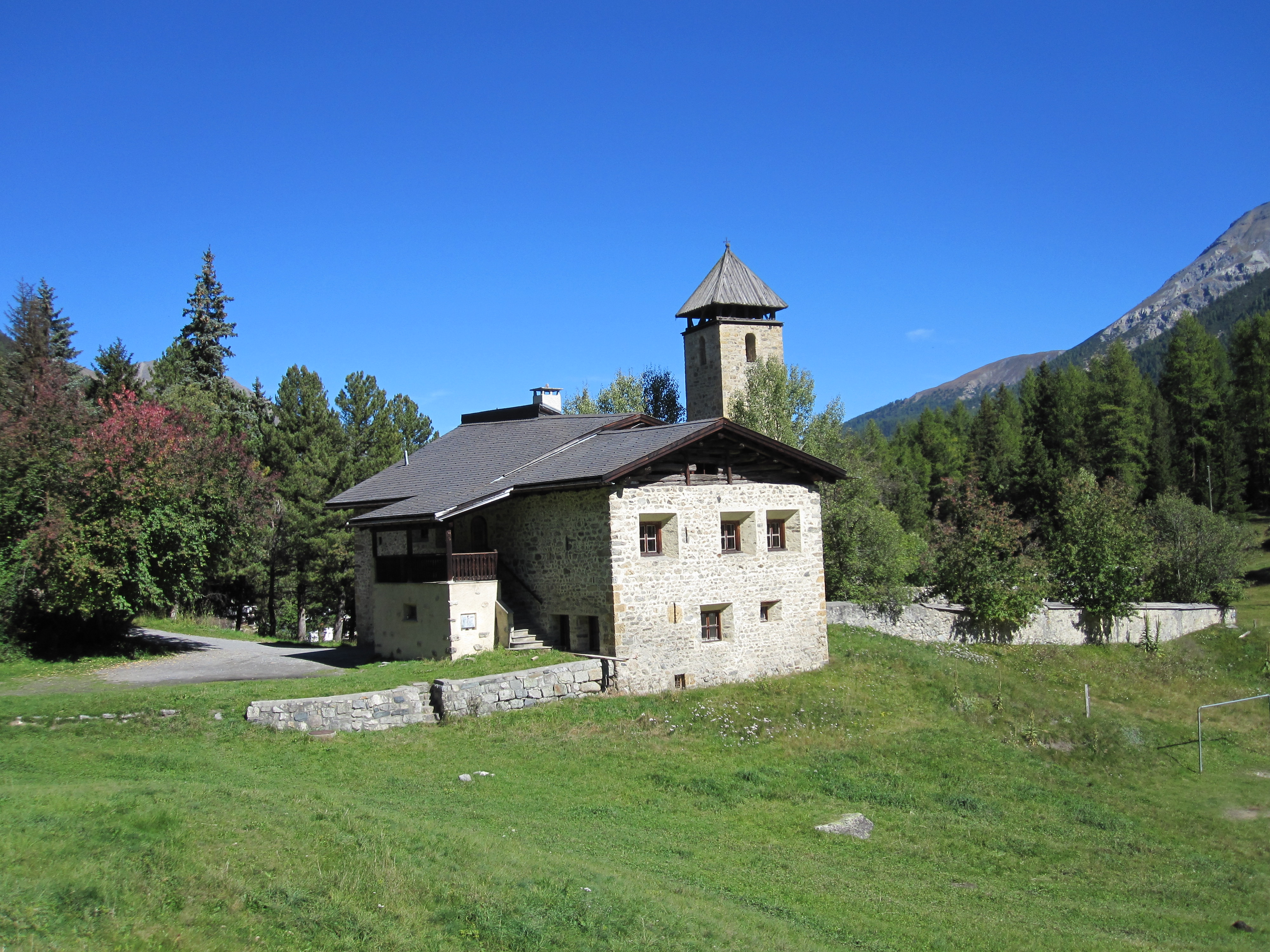
The hospice at La Chapella

The hospice at La Chapella dates to about 1250. It was abandoned in the late 18th century, and re-opened as a youth center in 1967.

The chapel at Susauna dates to 1696, which had its own pastors from 1723 to 1834. It was abandoned in the 20th century and is now inhabited only seasonally.

== Transportation ==
The municipality has two railway stations: S-chanf and Cinuos-chel-Brail. Both are located on the Bever–Scuol-Tarasp line and have regular service to St. Moritz, Landquart, Scuol-Tarasp, and Pontresina.
