= La Punt Chamues-ch =

- Municipality
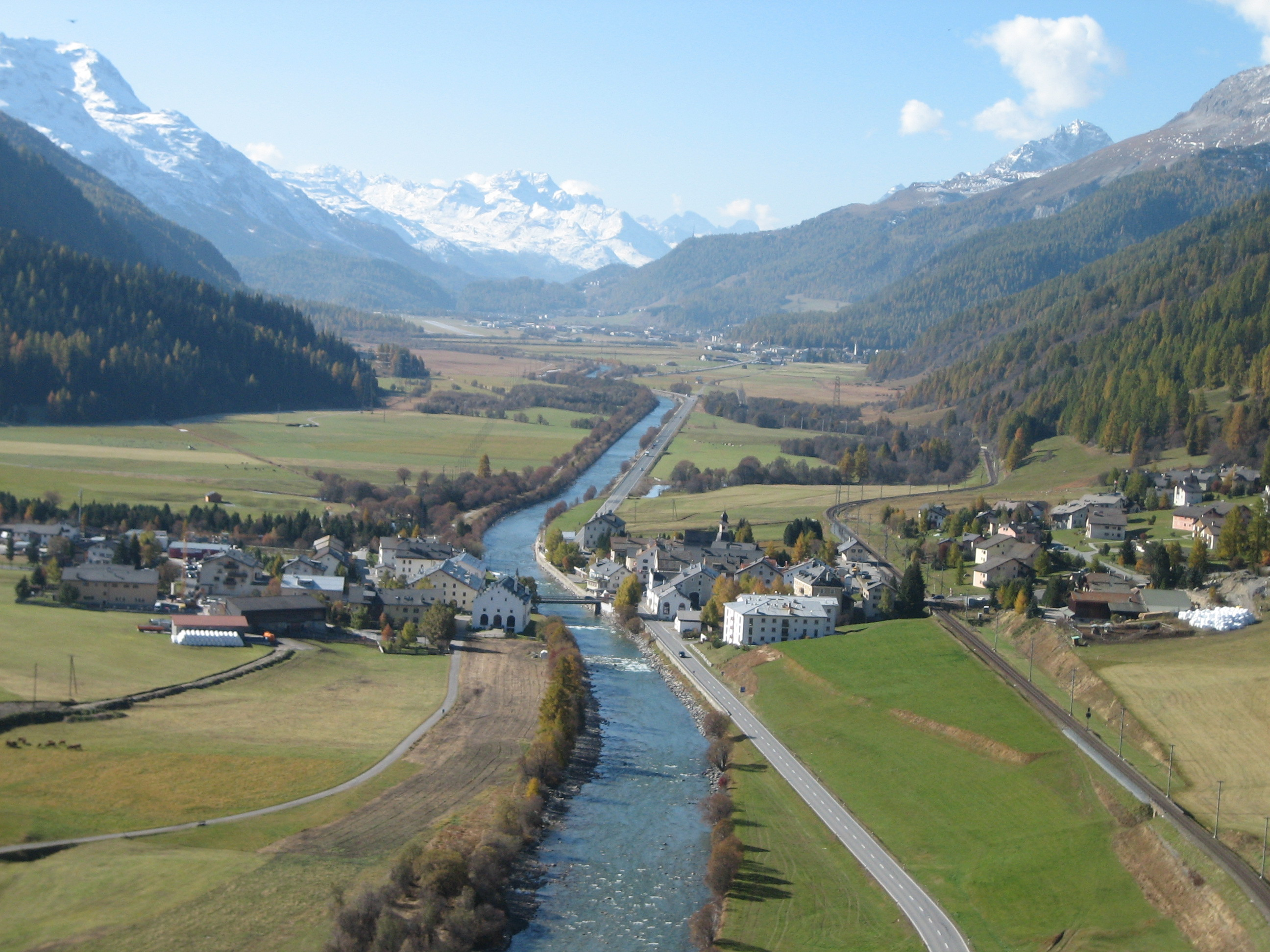

- Flag Coat of arms
- Location of La Punt Chamues-ch
- Location within Switzerland Location within Canton of Grisons
- Coordinates: 46°34′N 9°55′E
- Country: Switzerland
- Canton: Grisons
- District: Maloja

Area
  - Total: 62.3 km^{2} (24.1 sq mi)
- Elevation: 1,687 m (5,535 ft)

Population (December 2020)
  - Total: 686
  - Density: 11.0/km^{2} (28.5/sq mi)
- Time zone: UTC+01:00 (CET)
  - Summer (DST): UTC+02:00 (CEST)
- Postal code: 7522
- SFOS number: 3785
- ISO 3166 code: CH-GR
- Localities: La Punt, Chamues-ch
- Surrounded by: Bergün/Bravuogn, Bever, Madulain, Pontresina, Samedan, Zuoz
- Website: www.lapunt.ch

La Punt Chamues-ch (Romansh pronunciation: [lɐ ˈpʊnt tɕaˈmweːʃtɕ]; Italian and official name until 1943: Ponte-Campovasto) is a municipality in the Maloja Region in the Swiss canton of the Grisons.

== History ==
La Punt Chamues-ch is first mentioned around 1137-39 as Campolovasto. In 1244 it was mentioned as Ponte.

== Geography ==
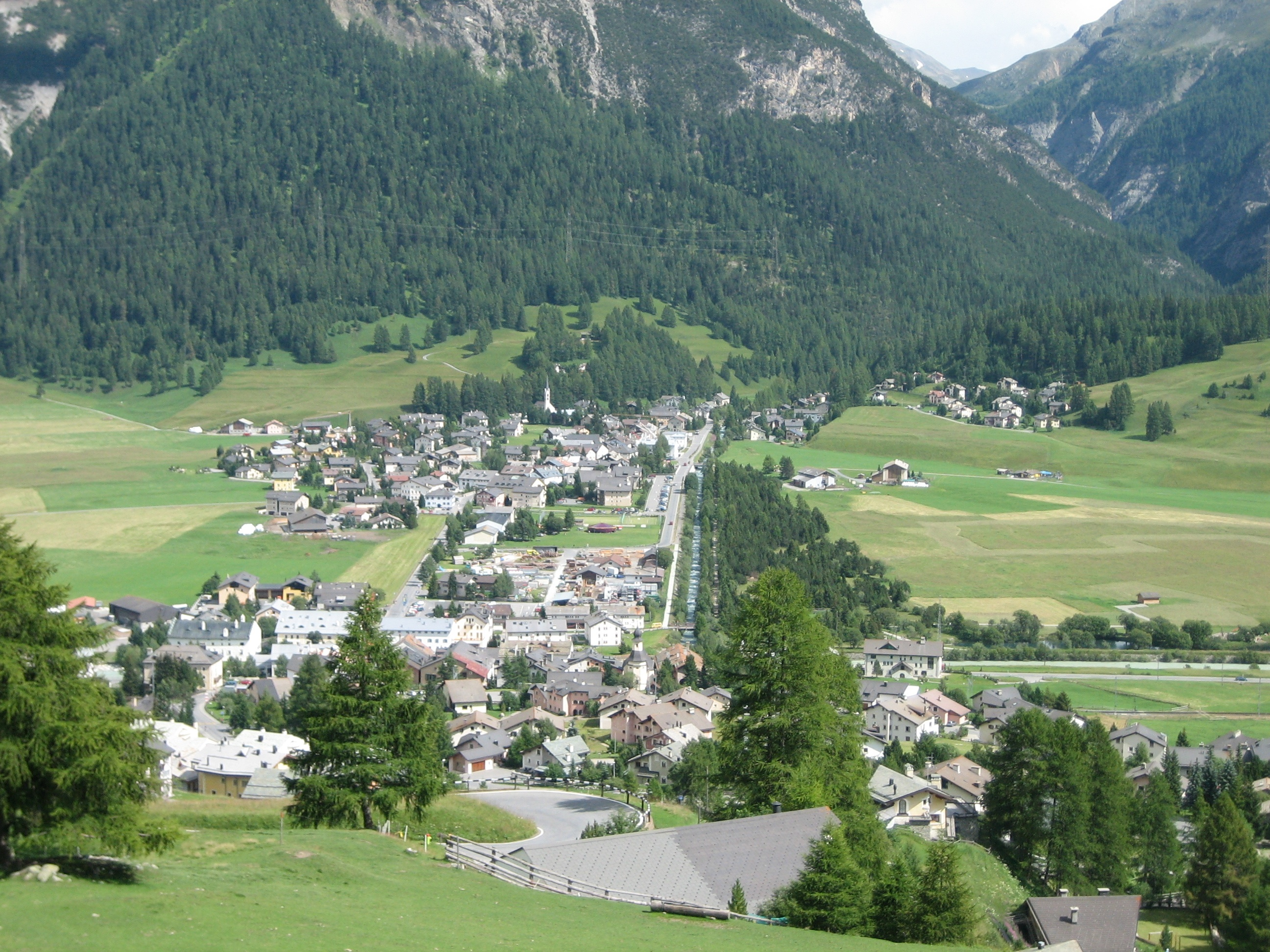
La Punt Chamues-ch

Aerial view (1964)

La Punt Chamues-ch has an area, as of 2006, of 63.2 km^{2} (24.4 sq mi). Of this area, 33.2% is used for agricultural purposes, while 15.4% is forested. Of the rest of the land, 1.1% is settled (buildings or roads) and the remainder (50.4%) is non-productive (rivers, glaciers or mountains).

Before 2017, the municipality was located in the Oberengadin sub-district of the Maloja district, after 2017 it was part of the Maloja Region. The municipality consists of two once separate towns, nowadays almost grown together. La Punt lies on the northern side of the valley, where the Albula Pass ends. The railway line, with a station, and the main road – road 27 – also pass through La Punt, as does the Inn river. Chamues-ch (pronounced Tshamois-tsh), which lies on the southern side of the valley, at the end of the Val Chamuera valley and on the foot of the Piz Mezzaun.

Both towns feature hotels and some stores, while the buildings used by the municipality and fire department lie in between.

Until 1943 La Punt Chamues-ch was known as by its Italian name of Ponte-Campovasto.

== Demographics ==
La Punt Chamues-ch has a population (as of 31 December 2020) of 686. As of 2008, 21.7% of the population was made up of foreign nationals. Over the last 10 years the population has grown at a rate of 4.4%.

As of 2000, the gender distribution of the population was 48.8% male and 51.2% female. The age distribution, as of 2000, in La Punt Chamues-ch is; 77 children or 11.7% of the population are between 0 and 9 years old. 47 teenagers or 7.1% are 10 to 14, and 36 teenagers or 5.5% are 15 to 19. Of the adult population, 73 people or 11.1% of the population are between 20 and 29 years old. 110 people or 16.7% are 30 to 39, 114 people or 17.3% are 40 to 49, and 100 people or 15.2% are 50 to 59. The senior population distribution is 54 people or 8.2% of the population are between 60 and 69 years old, 37 people or 5.6% are 70 to 79, there are 11 people or 1.7% who are 80 to 89, and there is 1 person who is 90 to 99.

In the 2007 federal election the most popular party was the SVP which received 40.5% of the vote. The next three most popular parties were the SP (28%), the FDP (21.6%) and the CVP (6.5%).

In La Punt Chamues-ch about 82.3% of the population (between age 25-64) have completed either non-mandatory upper secondary education or additional higher education (either university or a Fachhochschule).

La Punt Chamues-ch has an unemployment rate of 0.97%. As of 2005, there were 27 people employed in the primary economic sector and about 11 businesses involved in this sector. 64 people are employed in the secondary sector and there are 11 businesses in this sector. 147 people are employed in the tertiary sector, with 45 businesses in this sector.

The historical population is given in the following table:

year	population
1850	232
1870	289
1900	245
1950	223
1990	569
2000	660

== Languages ==
Most of the population (as of 2000) speaks German (66.1%), with Romansh being second most common (20.6%) and Italian being third ( 7.7%). The official languages of the village are the Upper-Engadin Romansh dialect of Puter and German. Originally the entire village spoke Romansh, but due to increasing trade with the outside world Romansh usage began to decline. In 1880 about 71.6% spoke Romansh as a first language, while in 1900 it increased to 80% but in 1910 dropped to 69%. It stayed at that level until about 1970. In 1990 there were 48.3% who understood Romansh in La Punt Chamues-ch and in 2000 it was 47.6%.

Languages in La Punt Chamues-ch
Languages	Census 1980		Census 1990		Census 2000	
Languages	Number	Percent	Number	Percent	Number	Percent
German	156	40.00%	341	59.93%	436	66.06%
Romansh	162	41.54%	145	25.48%	136	20.61%
Italian	39	10.00%	52	9.14%	51	7.73%
Population	390	100%	569	100%	660	100%

== Heritage sites of national significance ==
The Albertini-Houses N. 324/325 and the Chesa Merleda are listed as Swiss heritage sites of national significance. Both the Albertini houses and the Chesa Mereleda are old Engadin style patrician houses for the Nereda-Albertini family from the 17th Century.

== Transportation ==
The municipality has a railway station, La Punt Chamues-ch, on the Bever–Scuol-Tarasp line. It has regular service to St. Moritz, Landquart, Scuol-Tarasp, and Pontresina.
