= Zuoz =

- Municipality
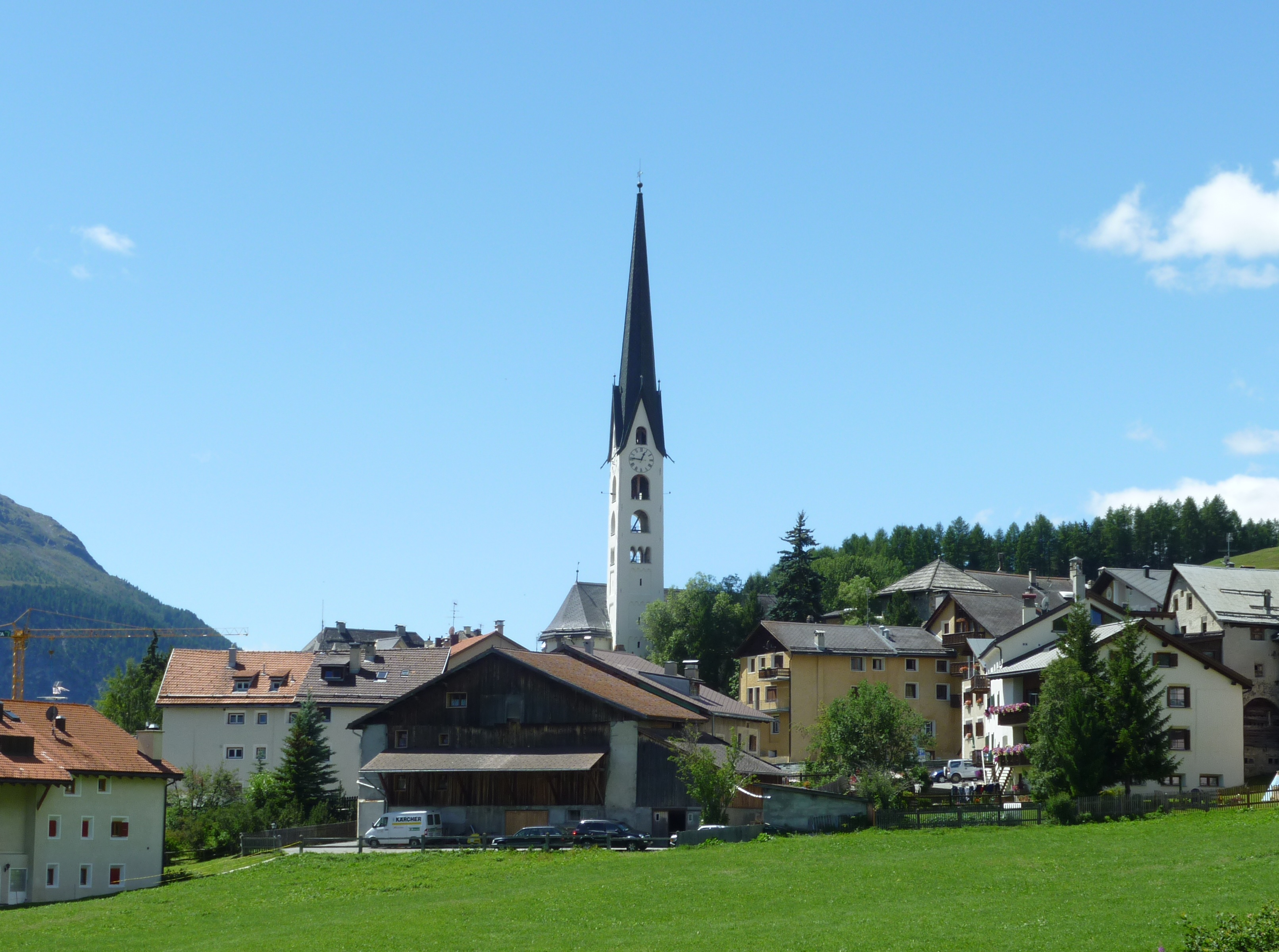

- Flag Coat of arms
- Location of Zuoz
- Location within Switzerland Location within Canton of Grisons
- Coordinates: 46°36′N 9°58′E
- Country: Switzerland
- Canton: Grisons
- District: Maloja

Area
  - Total: 65.62 km^{2} (25.34 sq mi)
- Elevation: 1,716 m (5,630 ft)

Population (December 2020)
  - Total: 1,199
  - Density: 18.27/km^{2} (47.32/sq mi)
- Time zone: UTC+01:00 (CET)
  - Summer (DST): UTC+02:00 (CEST)
- Postal code: 7524
- SFOS number: 3791
- ISO 3166 code: CH-GR
- Surrounded by: Bergün/Bravuogn, La Punt Chamues-ch, Livigno (IT-SO), Madulain, Pontresina, S-chanf
- Website: www.zuoz.ch

Zuoz (Romansh pronunciation: [tsuə̯ts]) is a municipality in the Maloja Region in the Swiss canton of the Grisons.

== History ==
Zuoz is first mentioned about 840 as Zuzes. Historically, Zuoz was the political center of the upper Engadin. It was the seat of the local bishop. But, it has long ago been supplanted by other Engadin villages such as St. Moritz and Samedan.

In 1137-39 the village was acquired from the count von Gamertingen by the Bishop of Chur. In 1244 Bishop Volkart appointed Andreas Planta from Zuoz to be the chancellor of the Oberengadin. The Planta family remained in power until 1798. In 1367, Zuoz joined the League of God's House under the leadership of the Amtmann Thomas Planta.

The continuing arguments between Zuoz and Samedan led, in 1438, to the division of the court into two parts, the courts of Sur and Suot Funtauna Merla. In 1492, the village bought the Bishop's property and rights to tax in Zuoz. Then, in 1526 the Bishop lost the right to high justice with the Ilanzer articles. In the Swabian War the inhabitants ignited their fields to force the enemy to retreat. Over the course of the 15th Century, several villages became independent of Zuoz. S-chanf left in 1518, La Punt Chamues-ch in 1528 and Madulain in 1534. In 1554, Zuoz joined the Protestant Reformation and converted.

In 1512, the Three Leagues conquered the Valtellina valley. The improved trade routes and money that this valley brought, led to a golden age in the Engadin valley. During this time in Zuoz; a Latin school was established, the first written Romansh language was developed and choir singing spread in both religious and everyday theater. In addition Zuozer students visited foreign schools.

After the Bündner Wirren (or Confusion of the Leagues) from 1618 to 1639, many residents of the village emigrated seeking jobs in other regions. The loss of the Valtellina valley led to further emigrations and loss of political power. Following the end of the Ancien Régime and creation of the Canton of Raetia in the French controlled Helvetic Republic in 1798, all of Zuoz's privileges and political power vanished. It became a simple farming village. Zuoz still practices ancient traditions which date back to long before the Catholic Christianity. These include San Gian and Chalandamarz

== Geography ==
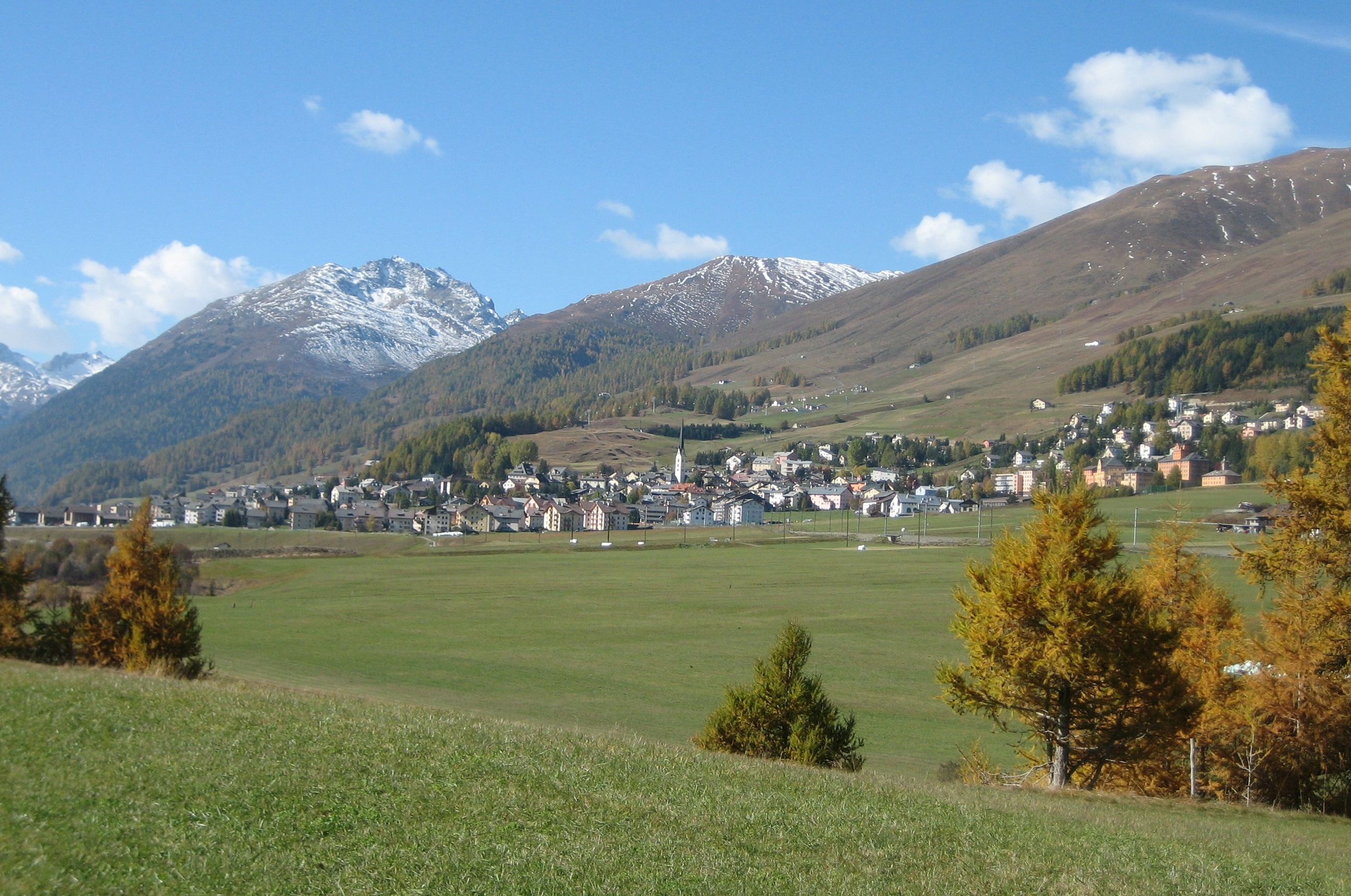
Zuoz Village

Aerial view from 3000 m by Walter Mittelholzer (1923)

Zuoz has an area, as of 2006, of 65.6 km^{2} (25.3 sq mi). Of this area, 49.5% is used for agricultural purposes, while 9.2% is forested. Of the rest of the land, 1.1% is settled (buildings or roads) and the remainder (40.2%) is non-productive (rivers, glaciers or mountains).

Before 2017, the municipality was located in the Oberengadin sub-district of the Maloja district, after 2017 it was part of the Maloja Region. The village center is located on the slope of Munt Albanas and is surrounded by new developments.

== Demographics ==
Zuoz has a population (as of 31 December 2020) of 1,199. As of 2008, 37.0% of the population was made up of foreign nationals. Over the last 10 years the population has decreased at a rate of -5.8%.

As of 2000, the gender distribution of the population was 51.7% male and 48.3% female. The age distribution, as of 2000, in Zuoz is; 127 children or 9.4% of the population are between 0 and 9 years old. 88 teenagers or 6.5% are 10 to 14, and 241 teenagers or 17.8% are 15 to 19. Of the adult population, 154 people or 11.4% of the population are between 20 and 29 years old. 164 people or 12.1% are 30 to 39, 202 people or 14.9% are 40 to 49, and 152 people or 11.2% are 50 to 59. 101 people or 7.5% of the population are between 60 and 69 years old. The senior population distribution is 87 people or 6.4% are 70 to 79, there are 34 people or 2.5% who are 80 to 89, there are 2 people or 0.1% who are 90 to 99, and 1 person who is 100 or more.

In the 2007 federal election the most popular party was the SVP which received 42.3% of the vote. The next three most popular parties were the FDP (25.6%), the SP (25.2%) and the CVP (5%).

In Zuoz about 72.5% of the population (between age 25–64) have completed either non-mandatory upper secondary education or additional higher education (either university or a Fachhochschule).

Zuoz has an unemployment rate of 1.37%. As of 2005, there were 40 people employed in the primary economic sector and about 10 businesses involved in this sector. 116 people are employed in the secondary sector and there are 15 businesses in this sector. 462 people are employed in the tertiary sector, with 59 businesses in this sector.

From the 2000 census, 476 or 35.2% are Roman Catholic, while 667 or 49.3% belonged to the Swiss Reformed Church. Of the rest of the population, there are 36 individuals (or about 2.66% of the population) who belong to the Orthodox Church, and there are 7 individuals (or about 0.52% of the population) who belong to another Christian church. There are 14 (or about 1.03% of the population) who are Islamic. There are 6 individuals (or about 0.44% of the population) who belong to another church (not listed on the census), 107 (or about 7.91% of the population) belong to no church, are agnostic or atheist, and 40 individuals (or about 2.96% of the population) did not answer the question.

The historical population is given in the following table:

year	population
1781	423
1850	378
1900	425
1930	969
1941	693
1950	779
1960	1,001
1970	1,165
1980	1,186
1990	1,199
2000	1,353

== Languages ==
Most of the population (as of 2000) speaks German (53.2%), with Romansh being second most common (25.8%) and Italian being third ( 9.8%). Until the 19th century, the entire population spoke the Upper-Engadin Romansh dialect of Puter. Due to increasing trade with the outside world, Romansh usage began to decline. In 1880 about 85% spoke Romansh as a first language, while in 1910 and again in 1941 it was only 56%.

Languages in Zuoz
Languages	Census 1980		Census 1990		Census 2000	
Languages	Number	Percent	Number	Percent	Number	Percent
German	457	38.53%	547	45.62%	720	53.22%
Romansh	461	38.87%	407	33.94%	349	25.79%
Italian	183	15.43%	144	12.01%	133	9.83%
Population	1186	100%	1199	100%	1353	100%

== Education ==
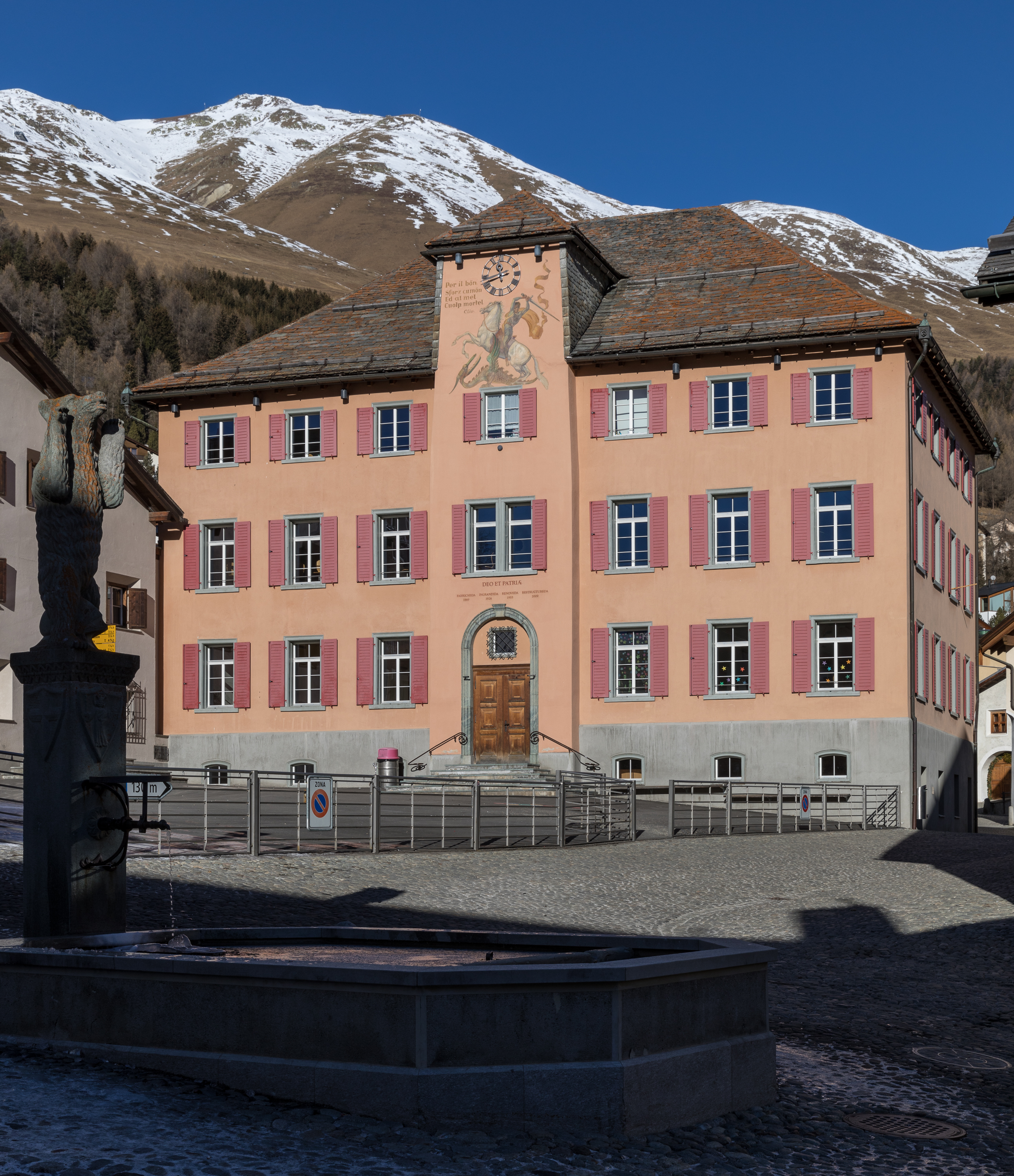
Primary School

The public primary school system is Scoula Zuoz (German: Gemeindeschule Zuoz). Its two sites are Scoula da La Plaiv and Scoula Primara Zuoz. Scuola Primaria Zuoz has primary levels, and da La Plaiv has secondary and realschule classes.

Lyceum Alpinum Zuoz, a private school, is in Zuoz.

== Tourism ==
Zuoz is an example of a traditional Engadin village. It has many cobblestoned streets and old buildings. In the winter it offers a family ski resort with chair and T-bar lifts, as well as a cross-country ski center. In the summer it has a golf course and hiking trails.

Zuoz is home to the Lyceum Alpinum Zuoz, a preparatory school which has a high proportion of foreign nationals.

Hotels include the Posthotel Engadina and Hotel Castell. The latter is a 5-star hotel with several restaurants, a sauna and an outdoor mountain pool.

Zuoz is the location of one of Robert Maillart's pioneering reinforced concrete bridges (1901).

Zuoz also still retains many of its ancient traditions which it inherited from the Roman Empire, including San Gian and Chalandamarz.

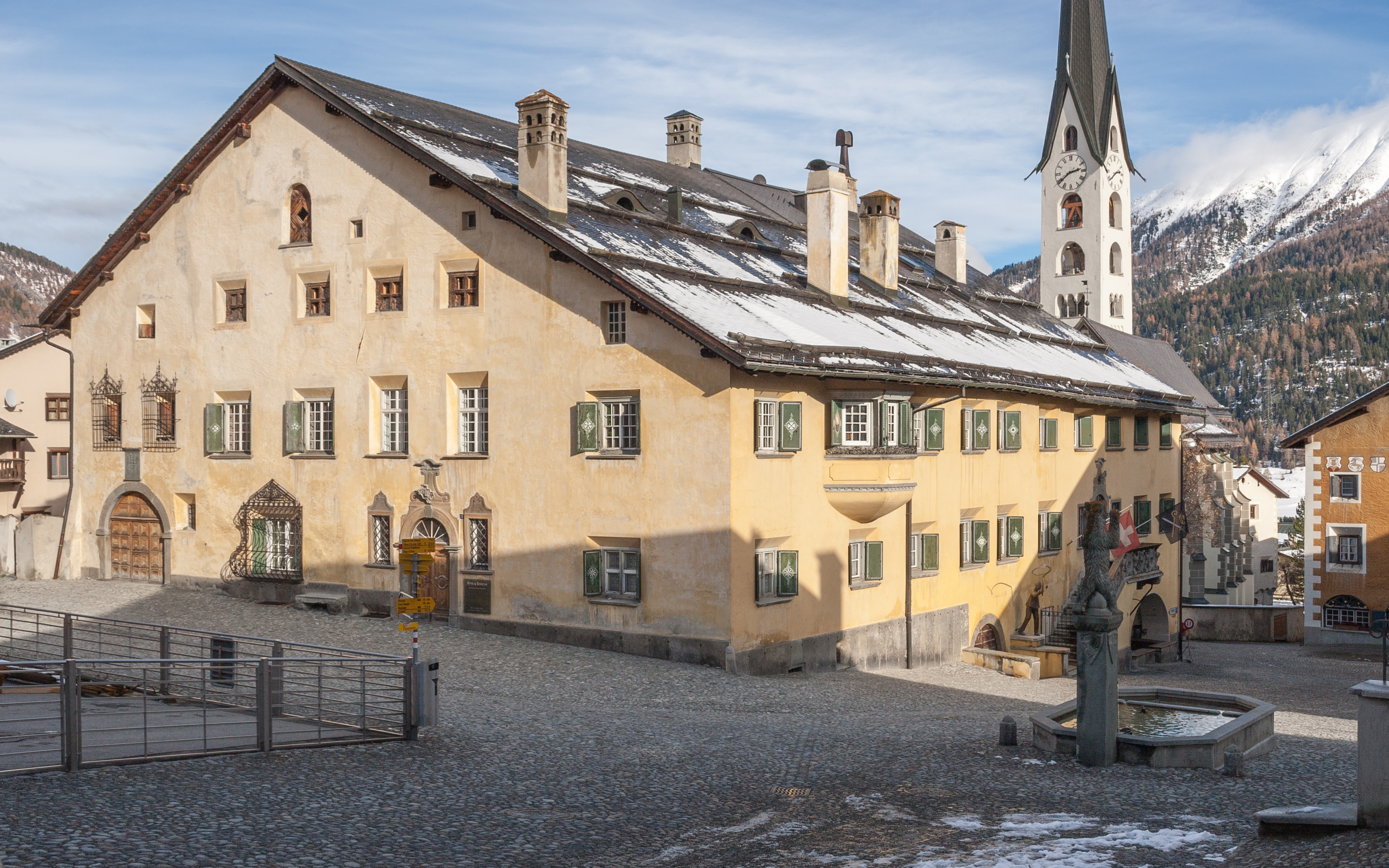
Chesa Planta

The Chaplutta S. Bastiaun and Chasa Pult are listed as Swiss heritage sites of national significance.

== Transportation ==
The municipality has a railway station, Zuoz, on the Bever–Scuol-Tarasp line. It has regular service to St. Moritz, Landquart, Scuol-Tarasp, and Pontresina.
