= S-chanf railway station =

Railway station in Switzerland

S-chanf
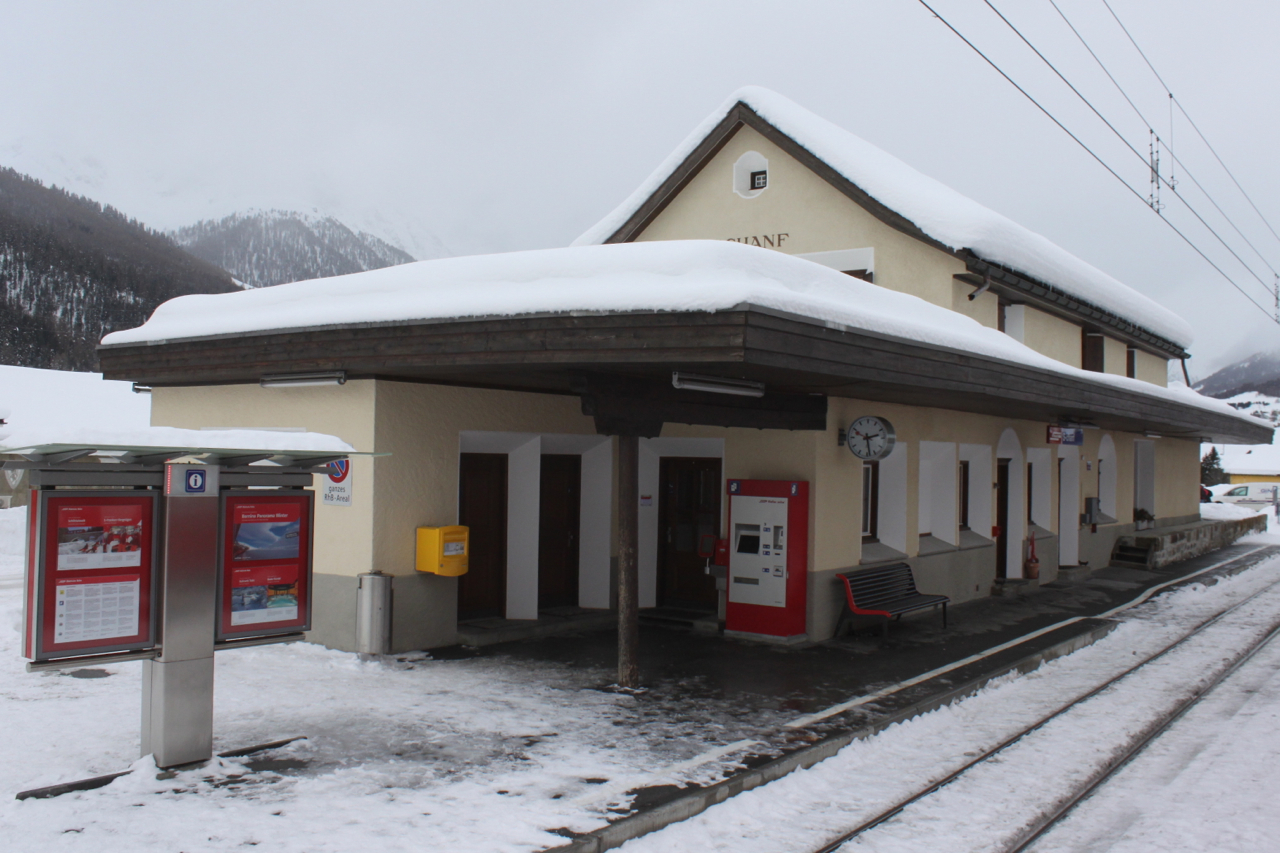
- The station in 2014

General information
- Location: Davos Chesas; S-chanf; Switzerland
- Coordinates: 46°36′43″N 9°58′55″E
- Elevation: 1,670 m (5,480 ft)
- Owner: Rhaetian Railway
- Line: Bever–Scuol-Tarasp line
- Distance: 106.0 km (65.9 mi) from Landquart
- Train operators: Rhaetian Railway
- Connections: Engadin Bus

Other information
- Fare zone: 42 (Engadin Mobil)

History
- Opened: 28 June 1913

Passengers
- 2018: 270 per weekday

Services
Preceding station	Rhaetian Railway	Following station
Zuoz towards St. Moritz	RE 3	Zernez towards Landquart
Zuoz towards Pontresina	R 15	Cinuos-chel-Brail towards Scuol-Tarasp
Location

S-chanf railway station is a railway station in the municipality of S-chanf, in the Swiss canton of Graubünden. It is located on the 1,000 mm (3 ft 3 3/8 in) metre gauge Bever–Scuol-Tarasp line of the Rhaetian Railway. Hourly services operate on this line.

== Services ==
As of the December 2023 timetable change, the following services stop at S-chanf:

- RegioExpress: hourly service between Landquart and St. Moritz.
- Regio: hourly service between Scuol-Tarasp and Pontresina.
