= Zernez railway station =

Railway station in Switzerland

Zernez
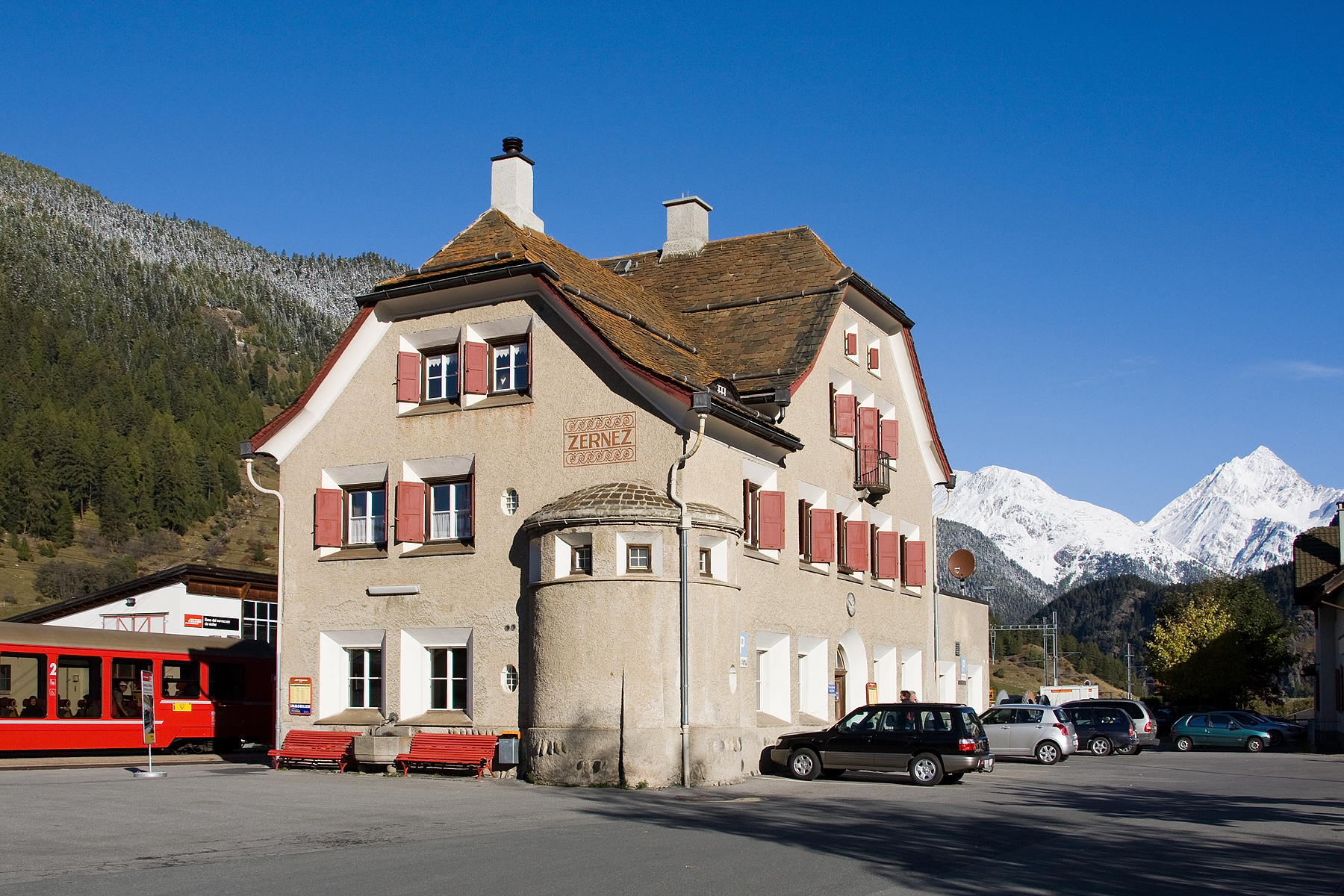
- The station building in 2008

General information
- Location: Zernez; Switzerland
- Coordinates: 46°41′52″N 10°05′24″E
- Elevation: 1,471 m (4,826 ft)
- Owner: Rhaetian Railway
- Line: Bever–Scuol-Tarasp line
- Distance: 120.4 km (74.8 mi) from Landquart
- Train operators: Rhaetian Railway
- Connections: PostAuto Schweiz

Construction
- Architect: Meinrad Lorenz (1913)

History
- Opened: 28 June 1913

Passengers
- 2018: 870 per weekday

Services
Preceding station	Rhaetian Railway	Following station
S-chanf towards St. Moritz	RE 3	Susch towards Landquart
Cinuos-chel-Brail towards Pontresina	R 15	Susch towards Scuol-Tarasp
Location

Zernez railway station is a railway station in the municipality of Zernez, in the Swiss canton of Graubünden. It is located on the 1,000 mm (3 ft 3 3/8 in) metre gauge Bever–Scuol-Tarasp line of the Rhaetian Railway. Hourly services operate on this line. It is an important station located on the northwestern edge of the village of Zernez at 1471 m. All trains that serve part or all of the Engadine line stop in Zernez and it is also connected by Postbus services over the Fuorn Pass and through the Val Müstair to Müstair, Santa Maria and Mals in Italy, where it connects in turn to the Merano–Mals railway to Merano and Bolzano. In summer, additional post buses run to Davos Platz. Freight transport also plays a major role in Zernez. Freight trains containing swap bodies regularly run to Zernez, from where they are transported by truck to the Val Müstair. In addition, much freight is shipped from the middle Engadine via Zernez.

Zernez station was completely rebuilt in 2010 and 2011. Among other things, the railway facilities were renewed, the platforms were raised and thus adapted for the disabled, a new covered island platform was built, the station building was rebuilt, the platform was roofed over and extended and a crossing loop was built on the Susch side. The island platform is connected by an underpass to the station building on platform 1. In addition, a new PostBus ramp was built, which allowed better transfer options between trains and postbuses. Similarly, a new 40-tonne swap-body crane was built and a new general freight loading centre was built to improve freight handling.

== Services ==
As of the December 2023 timetable change, the following services stop at Zernez:

- RegioExpress: hourly service between Landquart and St. Moritz.
- Regio: hourly service between Scuol-Tarasp and Pontresina.
