= La Punt Chamues-ch railway station =

Railway station in Graubünden, Switzerland

La Punt Chamues-ch
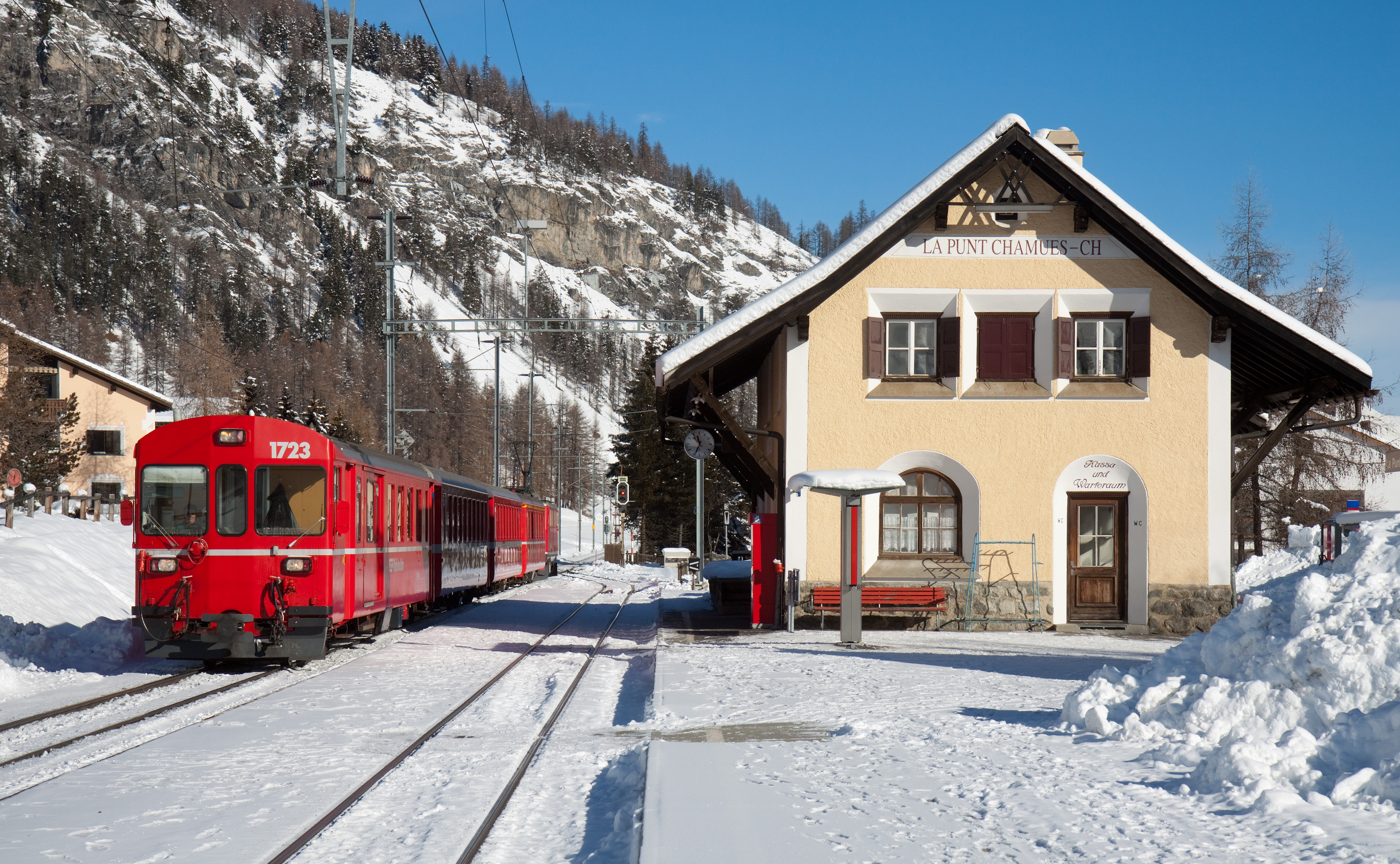
- Push-pull train at the station in 2010 with a BDt control car leading and a Ge 4/4 I pushing

General information
- Location: La Punt Chamues-ch; Switzerland
- Coordinates: 46°34′43″N 9°55′24″E
- Elevation: 1,699 m (5,574 ft)
- Owner: Rhaetian Railway
- Line: Bever–Scuol-Tarasp line
- Distance: 100.0 km (62.1 mi) from Landquart
- Train operators: Rhaetian Railway

Other information
- Fare zone: 41 (Engadin Mobil)

History
- Opened: 28 June 1913

Passengers
- 2018: 150 per weekday

Services
Preceding station	Rhaetian Railway	Following station
Bever towards Pontresina	R 15	Madulain towards Scuol-Tarasp
Location

La Punt Chamues-ch railway station is a railway station on the Bever–Scuol-Tarasp line in the Engadin valley of the eastern Swiss Alps in southeastern Switzerland, serving the municipality of La Punt Chamues-ch in the canton of Graubünden. Hourly services operate on this line.

== Services ==
As of the December 2023 timetable change, the following services stop at La Punt Chamues-ch:

- Regio: hourly service between Scuol-Tarasp and Pontresina.
