= Scaletta Pass =

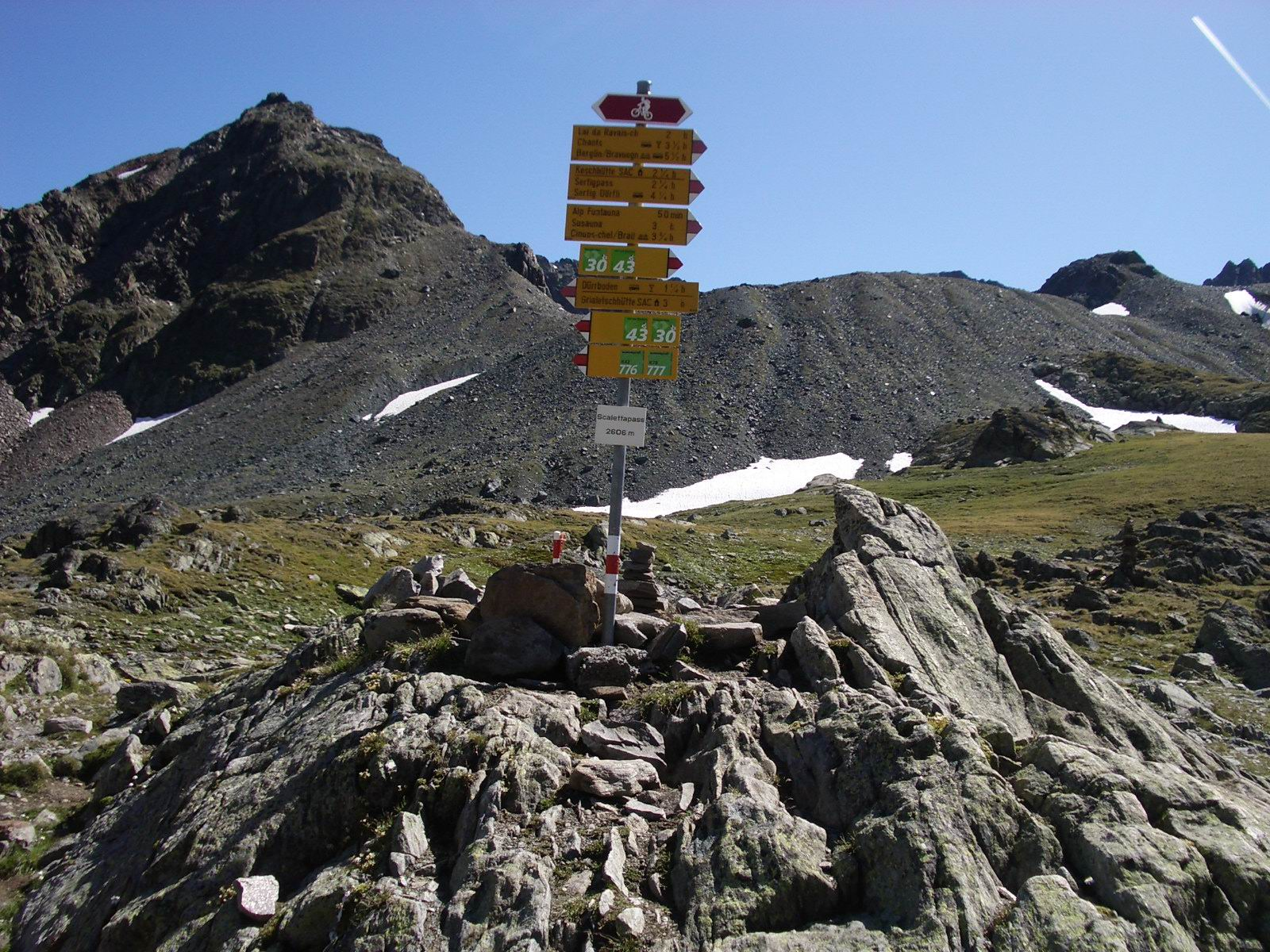
- Routes for hikers on the pass
- Interactive map of Scaletta Pass
- Elevation: 2,606 metres (8,550 ft)
- Traversed by: Path

Third Approach
- Location: Switzerland
- Range: Alps
- Coordinates: 46°41′N 9°55′E

Scaletta Pass (Romansh: Cuolm S-chaletta, German: Scalettapass) (el. 2606 m) is a mountain pass in the canton of Graubünden, Switzerland. It lies in the Albula Range of the Alps. The path from Dischma leads to Cinuos-chel in the Inn Valley. This means it is a crossing from the German spoken Davos area into the romansh spoken Engadin and additionally a crossing from the northerly drainage basin of the river Rhine flowing into the North Sea and the south side of the drainage divide, emptying its waters into the Black Sea via Inn (river) and Danube. During summer Scaletta pass combines several routes for hikers and Mountainbikers. Instead of just crossing the main pass you can also head via Val Funtauna towards Keschhütte and continue to Bergün. An annual Swiss Alpine Marathon crosses the pass as well.

== History ==
The Scaletta Pass (s-chaletta: romansch for „little stair“) lies on a medieval inner-alpine route from Chur via Davos to S-chanf in the Engadin valley, continuing via Chaschauna Pass to Veltlin. Ancient installations for horse traffic on Dürrboden on the northern side and Susauna on the south side as well as the historic hospice at La Chapella witness the former transport route. When the road across the Flüela pass was built between 1866 and 1868, the Scaletta Pass lost any economic importance it once had.

== See also ==
- List of mountain passes
- List of mountain passes in Switzerland
