= Lavin railway station =

Railway station in Switzerland

Lavin
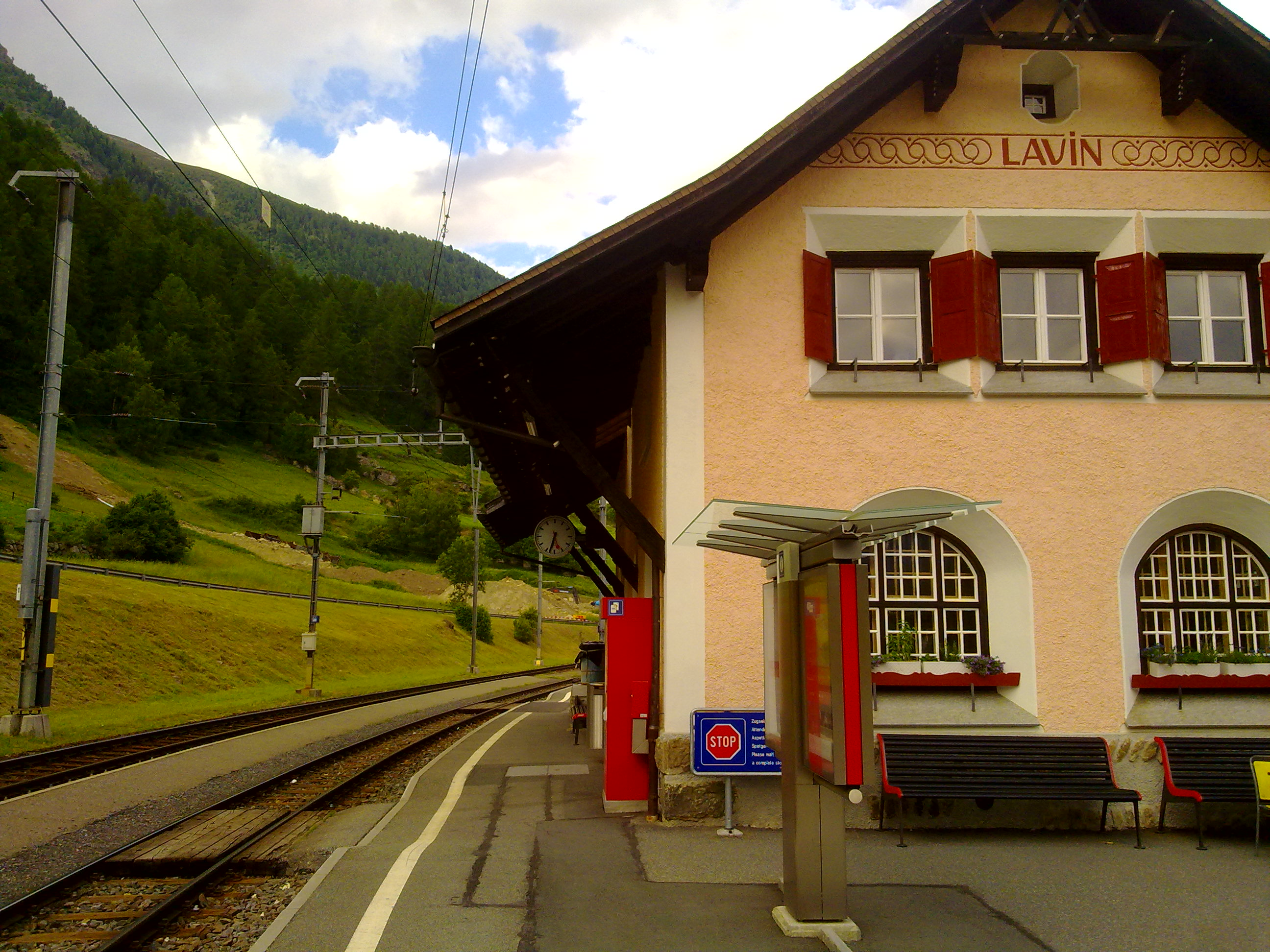
- The station building in 2013

General information
- Location: Zernez; Switzerland
- Coordinates: 46°46′10″N 10°06′39″E
- Elevation: 1,432 m (4,698 ft)
- Owner: Rhaetian Railway
- Line: Bever–Scuol-Tarasp line
- Distance: 130.1 km (80.8 mi) from Landquart
- Train operators: Rhaetian Railway

History
- Opened: 28 June 1913

Passengers
- 2018: 210 per weekday

Services
Preceding station	Rhaetian Railway	Following station
Sagliains towards Landquart	RE 4	Guarda towards Scuol-Tarasp
Sagliains towards Pontresina	R 15	Guarda towards Scuol-Tarasp
Location

Lavin railway station (German: Bahnhof Lavin) is a railway station in the municipality of Zernez, in the Swiss canton of Grisons. It is an intermediate stop on the 1,000 mm (3 ft 3 3/8 in) gauge Bever–Scuol-Tarasp line of the Rhaetian Railway.

== Services ==
As of the December 2023 timetable change, the following services stop at Lavin:

- RegioExpress: hourly service between Landquart and Scuol-Tarasp.
- Regio: hourly service between Pontresina and Scuol-Tarasp.
