= Madulain railway station =

Railway station in Switzerland

Madulain
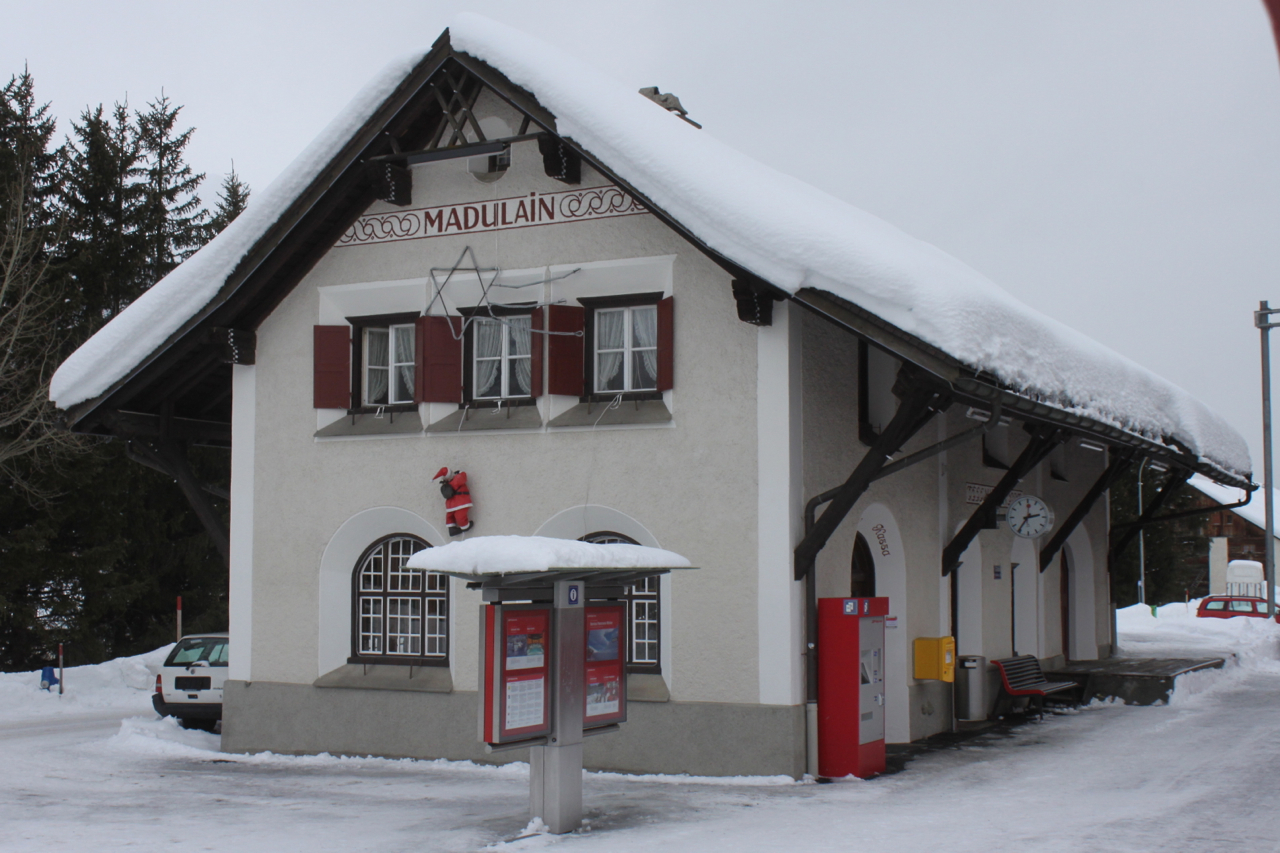
- The station building in 2014

General information
- Location: Madulain; Switzerland
- Coordinates: 46°35′13″N 9°56′18″E
- Elevation: 1,696 m (5,564 ft)
- Owner: Rhaetian Railway
- Line: Bever–Scuol-Tarasp line
- Distance: 101.5 km (63.1 mi) from Landquart
- Train operators: Rhaetian Railway
- Connections: Engadin Bus

Other information
- Fare zone: 41 (Engadin Mobil)

Passengers
- 2018: 130 per weekday

Services
Preceding station	Rhaetian Railway	Following station
La Punt Chamues-ch towards Pontresina	R 15	Zuoz towards Scuol-Tarasp
Location

Madulain railway station is a railway station in the municipality of Madulain, in the Swiss canton of Graubünden. It is located on the 1,000 mm (3 ft 3 3/8 in) metre gauge Bever–Scuol-Tarasp line of the Rhaetian Railway. Hourly services operate on this line.

== Services ==
As of the December 2023 timetable change, the following services stop at Madulain:

- Regio: hourly service between Scuol-Tarasp and Pontresina.
