= Zuoz railway station =

Railway station in Switzerland

Zuoz
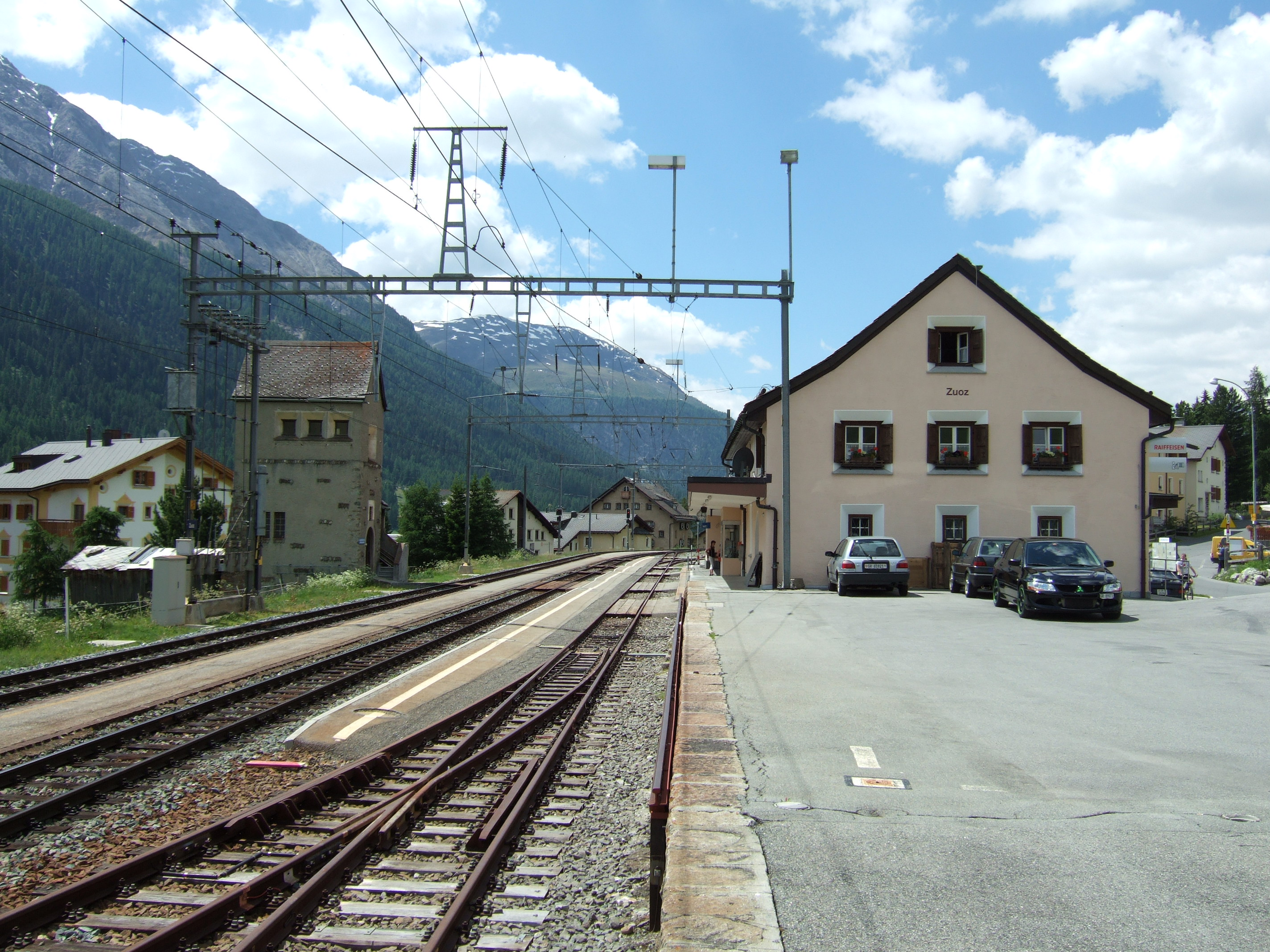
- The station in 2010, viewed in the direction of St Moritz

General information
- Location: Via Staziun; Zuoz; Switzerland
- Coordinates: 46°36′00″N 9°57′41″E
- Elevation: 1,691 m (5,548 ft)
- Owner: Rhaetian Railway
- Line: Bever–Scuol-Tarasp line
- Distance: 103.8 km (64.5 mi) from Landquart
- Train operators: Rhaetian Railway
- Connections: Engadin Bus

Other information
- Fare zone: 42 (Engadin Mobil)

History
- Opened: 28 June 1913

Passengers
- 2018: 610 per weekday

Services
Preceding station	Rhaetian Railway	Following station
Bever towards St. Moritz	RE 3	S-chanf towards Landquart
Madulain towards Pontresina	R 15	S-chanf towards Scuol-Tarasp
Location

Zuoz railway station is a railway station in the municipality of Zuoz, in the Swiss canton of Graubünden. It is located on the 1,000 mm (3 ft 3 3/8 in) metre gauge Bever–Scuol-Tarasp line of the Rhaetian Railway. Hourly services operate on this line.

== Services ==
As of the December 2023 timetable change, the following services stop at Zuoz:

- RegioExpress: hourly service between Landquart and St. Moritz.
- Regio: hourly service between Scuol-Tarasp and Pontresina.
