= Maloja Region =

Coordinates: 46°24′9″N 9°41′42″E

Maloja Region Region Maloja (German) Regione Maloja (Italian) Regiun Malögia (Romansh)
- District
- Country: Switzerland
- Canton: Grisons

Area
  - Total: 973.65 km^{2} (375.93 sq mi)

Population (2020)
  - Total: 18,294
  - Density: 18.789/km^{2} (48.664/sq mi)
- Time zone: UTC+1 (CET)
  - Summer (DST): UTC+2 (CEST)
- Municipalities: 12

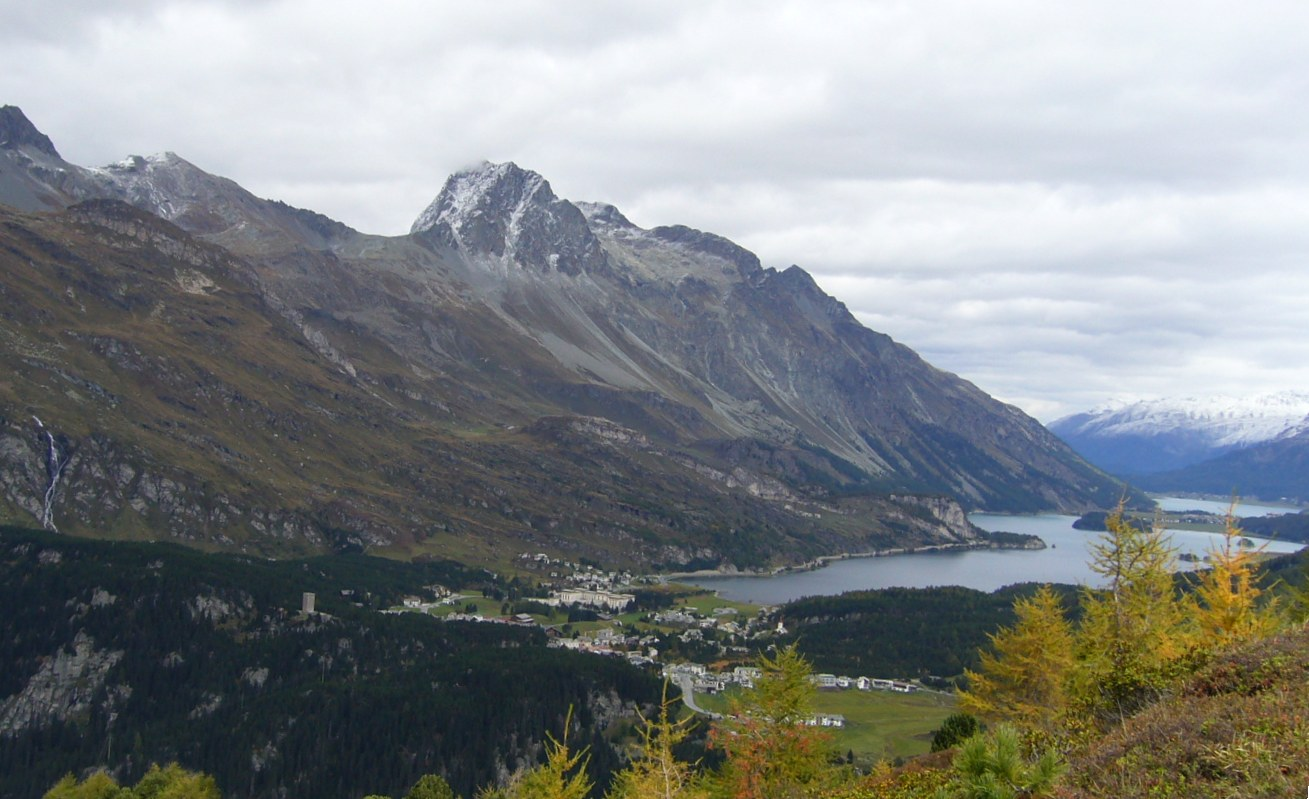
Maloja, View northeast towards Upper Engadin

Maloja Region is one of the eleven administrative districts in the canton of Grisons in Switzerland. It has an area of 973.65 square kilometers (375.93 sq mi) and a population of 18,294 (as of 31 December 2020). It was created on 1 January 2017 as part of a reorganization of the Canton.

Municipalities in the Maloja Region
Municipality	Population (31 December 2020)	Area (km^{2})
Bever	584	45.75
Celerina/Schlarigna	1,484	24.02
Madulain	206	16.28
Pontresina	2,178	118.2
La Punt Chamues-ch	686	63.28
Samedan	2,923	113.8
St. Moritz	4,945	28.69
S-chanf	697	138.04
Sils im Engadin/Segl	715	63.58
Silvaplana	1,121	44.77
Zuoz	1,199	65.79
Bregaglia	1,556	251.45
