= Cinuos-chel-Brail railway station =

Railway station in Graubünden, Switzerland

Cinuos-chel-Brail
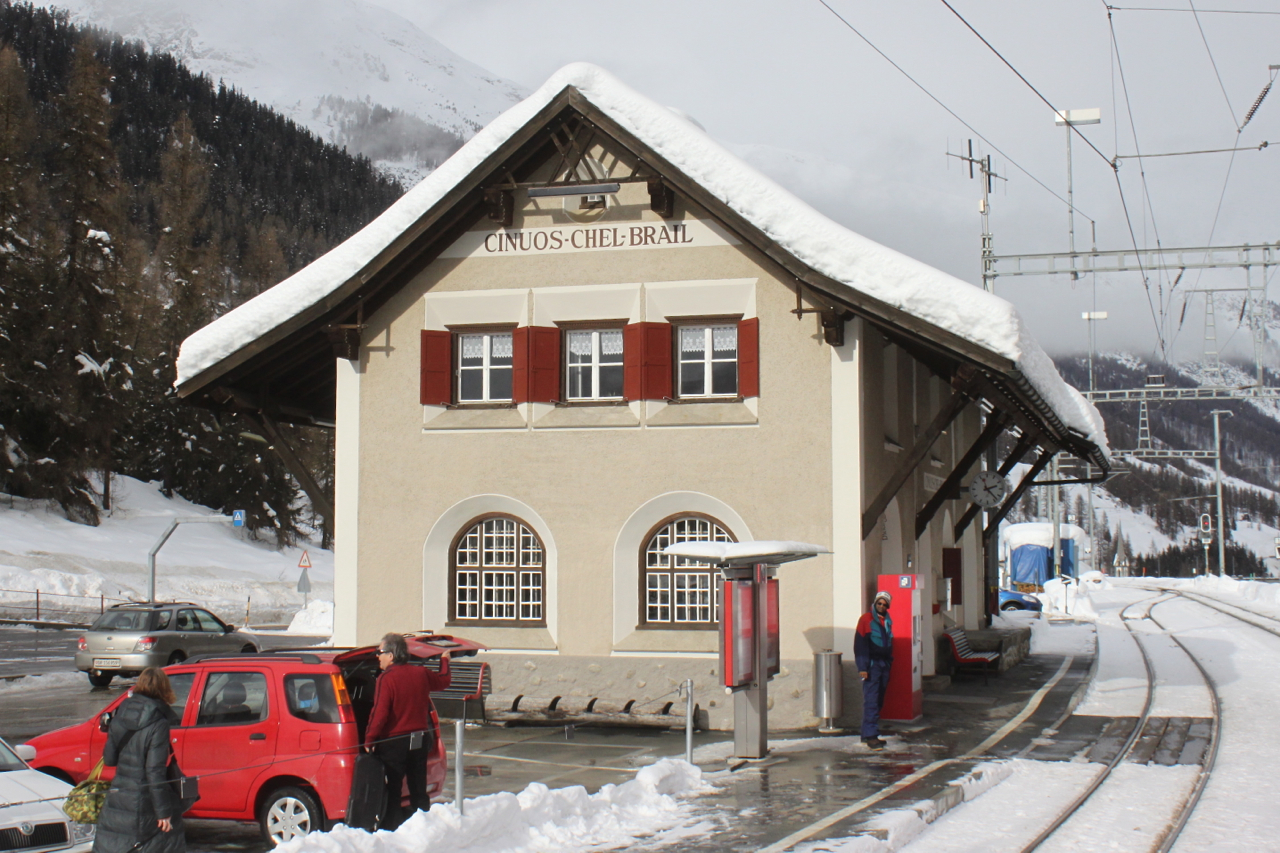
- The station building in 2014

General information
- Location: S-chanf; Switzerland
- Coordinates: 46°38′19″N 10°01′19″E
- Elevation: 1,628 m (5,341 ft)
- Owner: Rhaetian Railway
- Line: Bever–Scuol-Tarasp line
- Distance: 110.3 km (68.5 mi) from Landquart
- Train operators: Rhaetian Railway
- Connections: PostAuto Schweiz and Engadin Bus

Other information
- Fare zone: 43 (Engadin Mobil)

History
- Opened: 28 June 1913

Passengers
- 2018: 80 per weekday

Services
| Preceding station | Rhaetian Railway | Following station |
|---|---|---|
| S-chanf towards Pontresina | R 15 | Zernez towards Scuol-Tarasp |
Location

Cinuos-chel-Brail railway station is a railway station in the municipality of S-chanf, in the Swiss canton of Graubünden. It is located on the 1,000 mm (3 ft 3 3/8 in) metre gauge Bever–Scuol-Tarasp line of the Rhaetian Railway. Hourly services operate on this line.

== Services ==
As of the December 2023 timetable change, the following services stop at Cinuos-chel-Brail:

- Regio: hourly service between Scuol-Tarasp and Pontresina.
