= Ardez railway station =

Railway station in Switzerland

Ardez
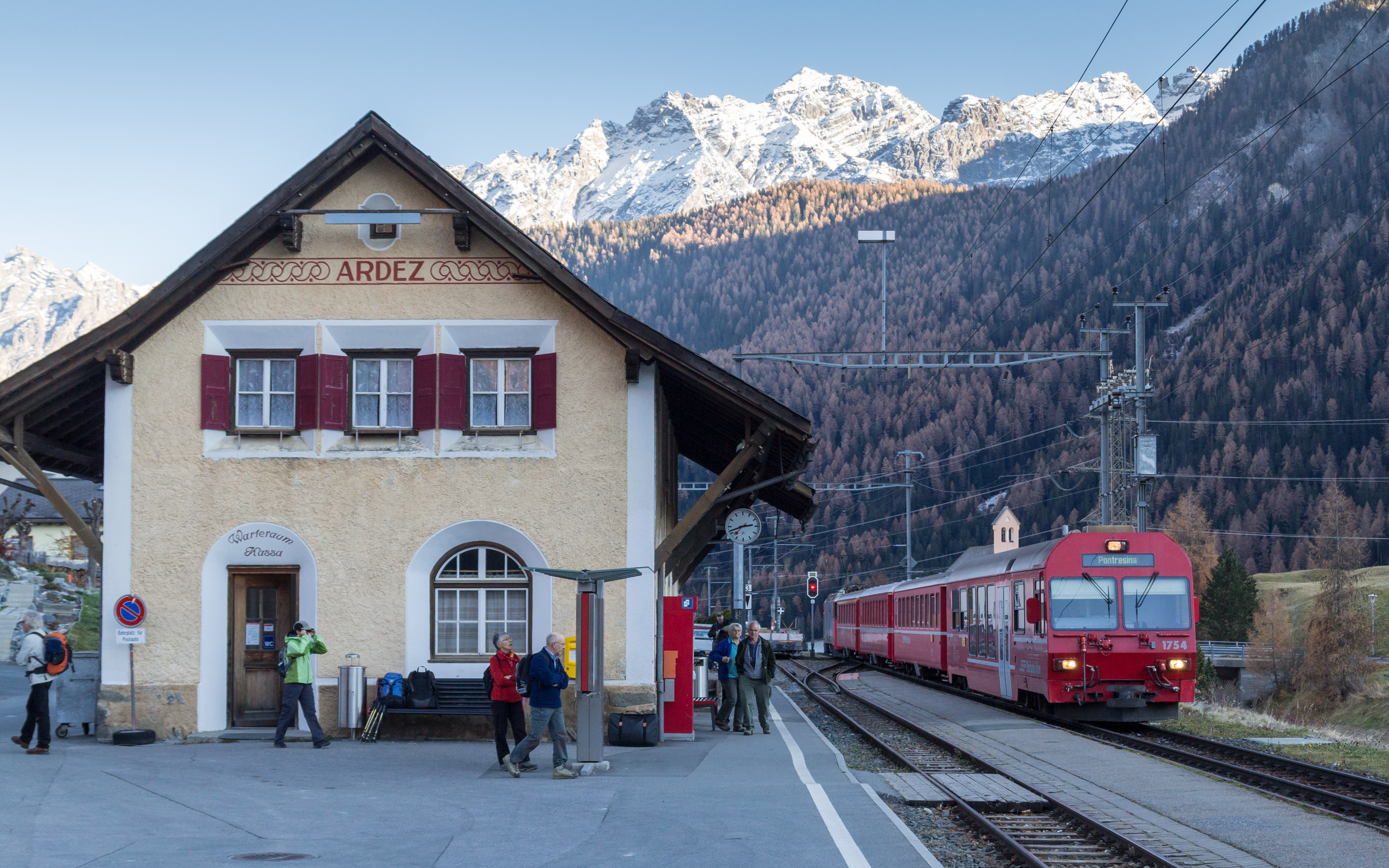
- Train at the station in 2011

General information
- Location: Scuol; Switzerland
- Coordinates: 46°46′25″N 10°12′04″E
- Elevation: 1,431 m (4,695 ft)
- Owner: Rhaetian Railway
- Line: Bever–Scuol-Tarasp
- Distance: 137.4 km (85.4 mi) from Landquart
- Train operators: Rhaetian Railway

Construction
- Architect: Meinrad Lorenz (1913)

History
- Opened: 28 June 1913

Passengers
- 2018: 250 per weekday

Services
Preceding station	Rhaetian Railway	Following station
Guarda towards Landquart	RE 4	Scuol-Tarasp Terminus
Guarda towards Pontresina	R 15	Ftan Baraigla towards Scuol-Tarasp
Location

Ardez railway station (German: Bahnhof Ardez) is a railway station in the village of Ardez, within the municipality of Scuol, in the Swiss canton of Grisons. It is an intermediate stop on the 1,000 mm (3 ft 3 3/8 in) gauge Bever–Scuol-Tarasp line of the Rhaetian Railway.

== Services ==
As of the December 2023 timetable change, the following services stop at Ardez:

- RegioExpress: hourly service between Landquart and Scuol-Tarasp.
- Regio: hourly service between Pontresina and Scuol-Tarasp.
