= Ftan Baraigla railway station =

Railway station in Switzerland

Ftan Baraigla
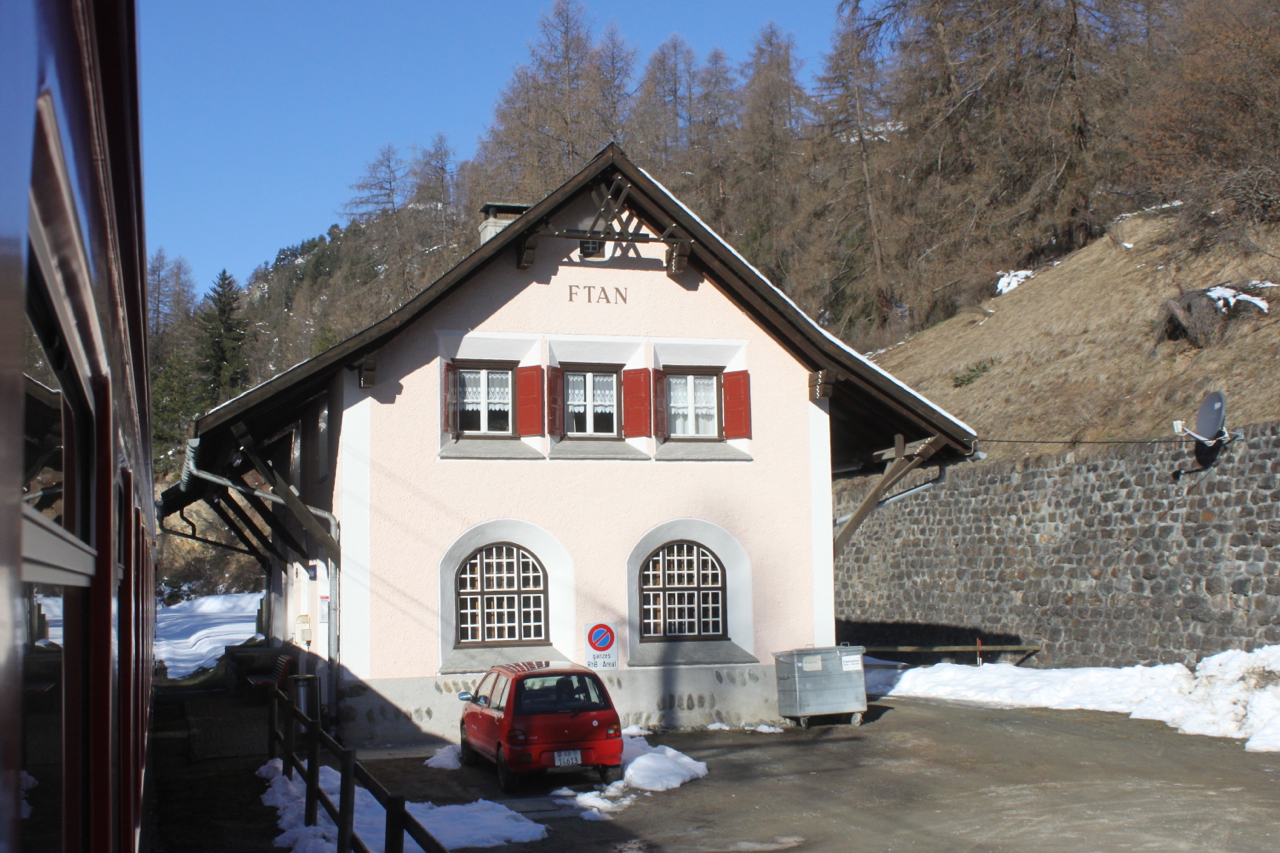
- Train at the station in 2014

General information
- Location: Scuol; Switzerland
- Coordinates: 46°47′16″N 10°15′29″E
- Elevation: 1,334 m (4,377 ft)
- Owner: Rhaetian Railway
- Line: Bever–Scuol-Tarasp
- Distance: 142.7 km (88.7 mi) from Landquart
- Train operators: Rhaetian Railway

Passengers
- 2018: 50 per weekday

Services
Preceding station	Rhaetian Railway	Following station
Ardez towards Pontresina	R 15	Scuol-Tarasp Terminus
Location

Ftan Baraigla railway station (German: Bahnhof Ftan Baraigla) is a railway station in the village of Ftan, within the municipality of Scuol, in the Swiss canton of Grisons. It is an intermediate stop on the 1,000 mm (3 ft 3 3/8 in) gauge Bever–Scuol-Tarasp line of the Rhaetian Railway.

== Services ==
As of the December 2023 timetable change, the following services stop at Ftan Baraigla:

- Regio: hourly service between Pontresina and Scuol-Tarasp.
