= Bever–Scuol-Tarasp railway =

Railway line in Switzerland

Bever–Scuol-Tarasp
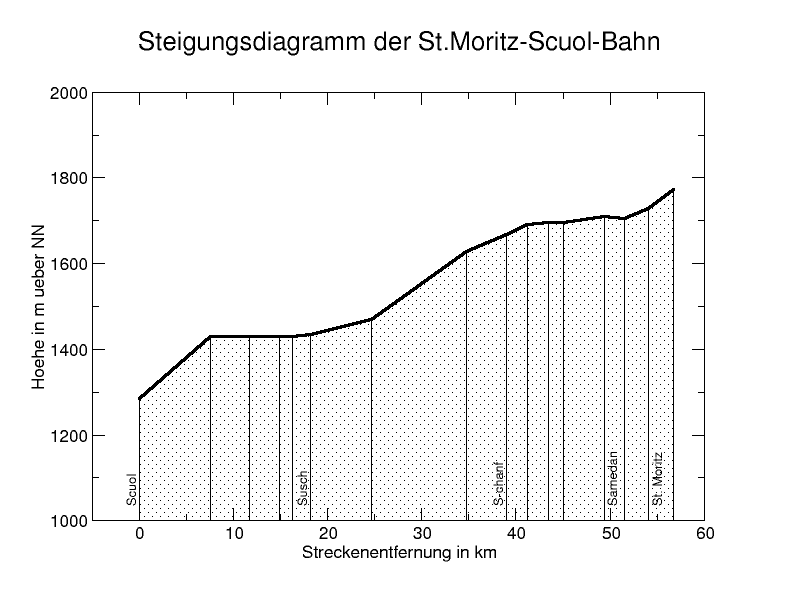

Overview
- Owner: Rhaetian Railway
- Line number: 910 and 960
- Termini: Bever; Scuol-Tarasp

Technical
- Line length: 49.41 km (30.70 mi)
- Number of tracks: Single track with Passing loops
- Track gauge: 1,000 mm (3 ft 3 3/8 in) metre gauge
- Electrification: 11 kV 16.7 Hz AC overhead catenary
- Maximum incline: 2.5%

The Bever–Scuol-Tarasp railway—also called the Engadinerbahn (Engadine Railway), Engadinerlinie (Engadine Line), Unterengadinerbahn (Lower Engadine Railway) or Unterengadinerlinie (Lower Engadine Line)—is a Swiss metre-gauge railway, which is operated by the Rhaetian Railway (Rhätischen Bahn; RhB) and connects the Lower Engadine with the Albula Railway. The Samedan–Pontresina railway is often also considered part of the line. Both lines are closely linked with each other. The Bever–Scuol-Tarasp railway is part of the RhB mainline network, so the kilometrage (chainage) has its zero point in Landquart.

== History ==
After the construction of the Albula Railway the canton of Grisons and the federal military authorities, among others, were very interested in a railway line through the Engadine. Originally this line was intended only as a branch line, but due to its high popularity it was given a higher priority. The line was finally commissioned by the Rhaetian Railway on 27 July 1903. Friedrich Hennings, who had already designed the Albula Railway, had been working on a project for a technically and financially feasible line through the Engadine. After the preparation of designs for this project, the Loste office in Paris, together with senior engineer Peter Saluz, took over the detailed planning, which was based on the plans of Hennings. In 1907, a project was finally presented, which provided for a 49.5-kilometre (30.8 mi) line with a total of 17 tunnels and 55 major bridges. The engineering structures on the line now required specialists with experience. So Hans Studer, who was already worked on the Wiesen Viaduct, was commissioned as site supervisor for the Zernez–Scuol section. An experienced construction technician Jakob G. Zollinger took over responsibility on the Zernez–Scuol section.

=== Construction ===
Construction began on the whole line in the spring of 1909. Originally it was to be finished in the summer of 1912, but the engineers and workers encountered unexpected tunneling problems between Guarda and Scuol. While Bever and Guarda were already busy with the construction of track and superstructure in the spring of 1912, the miners between Guarda and Scuol had to deal with unusual rock pressures, loose rock layers and the ingress of water during the tunnel construction. Finally, the breakthrough of the longest tunnels at Magnacun (1,909 m [6,263 ft]) and Tasna (2,350 m [7,710 ft]) took place in June/July 1912. After that, the construction workers succeeded in completing the walling and the full breakthrough was completed in April 1913. The line was officially opened on 28/29 June 1913.

==== Construction accident 1911 ====
On 29 August 1911, a 30 m (98 ft)-high wood frame collapsed on itself at the Val Mela viaduct between Cinuos-chel and Brail causing the death of twelve Italian construction workers. In memory of this misfortune, the cause of which was never established, there is a plaque on the portal of the entrance of the Brail 1 Tunnel, which was last restored in 2003.

=== Electrification ===
As a result of the BLS's electrical test operation on the Spiez–Frutigen line, the Rhaetian Railway became interested in the new traction technology using single-phase alternating current. The Rhaetian Railway thus decided to use the Bever–Scuol line, which was still under construction, as a test track for single-phase alternating current. The Rhaetian Railway commissioned its energy supply from the Brusio power station. The Brusio power station had to ensure the supply of electricity from the Val Poschiavo via the Bernina Pass to a substation in Bever, which was specially erected for the transformation of the power to the required voltage of 11 kV/16 2/3 Hz. Thus, the Rhaetian Railway was able to operate the Lower Engadine line electrically from its opening.

=== Accidents ===
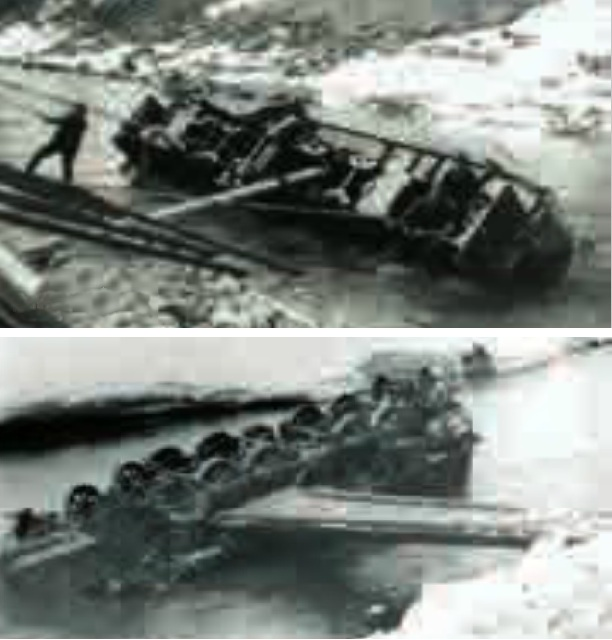
Salvage after the accident at Zernez on 19 March 1937.

A train crashed onto a fallen boulder on the approach to the Magnacun Tunnel between Guarda and Ardez on 22 March 1927. The Ge 2/4 206 was forced against the edge of the wall of the tunnel portal. The locomotive driver died, two passengers were severely injured and seven were slightly injured.

On 19 March 1937, the last evening train between Zernez and Susch ran into a snow drift. Locomotive Ge 4/6 391 derailed and crashed across the road into the Inn, but the carriages stopped on the track. The engine driver died and a travelling Bahnmeister (an official in charge local of track maintenance) was badly injured, but the passengers escaped injury. The locomotive could not be recovered for more than two months.

A strange accident occurred on 30 April 2012, when late in the evening a train on the Scuol-Tarasp–Klosters route collided with a brown bear called M13 at Ftan Baraigla station. No major injuries on the animal could be detected.

== Route ==
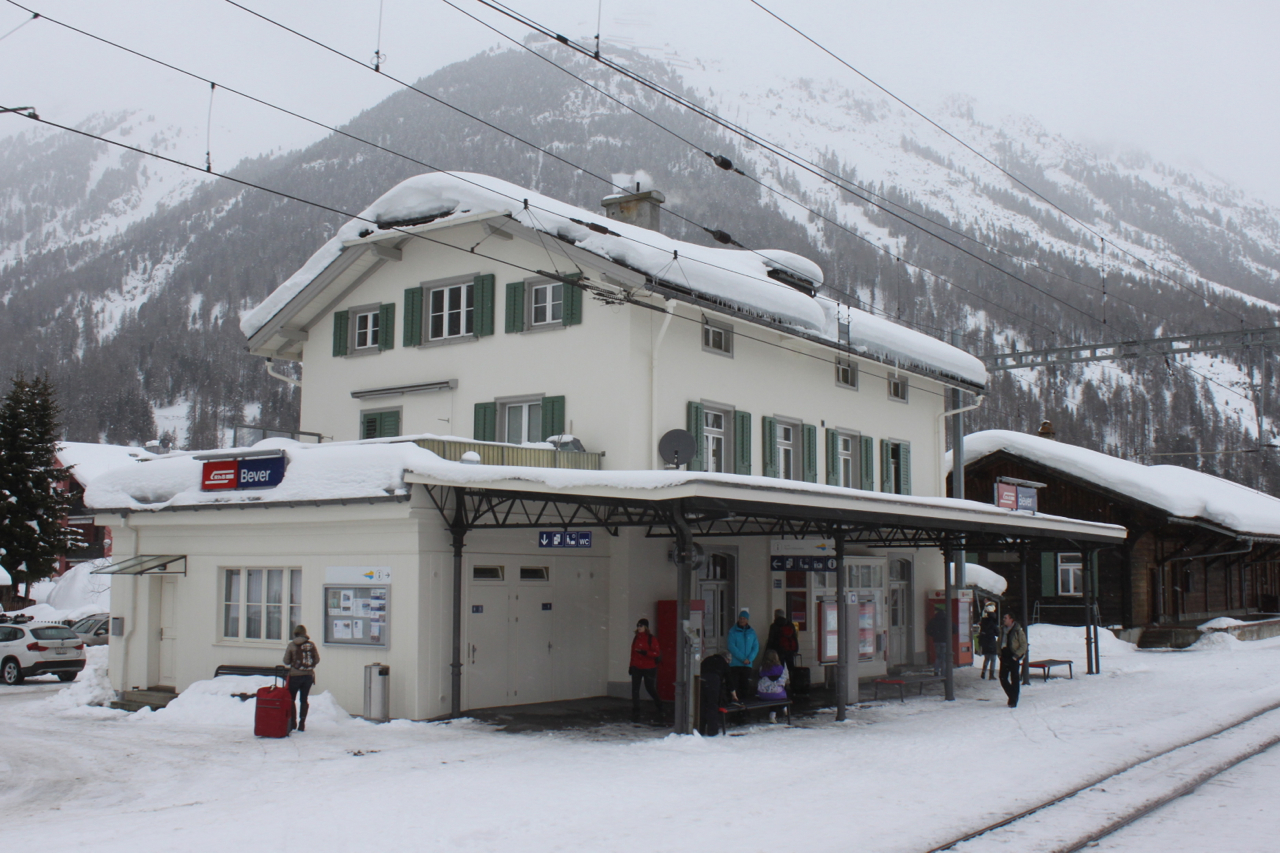
Bever station in February 2014

The so-called Lower Engadine line starts at the Bever junction station, where it branches off from the Albula Railway from Samedan and St. Moritz to the south and Filisur, Thusis and Chur to the north. The line now runs on the still wide left side of the valley of the Upper Engadine at a 2.0% gradient through the stations of La Punt Chamues-ch, Madulain, Zuoz und S-chanf to Cinuos-chel-Brail. The halt of S-chanf Marathon lies at 107.4 km (66.7 mi) between S-chanf and Cinuos-chel-Brail; this is served only by selected trains for sporting events in the winter and summer. After Cinuos-chel-Brail station, the line passes over the Inn on the famous 113 m (371 ft) Inn viaduct to the right (southern) side of the valley and then runs over several structures and tunnels and through the Carolina crossing loop to Zernez. The line descends from the Upper to the Lower Engadine on a large loop on the approach to Zernez. After Zernez, the line changes to the left (northern) side of the valley on a large steel bridge and then runs on constant gradient of 2.0% through several small tunnels to Susch. Shortly after Susch station, a connecting tunnel (Sasslatsch II, 277 m [909 ft]) branches off the line into the Vereina Tunnel. The Lower Engadine line continues along the left side of the valley and arrives at Sagliains and the north portal of the Vereina Tunnel. The station is both a car loading station for the car shuttle train through the Vereina tunnel and an interchange station for passenger trains. An exit has not been built for passengers to reach the public street.

After Sagliains, the line continues through the stations of Lavin, Guarda, Ardez and Ftan, as well as through several smaller tunnels, the long Tasna and Magnacun tunnels and several viaducts to Scuol-Tarasp.

== Railway stations ==
=== Bever ===
Bever station is at the starting point of the Engadine line at its junction with the Albula Railway (Chur–St. Moritz). It is located to the southwest of the village of Bever at 1,708 m (5,604 ft) above sea level. The station is served only by the passenger trains that operate on the Engadine line. The hourly Chur–St. Moritz Regional Express does not normally stop in Bever. Some early morning and late evening regional services on the Chur–St. Moritz route do stop.

=== Zernez ===
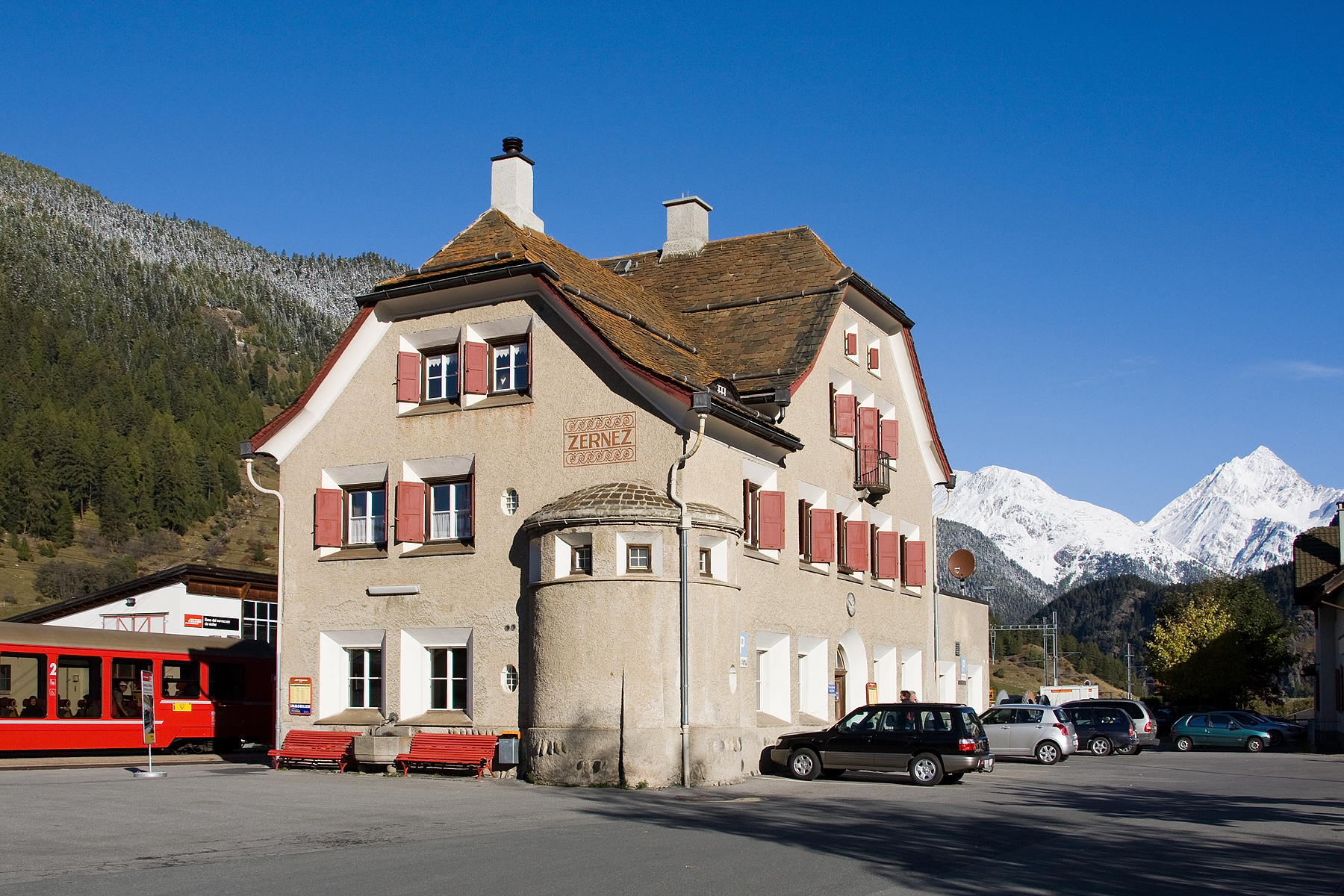
Zernez station

Zernez is an important station located on the northwestern edge of the village of Zernez at 1,471 m (4,826 ft). All trains that serve part or all of the Engadine line stop in Zernez and it is also connected by Postbus services over the Fuorn Pass and through the Val Müstair to Müstair, Santa Maria and Mals in Italy, where it connects in turn to the Merano–Mals railway to Merano and Bolzano. In summer, additional post buses run to Davos Platz. Freight transport also plays a major role in Zernez. Freight trains containing swap bodies regularly run to Zernez, from where they are transported by truck to the Val Müstair. In addition, much freight is shipped from the middle Engadine via Zernez.

Zernez station was completely rebuilt in 2010 and 2011. Among other things, the railway facilities were renewed, the platforms were raised and thus adapted for the disabled, a new covered island platform was built, the station building was rebuilt, the platform was roofed over and extended and a crossing loop was built on the Susch side. The island platform is connected by an underpass to the station building on platform 1. In addition, a new PostBus ramp was built, which allowed better transfer options between trains and postbuses. Similarly, a new 40-tonne swap-body crane was built and a new general freight loading centre was built to improve freight handling.

=== Sagliains ===
Sagliains station is located at 128.7 km (80.0 mi) at 1,432 m (4,698 ft) at the exit from the Sagliains valley between the villages and stations of Susch and Lavin in the Lower Engadine. It was built on material removed during the construction of the Vereina Tunnel. Sagliains station was opened with the Vereina tunnel in November 1999. Its main business is the operation of the Vereina car shuttle train. The car loading station is equipped with two loading tracks next to a loading ramp, which stretches along the valley slope. It has a direct connection to the main road through a car tunnel and a covered gallery, which serves, among other things, the waiting road vehicles and has offices for cashiers. There is also a service building with a self-service kiosk. In addition to the transport of cars, Sagliains station also serves as an interchange station between the Scuol-Tarasp–Pontresina regional services and the Scuol-Tarasp–Landquart–Chur–Disentis regional express services. As an interchange station, it only has an island platform without access from the outside. Thus, it is not normally possible to use this station for embarking and disembarking, except for changing trains.

=== Scuol-Tarasp ===
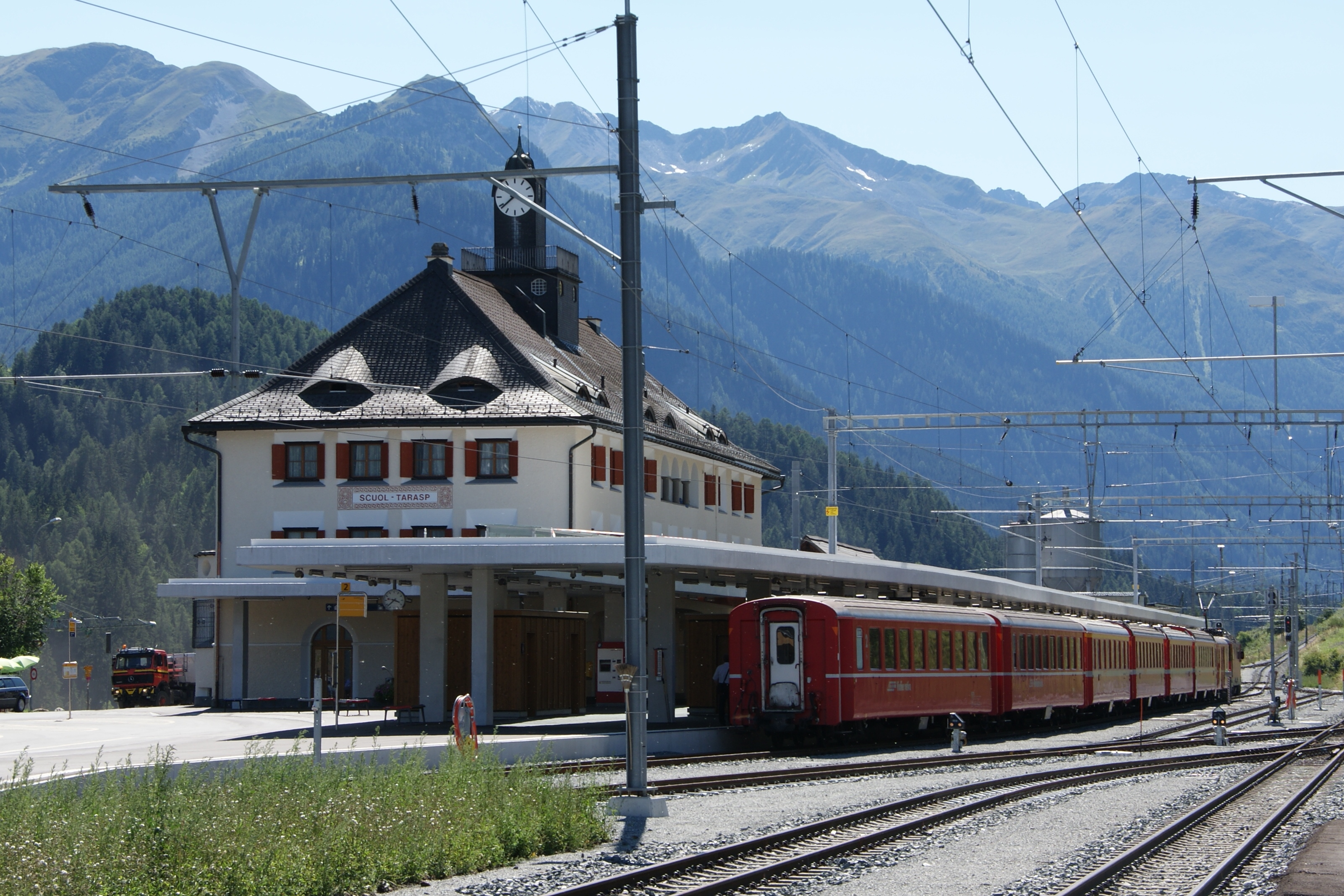
Train departing from Scuol-Tarasp station

Scuol-Tarasp station is located on the western edge of the village of Scuol at an altitude of 1,287 m (4,222 ft) in the Lower Engadine. The station is named after the neighbouring village of Scuol and the small town of Tarasp. The station was completely rebuilt and renovated in 2009. Since then, a Postbus stop has been located on the right side of the station building; this is the starting point for Postbus routes in the Lower Engadine. In addition, an island platform was built with platform track 1 as a dead-end track and track 2 as a through track. This allows direct access to the trains and platform at ground level. Likewise, the freight handling facilities were renewed and rebuilt. Scuol-Tarasp is the terminus or starting point for the Scuol-Tarasp–Zernez–Samedan–Pontresina regional service and for the Scuol-Tarasp–Landquart–Chur–Disentis Regional-Express service. Regular bus routes to Ftan, Tarasp, Samnaun, Martina, Sent, S-charl and Val Sinestra start at the station. In addition, the local school bus stops at the station. The cable car to Motta Naluns begins next to the station. Every week, up to five freight trains run daily from Landquart to Scuol-Tarasp. Oil, mail, cement and garbage are the main freight handled at the station.

== Operations ==
=== Passengers ===
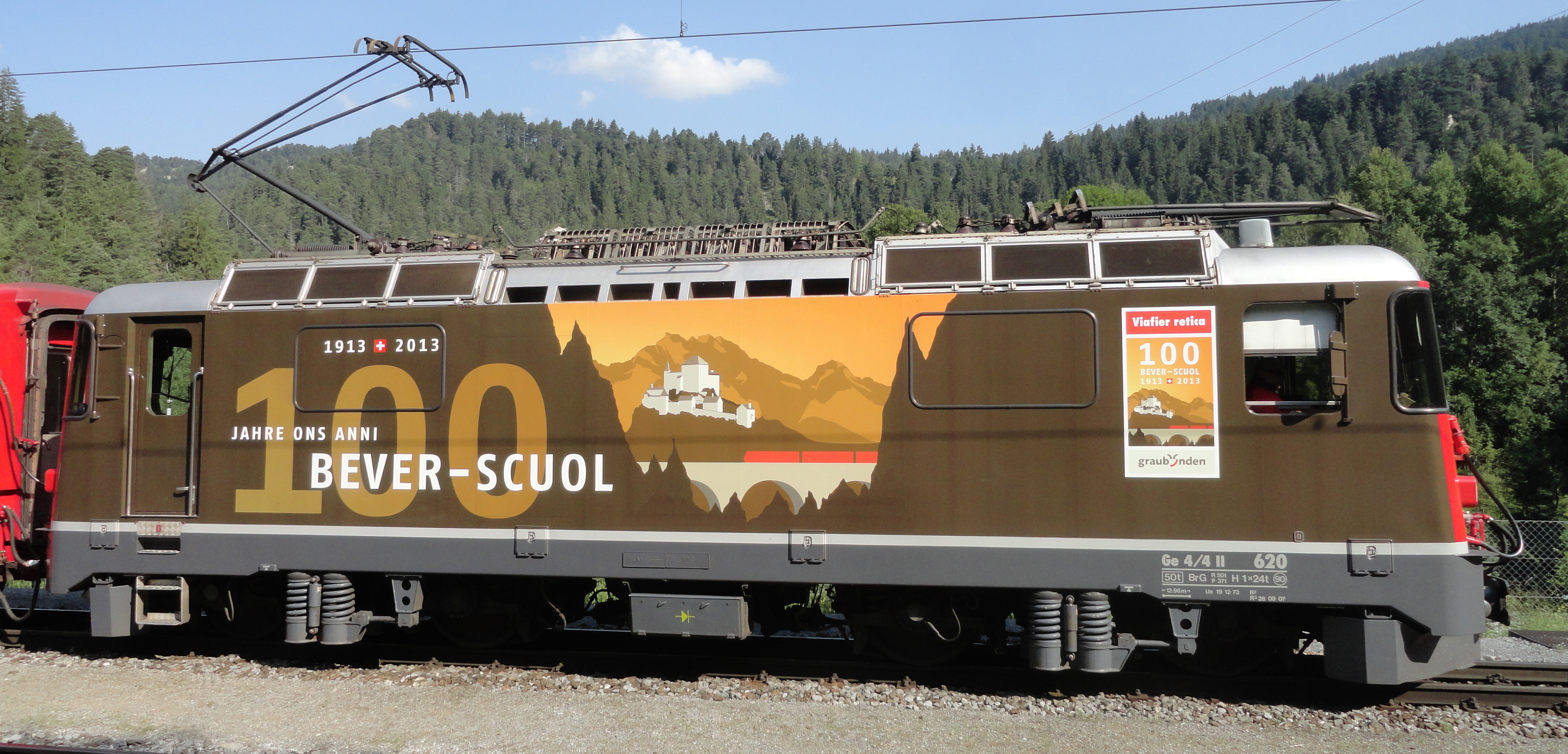
Locomotive Ge 4/4 II marking the 100th anniversary

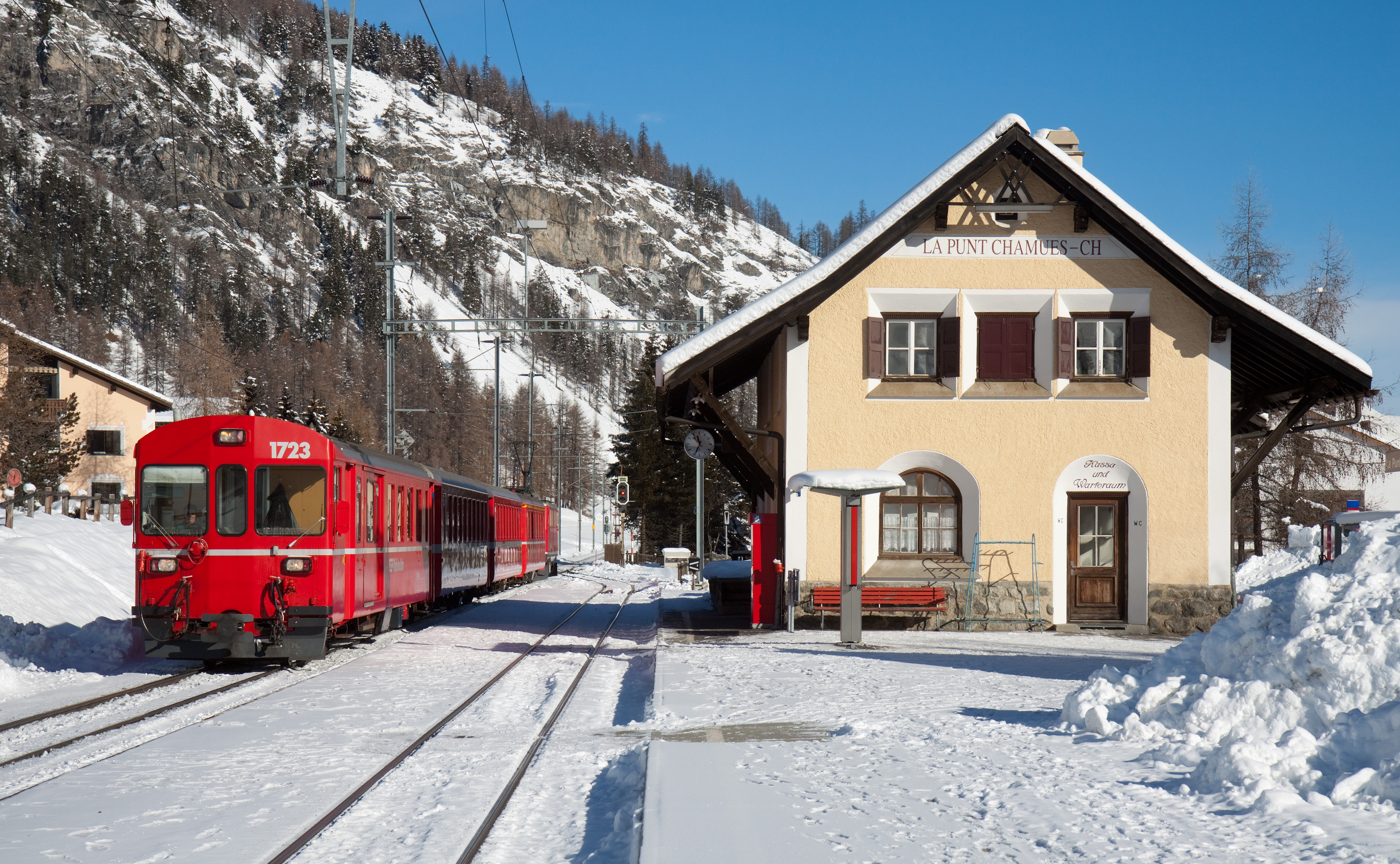
Push-pull train BDt 1723 and Ge 4/4 I in La Punt Chamues-ch

The line is served by hourly Pontresina–Samedan–Bever–Zernez–Scuol-Tarasp regional trains. These trains almost always consist of a Ge 4/4 II, an EW I 1st class and two EW I 2nd class cars, a push-pull WS cycle wagon (summer only) and a Neva Retica BDt control car. The Sagliains–Scuol-Tarasp section is also served by hourly Disentis–Landquart–Scuol-Tarasp regional trains. They usually consist of a Ge 4/4 II, an EW II or an EW IV 1st class and several 2nd-class passenger cars. The section between the Vereina tunnel and Bever is also served by Regional-Express services at two-hour intervals in the middle of the day, which mainly serve the important tourist connection from the Grisons lowland into the Engadine.

=== Freight ===
Freight transport also plays an important role over the whole Engadine line. Several freight trains run regularly to Scuol-Tarasp on weekdays and a freight train runs from Landquart to Samedan via Zernez almost every two hours. In addition, there are regular freight train movements to Zernez. Since 1999, the Vereina route via Zernez, Vereina and Klosters to Landquart has been faster than the route via the Albula line to Landquart, so many freight trains now run through the Vereina tunnel into the Engadine.

== Projected connection to South Tyrol/Italy ==
The old idea of a Fuorn Pass railway that would connect the Engadine with the Vinschgau in the South Tyrol, experienced a new upswing after the reopening of the Merano–Mals railway (Vinschgaubahn) in 2005. As part of an EU-funded interregional project, various possible routes were developed and examined in more detail. The results of the studies were presented at a 2013 meeting; the funding requirement was estimated at around €1 billion, depending on the route chosen.
