= Scuol-Tarasp railway station =

Railway station in Switzerland

Scuol-Tarasp
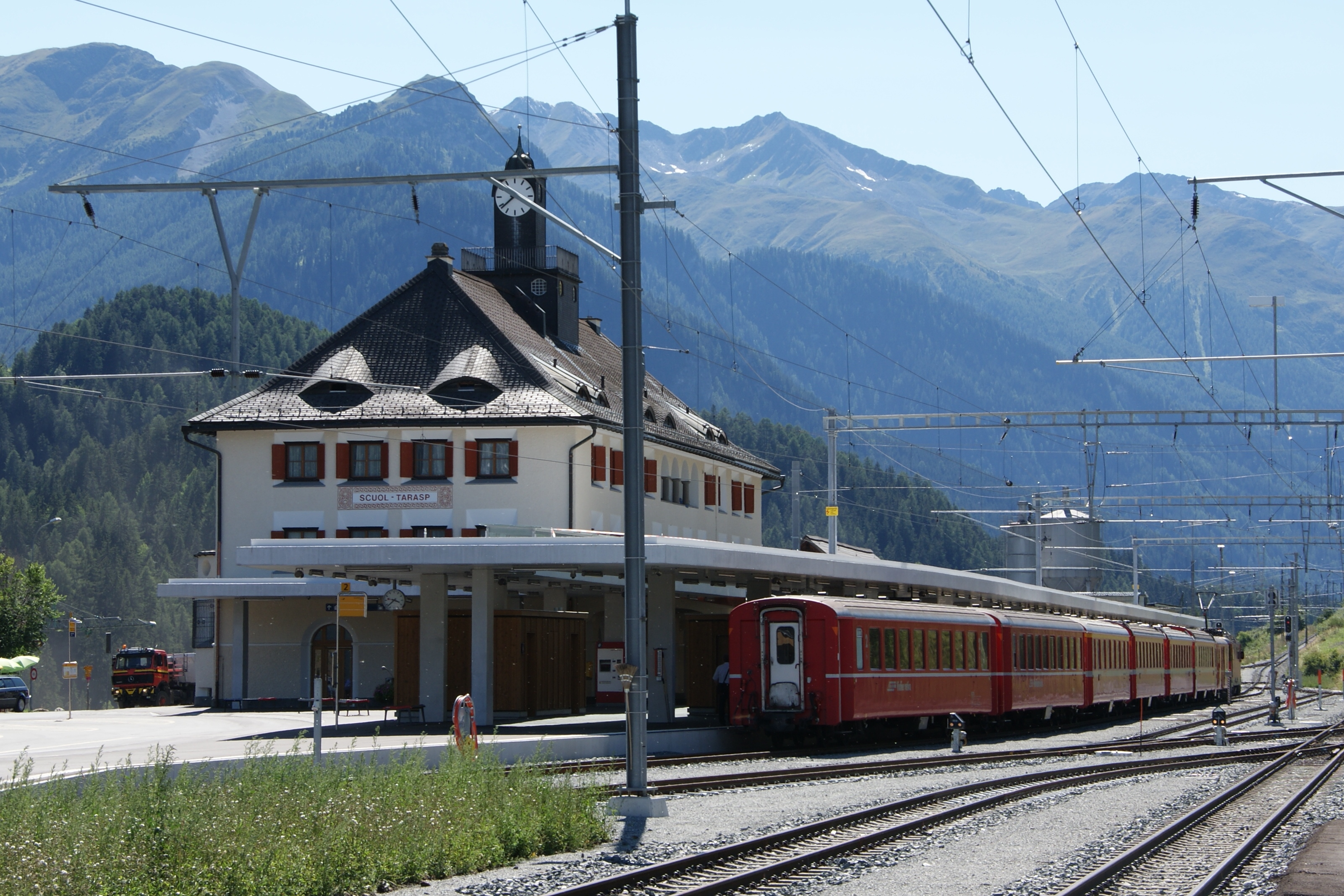
- Train at the station in 2010

General information
- Location: Scuol; Switzerland
- Coordinates: 46°47′38″N 10°17′10″E
- Elevation: 1,287 m (4,222 ft)
- Owner: Rhaetian Railway
- Line: Bever–Scuol-Tarasp
- Distance: 145.0 km (90.1 mi) from Landquart
- Platforms: 1
- Train operators: Rhaetian Railway
- Connections: PostAuto Schweiz buses

Construction
- Architect: Meinrad Lorenz (1913)

History
- Opened: 28 June 1913

Passengers
- 2018: 1,400 per weekday

Services
| Preceding station | Rhaetian Railway | Following station |
|---|---|---|
| Ardez towards Landquart | RE 4 | Terminus |
| Ftan Baraigla towards Pontresina | R 15 | Terminus |
Location

Scuol-Tarasp railway station is the northern terminus of the Bever–Scuol-Tarasp railway. It is located on the western edge of the village of Scuol at an altitude of 1287 m in the Lower Engadine. The station is named after the neighbouring village of Scuol and the small town of Tarasp.

Scuol-Tarasp station was completely rebuilt and renovated in 2009. Since then, a Postbus stop has been located on the right side of the station building; this is the starting point for Postbus routes in the Lower Engadine. In addition, an island platform was built with platform track 1 as a dead-end track and track 2 as a through track. This allows direct access to the trains and platform at ground level. Platform 1 is the only platform in use for passenger services. Likewise, the freight handling facilities were renewed and rebuilt.

Scuol-Tarasp is the terminus or starting point for the Scuol-Tarasp–Zernez–Samedan–Pontresina regional service and for the Scuol-Tarasp–Landquart RegioExpress service, both running hourly. Regular bus routes to Ftan, Tarasp, Samnaun, Martina, Sent, S-charl and Val Sinestra start at the station. In addition, the local school bus stops at the station. The cable car to Motta Naluns begins next to the station. Every week, up to five freight trains run daily from Landquart to Scuol-Tarasp. Oil, mail, cement and garbage are the main freight handled at the station.

== Services ==
As of the December 2023 timetable change, the following services stop at Scuol-Tarasp:

- RegioExpress: hourly service to Landquart.
- Regio: hourly service to Pontresina.

== See also ==
- Rail transport in Switzerland
