= Domat/Ems railway station =

Swiss railway station

Domat/Ems
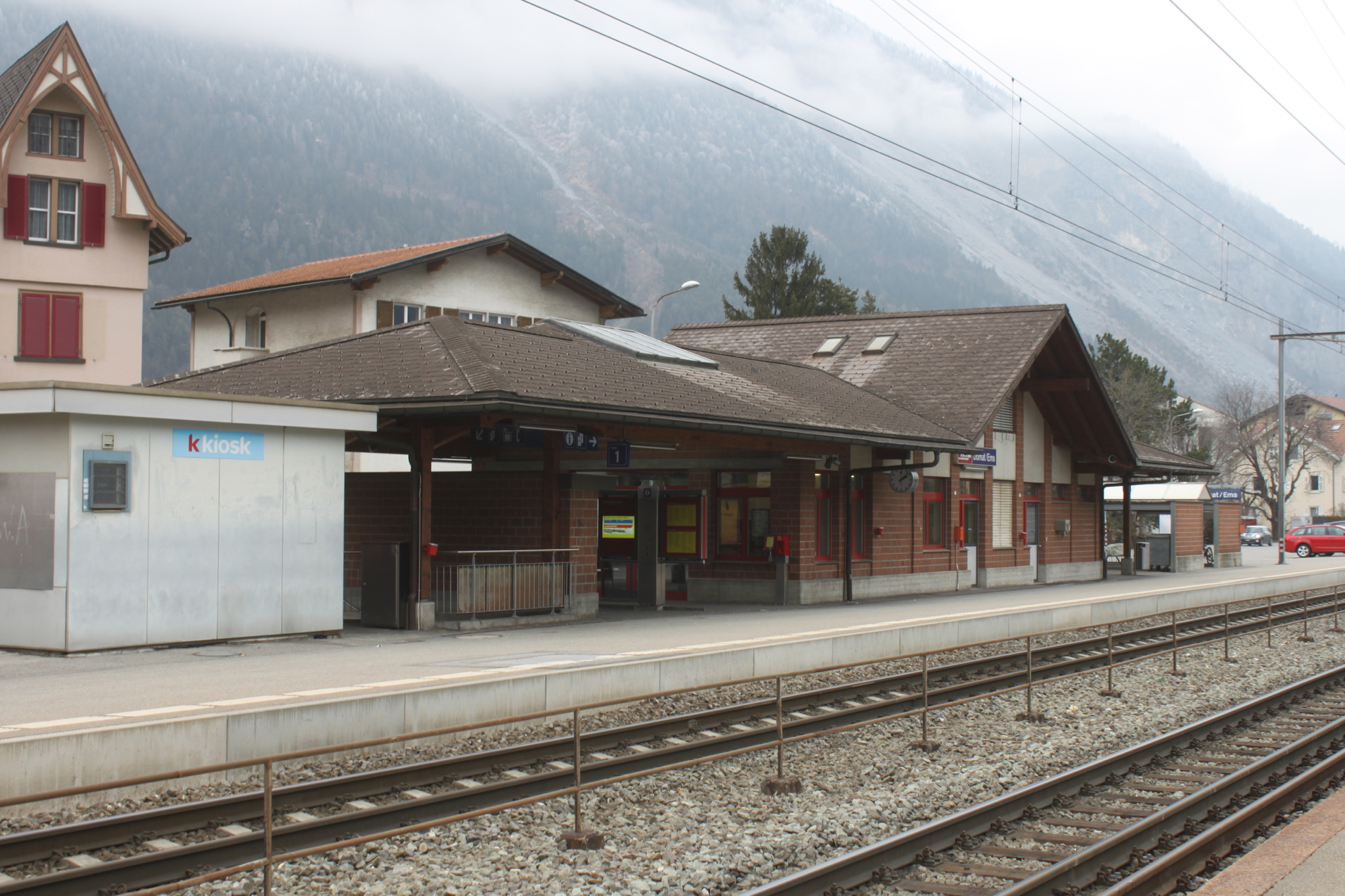
- The station building in 2015

General information
- Location: Domat/Ems; Switzerland
- Coordinates: 46°49′59″N 9°27′11″E
- Elevation: 581 m (1,906 ft)
- Owner: Rhaetian Railway
- Line: Landquart–Thusis line
- Distance: 20.2 km (12.6 mi) from Landquart
- Train operators: Rhaetian Railway
- Connections: Bus und Service buses

History
- Opened: 1 July 1896
- Electrified: 1 August 1921

Passengers
- 2018: 1,500 per weekday

Services
| Preceding station | Rhaetian Railway | Following station |
|---|---|---|
| Reichenau-Tamins towards Disentis/Mustér | RE 7 | Chur Terminus |
| Bonaduz towards Thusis | RE 8 | Chur Terminus |
| Preceding station | Chur S-Bahn | Following station |
| Ems Werk towards Thusis | S1 | Felsberg towards Schiers |
| Ems Werk towards Rhäzüns | S2 | Felsberg towards Schiers |
Location

Domat/Ems railway station is a railway station in Domat/Ems, Switzerland. It is located on the Landquart–Thusis line of the Rhaetian Railway.

== Services ==
As of the December 2023 timetable change, the following services stop at Domat/Ems:

- RegioExpress: half-hourly service to Chur and hourly service to Disentis/Mustér and Thusis.
- Chur S-Bahn: S1 / S2: half-hourly service between Rhäzüns and Schiers and hourly service to Thusis.
