= Zizers railway station =

Railway station in Switzerland

Zizers
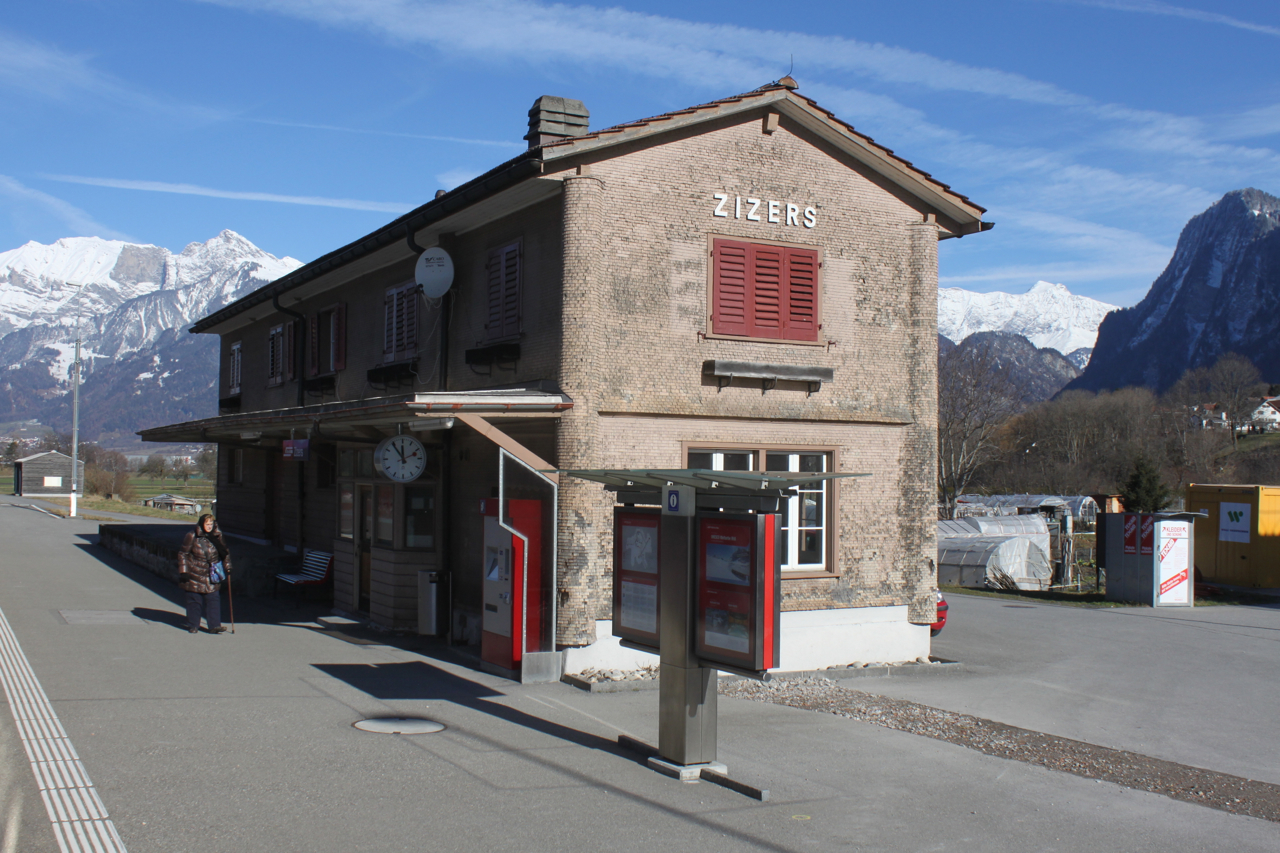
- The station building in 2014

General information
- Location: Stationsstrasse 1 Zizers; Switzerland
- Coordinates: 46°56′05″N 9°33′35″E
- Elevation: 530 m (1,740 ft)
- Owner: Rhaetian Railway
- Line: Landquart–Thusis line
- Distance: 4.0 km (2.5 mi) from Landquart
- Train operators: Rhaetian Railway

History
- Opened: 29 August 1896
- Electrified: 1 August 1921

Passengers
- 2018: 430 per weekday

Services
Preceding station	Chur S-Bahn	Following station
Untervaz-Trimmis towards Thusis	S1	Igis towards Schiers
Untervaz-Trimmis towards Rhäzüns	S2	Igis towards Schiers
Location

Zizers railway station (German: Bahnhof Zizers) is a railway station in the municipality of Zizers, in the Swiss canton of Grisons. It is an intermediate stop on the Rhaetian Railway 1,000 mm (3 ft 3 3/8 in) metre gauge Landquart–Thusis line. The Swiss Federal Railways standard gauge Chur–Rorschach line runs parallel but has no intermediate stops between Chur and Landquart.

== Services ==
As of the December 2023 timetable change, the following services stop at Zizers:

- Chur S-Bahn: S1 / S2: half-hourly service between Rhäzüns and Schiers and hourly service to Thusis.
