= Felsberg railway station =

Railway station in Domat/Ems, Switzerland

Felsberg
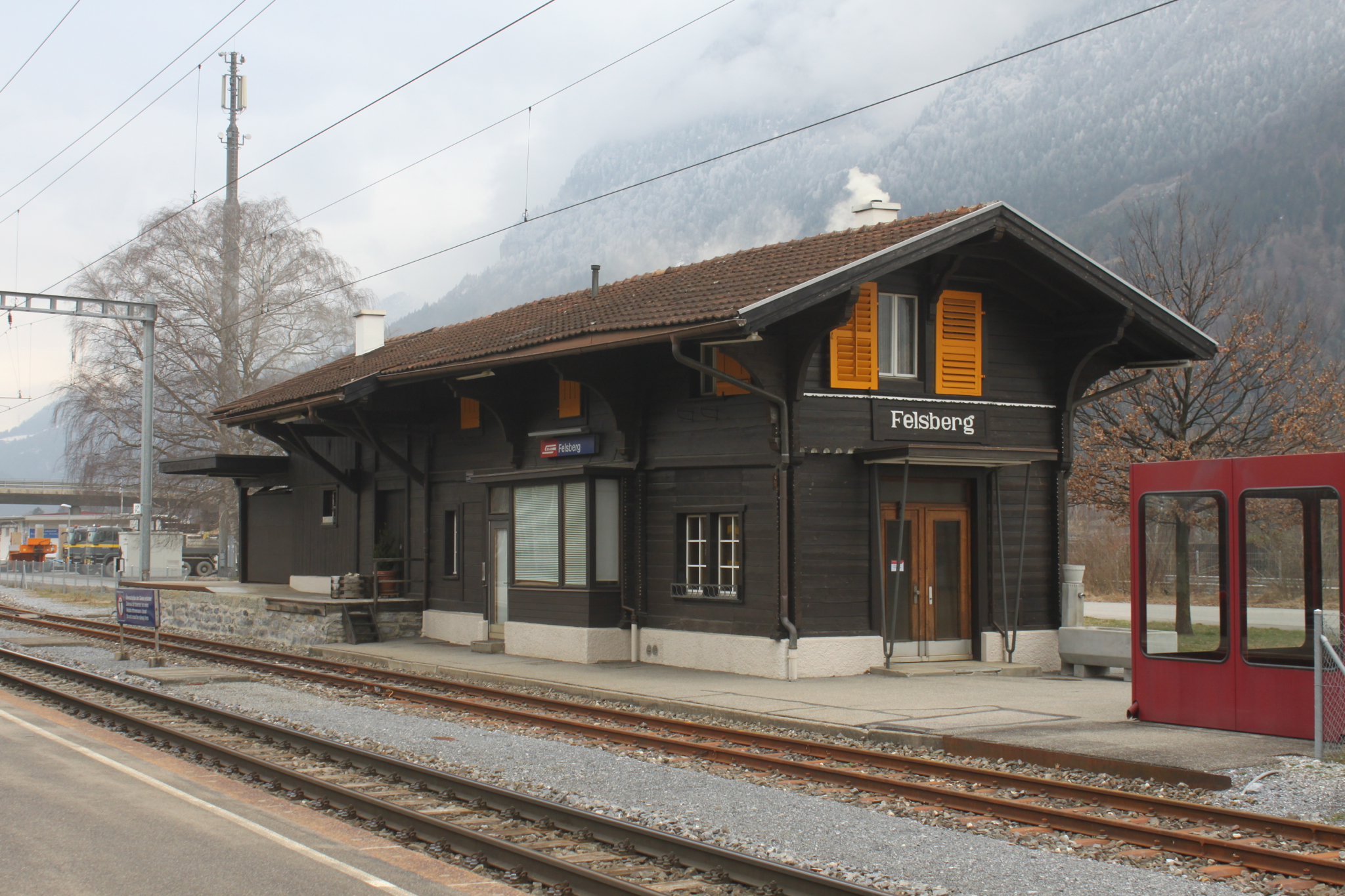
- The station building in 2015

General information
- Location: Domat/Ems; Switzerland
- Coordinates: 46°50′35″N 9°28′53″E
- Elevation: 569 m (1,867 ft)
- Owner: Rhaetian Railway
- Line: Landquart–Thusis line
- Distance: 17.7 km (11.0 mi) from Landquart
- Train operators: Rhaetian Railway
- Connections: Bus und Service buses

History
- Opened: 1 July 1896
- Electrified: 1 August 1921

Passengers
- 2018: 270 per weekday

Services
| Preceding station | Chur S-Bahn | Following station |
|---|---|---|
| Domat/Ems towards Thusis | S1 | Chur West towards Schiers |
| Domat/Ems towards Rhäzüns | S2 | Chur West towards Schiers |
Location

Felsberg railway station is a railway station in Domat/Ems, Switzerland. It takes its name from Felsberg, on the opposite side of the Rhine. It is located on the Landquart–Thusis line of the Rhaetian Railway. It is served twice hourly by Chur S-Bahn trains in each direction.

== Services ==
As of the December 2023 timetable change, the following services stop at Felsberg:

- Chur S-Bahn: S1 / S2: half-hourly service between Rhäzüns and Schiers and hourly service to Thusis.
