= Untervaz-Trimmis railway station =

Railway station in Switzerland

Untervaz-Trimmis
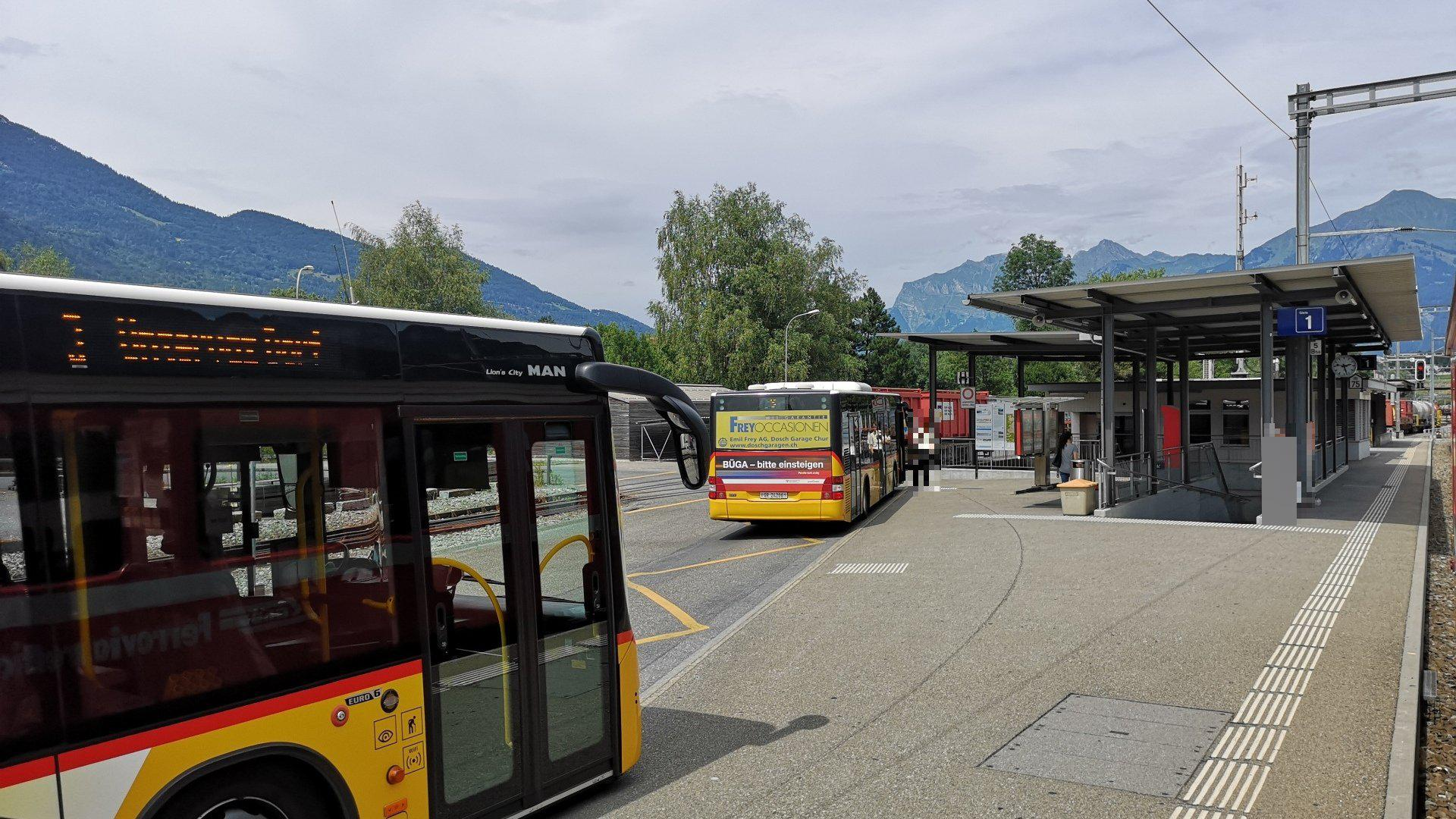
- Buses at the station in 2018

General information
- Location: Trimmis; Switzerland
- Coordinates: 46°55′08″N 9°33′33″E
- Elevation: 536 m (1,759 ft)
- Owner: Rhaetian Railway
- Line: Landquart–Thusis line
- Distance: 5.8 km (3.6 mi) from Landquart
- Train operators: Rhaetian Railway
- Connections: PostAuto Schweiz buses

History
- Opened: 29 August 1896
- Electrified: 1 August 1921
- Former names: Untervaz

Passengers
- 2018: 860 per weekday

Services
Preceding station	Chur S-Bahn	Following station
Haldenstein towards Thusis	S1	Zizers towards Schiers
Chur Wiesental towards Rhäzüns	S2	Zizers towards Schiers
Location

Untervaz-Trimmis railway station (German: Bahnhof Untervaz-Trimmis) is a railway station in the municipality of Trimmis, in the Swiss canton of Grisons. It is an intermediate stop on the Rhaetian Railway 1,000 mm (3 ft 3 3/8 in) metre gauge Landquart–Thusis line. The Swiss Federal Railways standard gauge Chur–Rorschach line runs parallel but has no intermediate stops between Chur and Landquart.

== Services ==
As of the December 2023 timetable change, the following services stop at Untervaz-Trimmis:

- Chur S-Bahn: S1 / S2: half-hourly service between Rhäzüns and Schiers and hourly service to Thusis.
