= Bonaduz railway station =

Railway station in Switzerland

Bonaduz
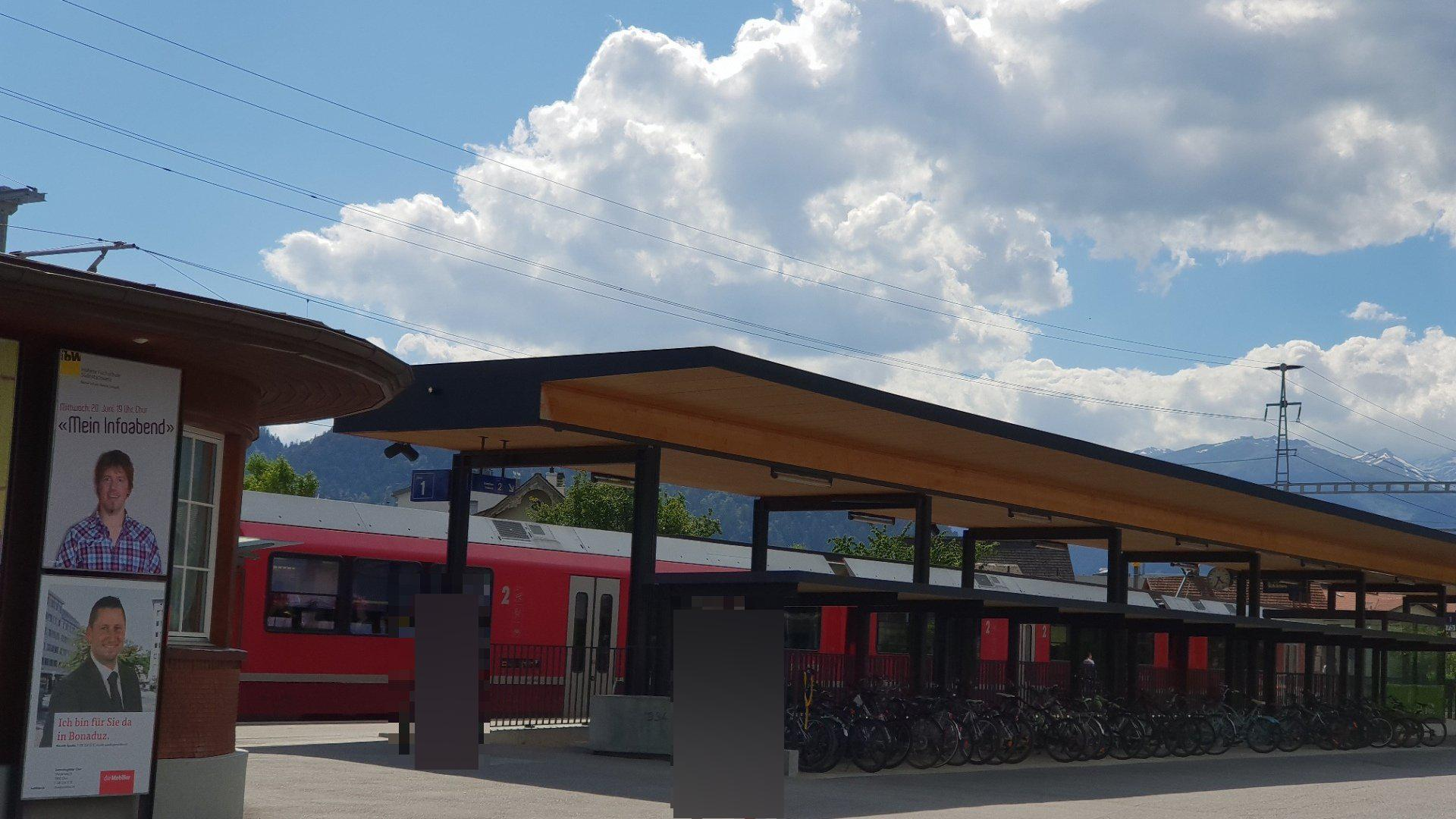
- The station platform in 2018

General information
- Location: Bahnstrasse 1 Bonaduz; Switzerland
- Coordinates: 46°48′37″N 9°23′52″E
- Elevation: 659 m (2,162 ft)
- Owner: Rhaetian Railway
- Line: Landquart–Thusis line
- Distance: 27.4 km (17.0 mi) from Landquart
- Train operators: Rhaetian Railway
- Connections: Bus und Service buses

History
- Opened: 1 July 1896
- Electrified: 1 August 1921

Passengers
- 2018: 1,000 per weekday

Services
Preceding station	Rhaetian Railway	Following station
Rhäzüns towards Thusis	RE 8	Reichenau-Tamins towards Chur
Preceding station	Chur S-Bahn	Following station
Rhäzüns towards Thusis	S1	Reichenau-Tamins towards Schiers
Rhäzüns Terminus	S2	Reichenau-Tamins towards Schiers
Location

Bonaduz railway station is a station in Bonaduz, Switzerland. It is located on the 1,000 mm (3 ft 3 3/8 in) gauge Landquart–Thusis line of the Rhaetian Railway.

== Services ==
As of the December 2023 timetable change, the following services stop at Bonaduz:

- RegioExpress: hourly service between Thusis and Chur.
- Chur S-Bahn: S1 / S2: half-hourly service between Rhäzüns and Schiers and hourly service to Thusis.
