= Rothenbrunnen railway station =

Railway station in Switzerland

Rothenbrunnen
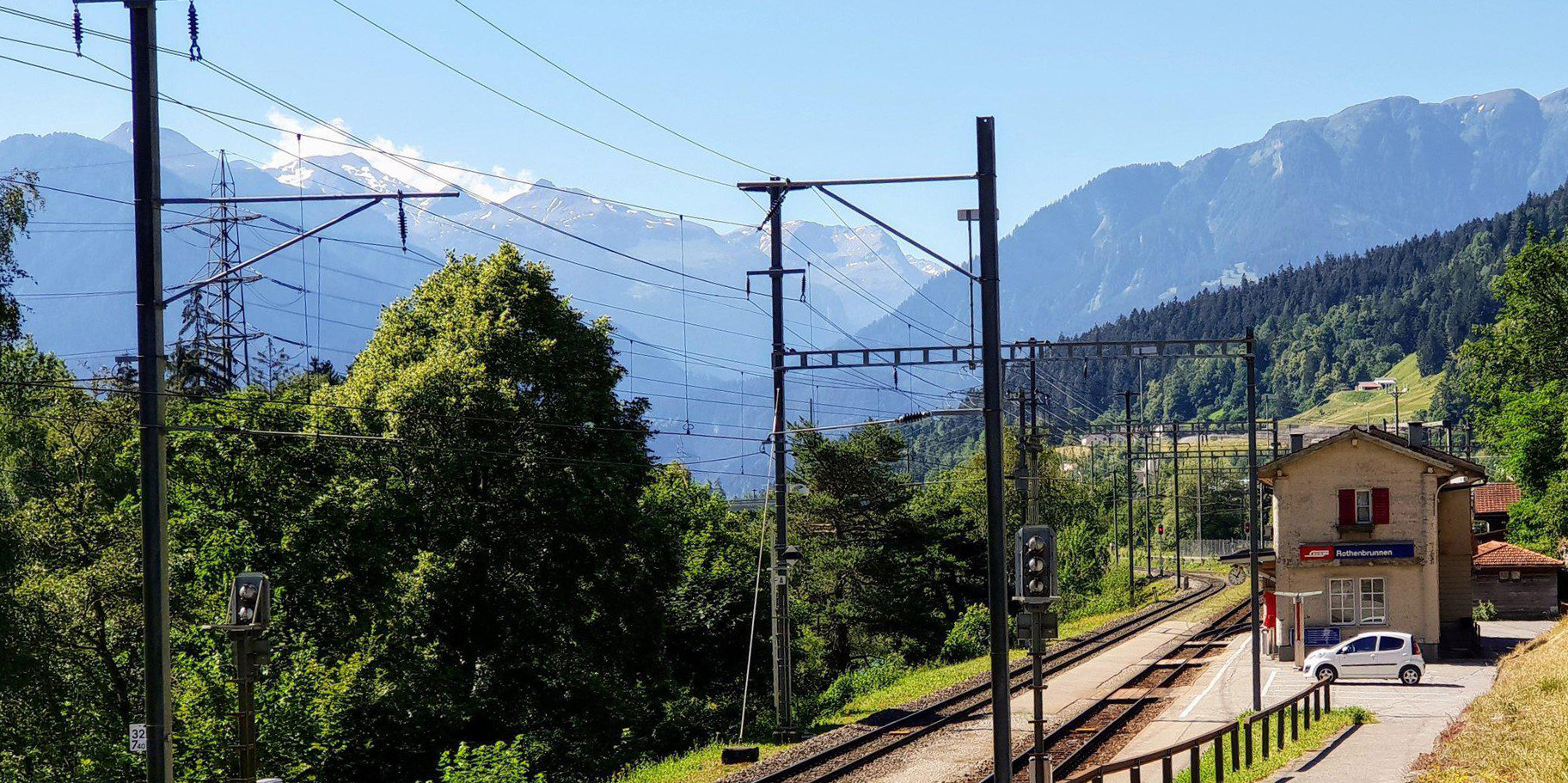
- The station in 2018

General information
- Location: Hauptstrasse; Cazis; Switzerland
- Coordinates: 46°46′04″N 9°25′11″E
- Elevation: 621 m (2,037 ft)
- Owner: Rhaetian Railway
- Line: Landquart–Thusis line
- Distance: 32.8 km (20.4 mi) from Landquart
- Train operators: Rhaetian Railway
- Connections: PostAuto Schweiz buses

History
- Opened: 1 July 1896
- Electrified: 1 August 1921

Passengers
- 2018: 180 per weekday

Services
Preceding station	Chur S-Bahn	Following station
Rodels-Realta towards Thusis	S1	Rhäzüns towards Schiers
Location

Rothenbrunnen railway station is a station in Cazis, Switzerland. It is located on the 1,000 mm (3 ft 3 3/8 in) gauge Landquart–Thusis line of the Rhaetian Railway. It serves the nearby municipality of Rothenbrunnen.

== Services ==
As of the December 2023 timetable change, the following services stop at Rothenbrunnen:

- Chur S-Bahn S1: hourly service between Thusis and Schiers.
