= Ems Werk railway station =

Railway station in Switzerland

Ems Werk
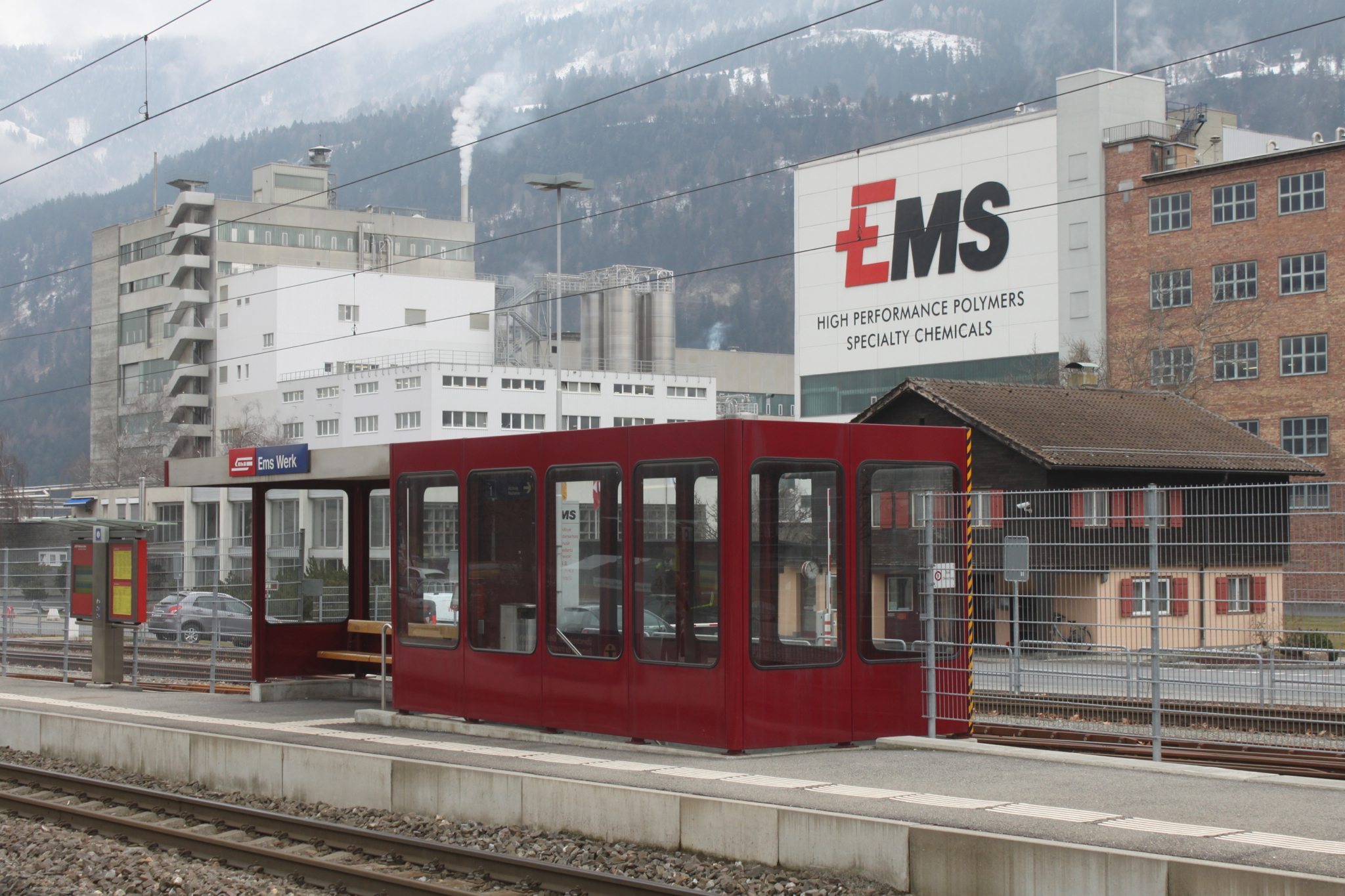
- The station platform in 2015

General information
- Location: Reichenauerstrasse; Domat/Ems; Switzerland
- Coordinates: 46°49′43″N 9°25′49″E
- Owner: Rhaetian Railway
- Line: Landquart–Thusis line
- Distance: 22.0 km (13.7 mi) from Landquart
- Train operators: Rhaetian Railway
- Connections: Bus und Service buses

Passengers
- 2018: 430 per weekday

Services
| Preceding station | Chur S-Bahn | Following station |
|---|---|---|
| Reichenau-Tamins towards Thusis | S1 | Domat/Ems towards Schiers |
| Reichenau-Tamins towards Rhäzüns | S2 | Domat/Ems towards Schiers |
Location

Ems Werk railway station is a railway station near Ems, Switzerland. It is located on the Landquart–Thusis line of the Rhaetian Railway, adjacent to the Ems-Chemie factory.

== Services ==
As of the December 2023 timetable change, the following services stop at Ems Werk:

- Chur S-Bahn: S1 / S2: half-hourly service between Rhäzüns and Schiers and hourly service to Thusis.
