= Chur Wiesental railway station =

Railway station in Switzerland

Chur Wiesental
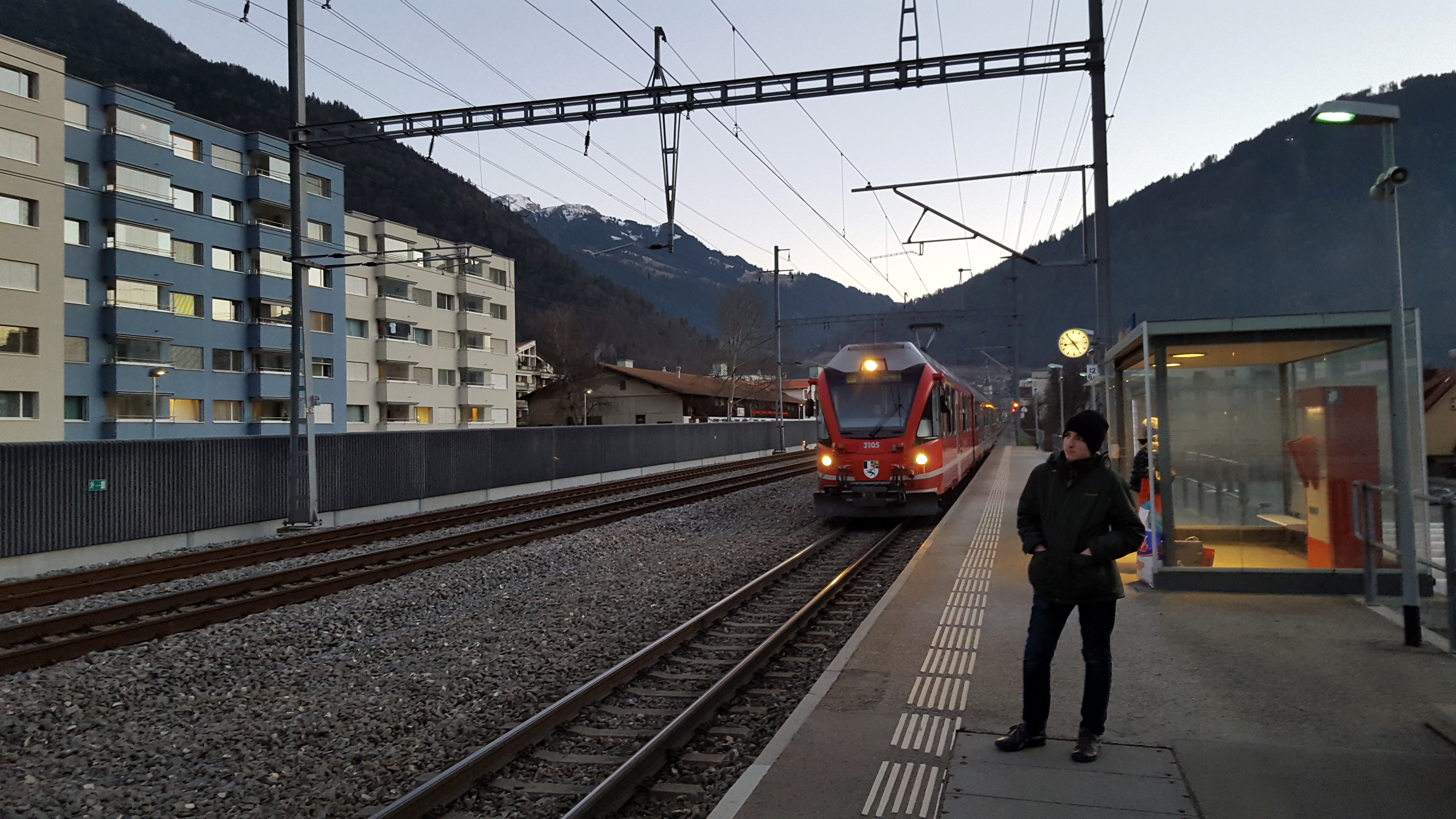
- A Landquart-bound RegioExpress train arrives at Chur Wiesental in 2016

General information
- Location: Wiesentalstrasse; Chur; Switzerland
- Coordinates: 46°51′43″N 9°31′53″E
- Owner: Rhaetian Railway
- Line: Landquart–Thusis line
- Train operators: Rhaetian Railway
- Connections: Bus und Service buses

History
- Opened: 9 December 2007

Passengers
- 2018: 170 per weekday

Services
Preceding station	Chur S-Bahn	Following station
Chur towards Thusis	S1	Haldenstein towards Schiers
Chur towards Rhäzüns	S2	Untervaz-Trimmis towards Schiers
Location

Chur Wiesental railway station is a railway station in the northern part of the town of Chur, the capital of the Swiss canton of Grisons. The station is on the Rhaetian Railway's single-track 1,000 mm (3 ft 3 3/8 in) metre gauge Landquart–Thusis line, and has one side platform. The two-track SBB line runs parallel but has no intermediate stops between Chur and Landquart.

== History ==
Chur Wiesental opened on 9 December 2007. The SFr 1.2 million cost was split between the Rhaetian Railway, Chur, the canton of Grisons, the federal government, and the Manor department store.

== Services ==
As of the December 2023 timetable change, the following services stop at Chur Wiesental:

- Chur S-Bahn: S1 / S2: half-hourly service between Rhäzüns and Schiers and hourly service to Thusis.
