= Haldenstein railway station =

Railway station in Switzerland

Haldenstein
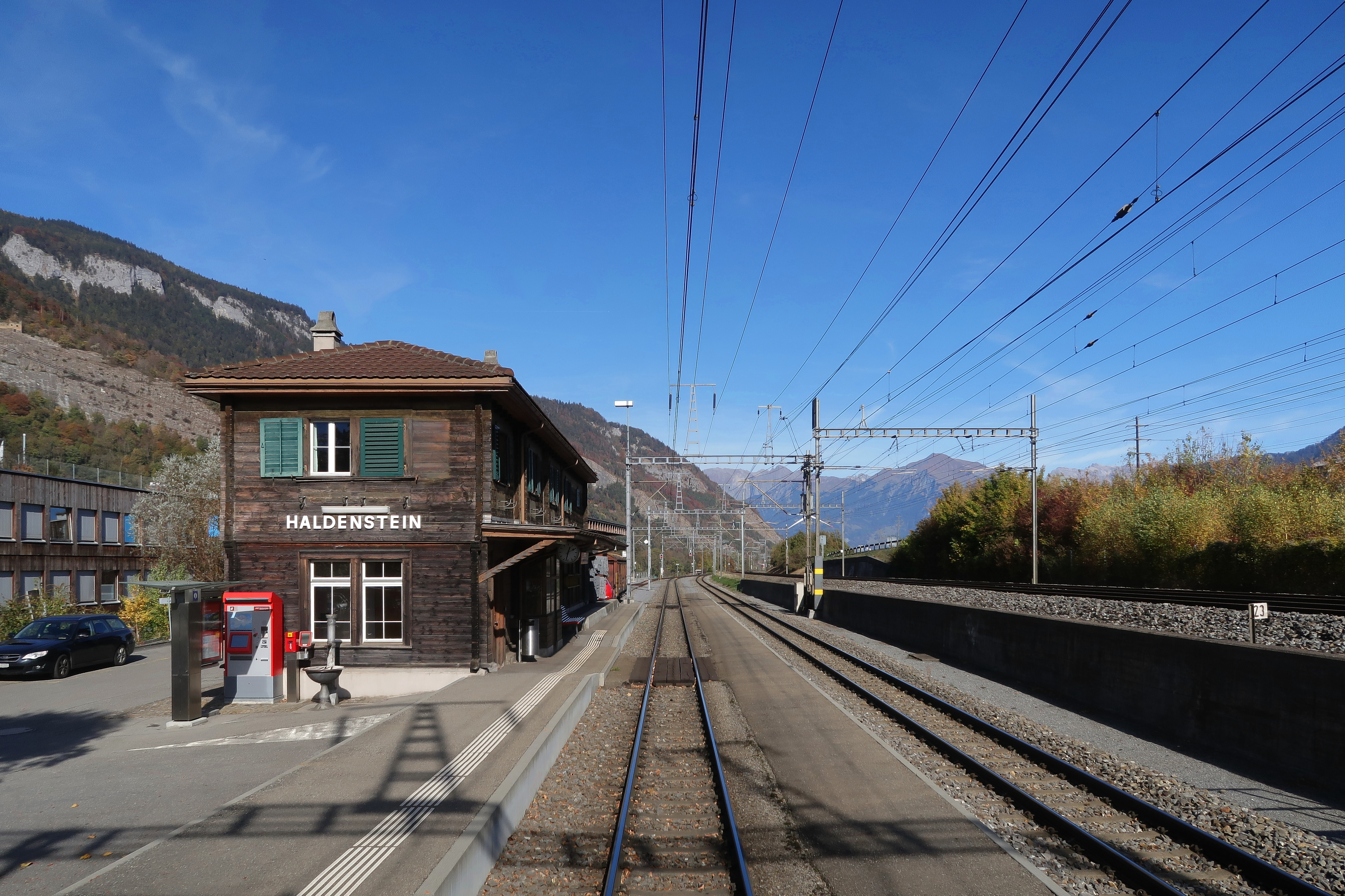
- The station building in 2018

General information
- Location: Dornäuliweg; Chur; Switzerland
- Coordinates: 46°52′37″N 9°31′59″E
- Elevation: 562 m (1,844 ft)
- Owner: Rhaetian Railway
- Line: Landquart–Thusis line
- Distance: 11.0 km (6.8 mi) from Landquart
- Train operators: Rhaetian Railway
- Connections: Bus und Service buses

History
- Opened: 29 August 1896
- Electrified: 1 August 1921

Passengers
- 2018: 60 per weekday

Services
Preceding station	Chur S-Bahn	Following station
Chur Wiesental towards Thusis	S1	Untervaz-Trimmis towards Schiers
Location

Haldenstein railway station is a railway station in the northern part of the municipality of Chur, in the Swiss canton of Grisons. The station is on the Rhaetian Railway's 1,000 mm (3 ft 3 3/8 in) metre gauge Landquart–Thusis line. The Swiss Federal Railways Chur–Rorschach line runs parallel but has no intermediate stops between Chur and Landquart. The station serves the municipality of Haldenstein, located on the other side of the River Rhine.

== Services ==
As of the December 2025 timetable change, Haldenstein is served by two daily trains to Landquart, with one continuing to Davos Platz.
