= Chur West railway station =

Railway station in Switzerland

Chur West
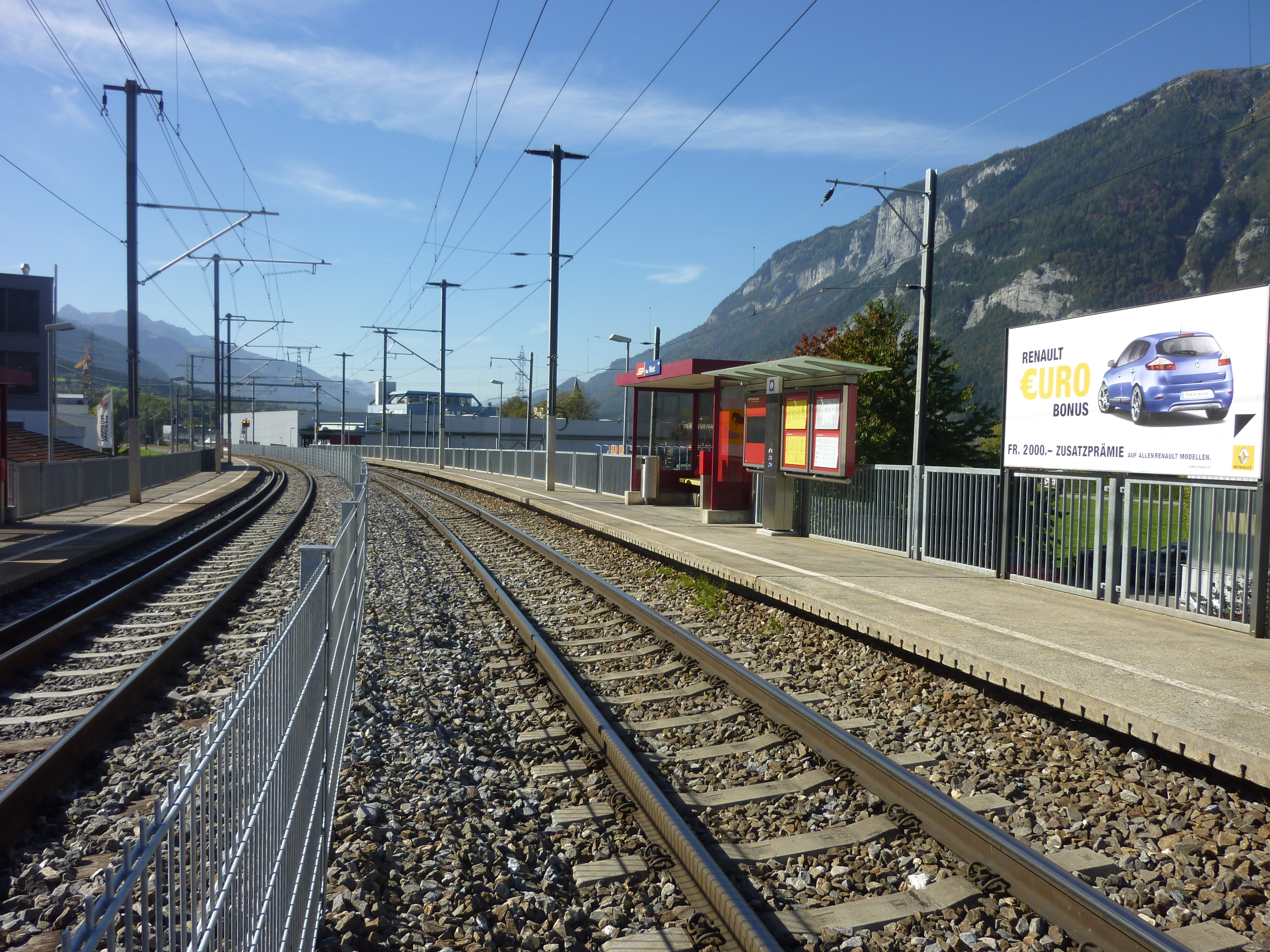
- The station platforms in 2010

General information
- Location: Schönbühlstrasse; Chur; Switzerland
- Coordinates: 46°51′00″N 9°30′46″E
- Owner: Rhaetian Railway
- Line: Landquart–Thusis line
- Distance: 15.2 km (9.4 mi) from Landquart
- Train operators: Rhaetian Railway
- Connections: Bus und Service buses

History
- Opened: 2000

Passengers
- 2018: 660 per weekday

Services
Preceding station	Chur S-Bahn	Following station
Felsberg towards Thusis	S1	Chur towards Schiers
Felsberg towards Rhäzüns	S2	Chur towards Schiers
Location

Chur West railway station is a railway station in Chur, Switzerland. It is located on the Landquart–Thusis line of the Rhaetian Railway. It is served twice hourly by Chur S-Bahn trains in each direction.

== Services ==
As of the December 2023 timetable change, the following services stop at Chur West:

- Chur S-Bahn: S1 / S2: half-hourly service between Rhäzüns and Schiers and hourly service to Thusis.
