= Rodels-Realta railway station =

Railway station in Switzerland

Rodels-Realta
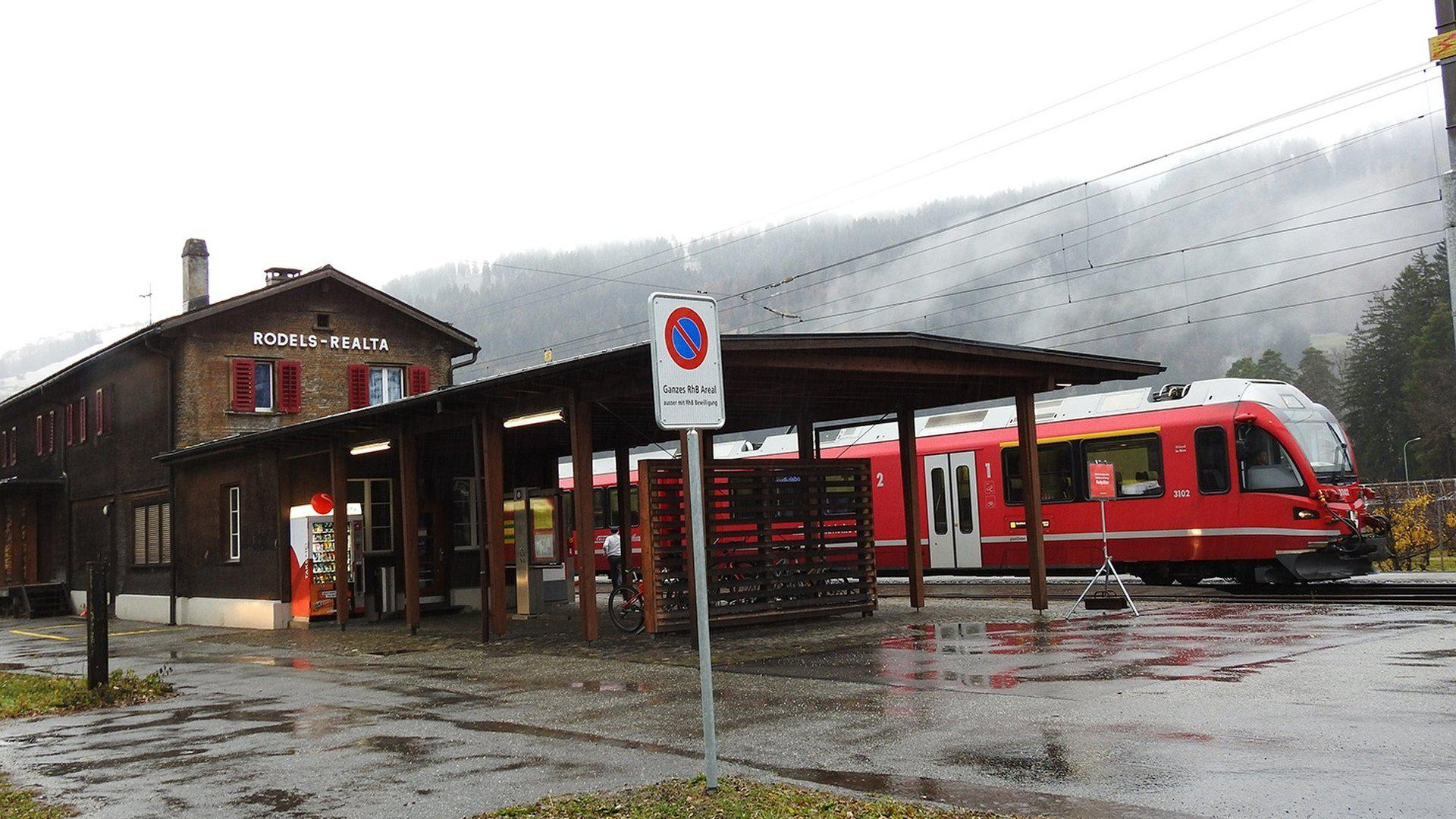
- The station in 2018

General information
- Location: Bahnhofstrasse; Cazis; Switzerland
- Coordinates: 46°44′07″N 9°25′59″E
- Elevation: 639 m (2,096 ft)
- Owner: Rhaetian Railway
- Line: Landquart–Thusis line
- Distance: 36.6 km (22.7 mi) from Landquart
- Train operators: Rhaetian Railway

History
- Opened: 1 July 1896
- Electrified: 1 August 1921

Passengers
- 2018: 100 per weekday

Services
Preceding station	Chur S-Bahn	Following station
Cazis towards Thusis	S1	Rothenbrunnen towards Schiers
Location

Rodels-Realta railway station is a station in Cazis, Switzerland. It is located on the 1,000 mm (3 ft 3 3/8 in) gauge Landquart–Thusis line of the Rhaetian Railway. It serves the villages of Rodels and Realta.

== Services ==
As of the December 2023 timetable change, the following services stop at Rodels-Realta:

- Chur S-Bahn S1: hourly service between Thusis and Schiers.
