= Seewis-Pardisla railway station =

Railway station in Switzerland

Seewis-Pardisla
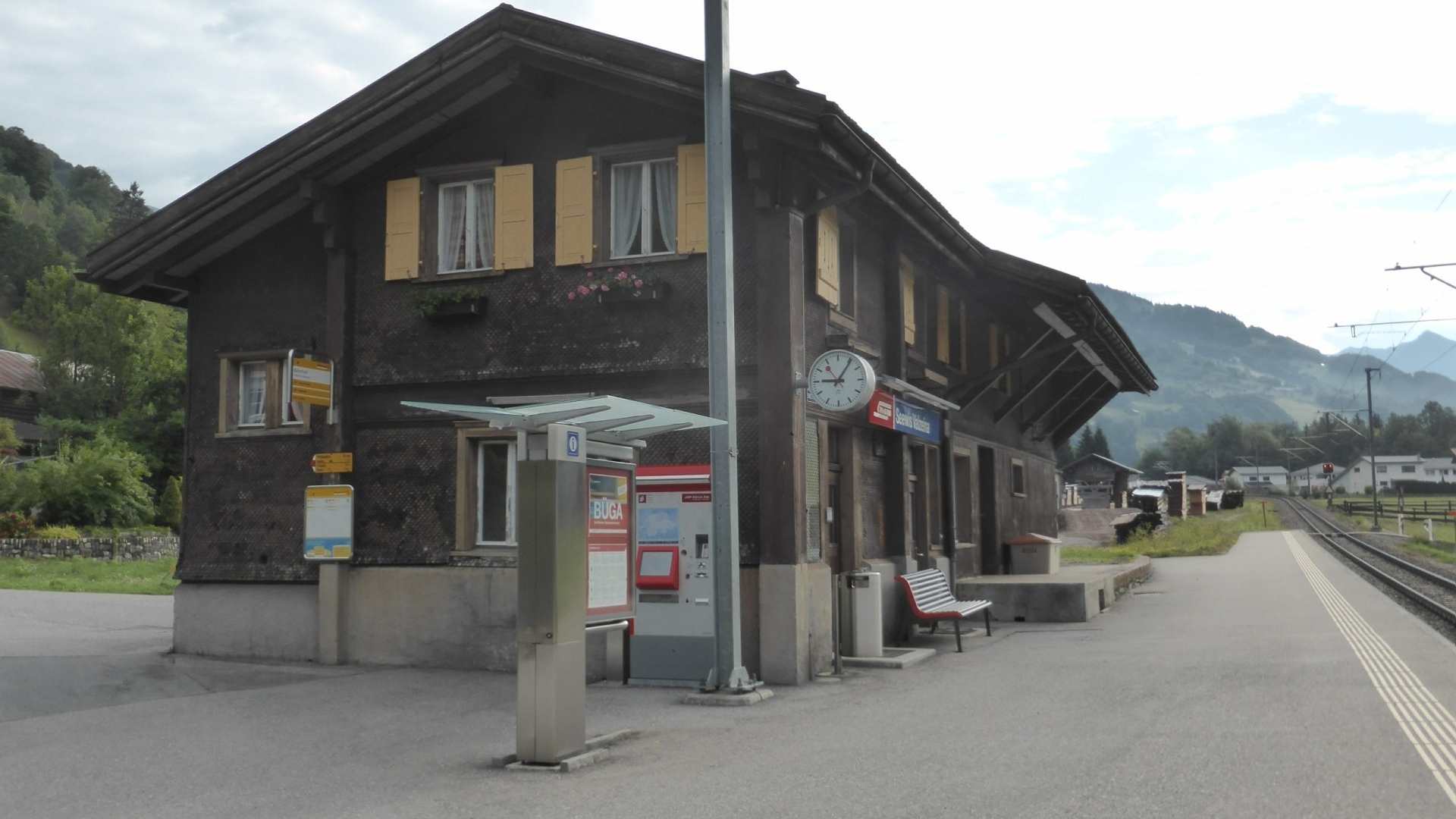
- The station building in 2018

General information
- Location: Seewis im Prättigau; Switzerland
- Coordinates: 46°58′37″N 9°37′57″E
- Elevation: 593 m (1,946 ft)
- Owner: Rhaetian Railway
- Line: Landquart–Davos Platz line
- Distance: 6.7 km (4.2 mi) from Landquart
- Train operators: Rhaetian Railway
- Connections: PostAuto Schweiz buses

History
- Former names: Seewis-Valzeina

Passengers
- 2018: 80 per weekday

Services
Preceding station	Chur S-Bahn	Following station
Malans towards Rhäzüns	S2	Grüsch towards Schiers
Location

Seewis-Pardisla railway station (German: Bahnhof Seewis-Pardisla) is a railway station in the municipality of Seewis im Prättigau, in the Swiss canton of Grisons. It is an intermediate stop on the Rhaetian Railway 1,000 mm (3 ft 3 3/8 in) metre gauge Landquart–Davos Platz line. Prior to December 2018 it was known as Seewis-Valzeina.

== Services ==
As of the December 2023 timetable change, the following services stop at Seewis-Pardisla:

- Chur S-Bahn S2: hourly service between Rhäzüns and Schiers.
