= Grüsch railway station =

Railway station in Switzerland

Grüsch
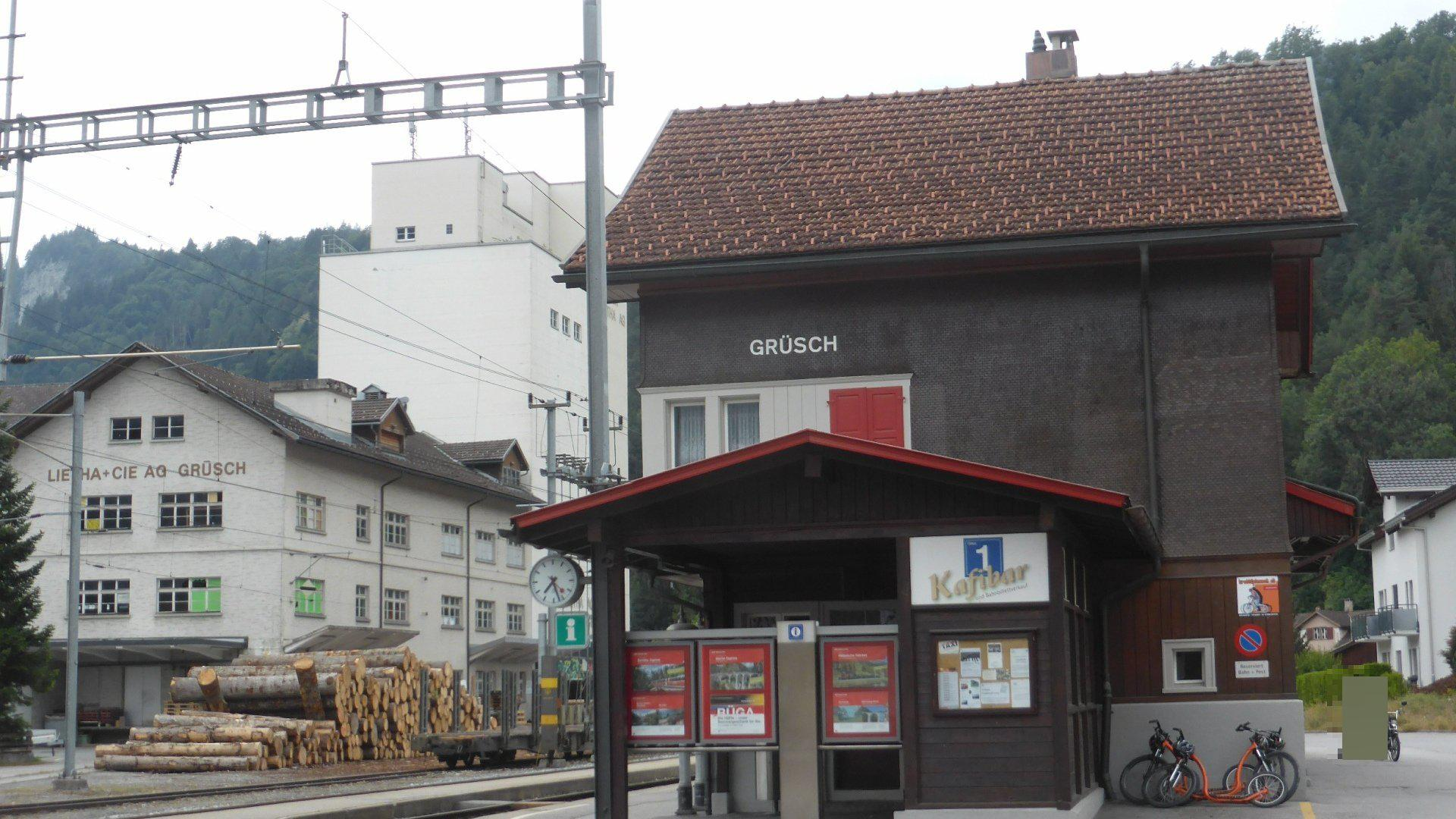
- The station building in 2018

General information
- Location: Bahnhofsträssli 58; Grüsch; Switzerland
- Coordinates: 46°58′50″N 9°38′45″E
- Elevation: 630 m (2,070 ft)
- Owner: Rhaetian Railway
- Line: Landquart–Davos Platz line
- Distance: 7.9 km (4.9 mi) from Landquart
- Platforms: 2
- Train operators: Rhaetian Railway
- Connections: PostAuto Schweiz buses

History
- Opened: 9 October 1889
- Electrified: 7 November 1921

Passengers
- 2018: 760 per weekday

Services
Preceding station	Chur S-Bahn	Following station
Malans towards Thusis	S1	Schiers Terminus
Seewis-Pardisla towards Rhäzüns	S2	Schiers Terminus
Location

Grüsch railway station (German: Bahnhof Grüsch) is a railway station in the municipality of Grüsch, in the Swiss canton of Grisons. It is an intermediate stop on the Rhaetian Railway 1,000 mm (3 ft 3 3/8 in) metre gauge Landquart–Davos Platz line.

== Services ==
As of the December 2023 timetable change, the following services stop at Grüsch:

- Chur S-Bahn: S1 / S2: half-hourly service between Rhäzüns and Schiers and hourly service to Thusis.
