= Malans railway station =

Railway station in Switzerland

Malans
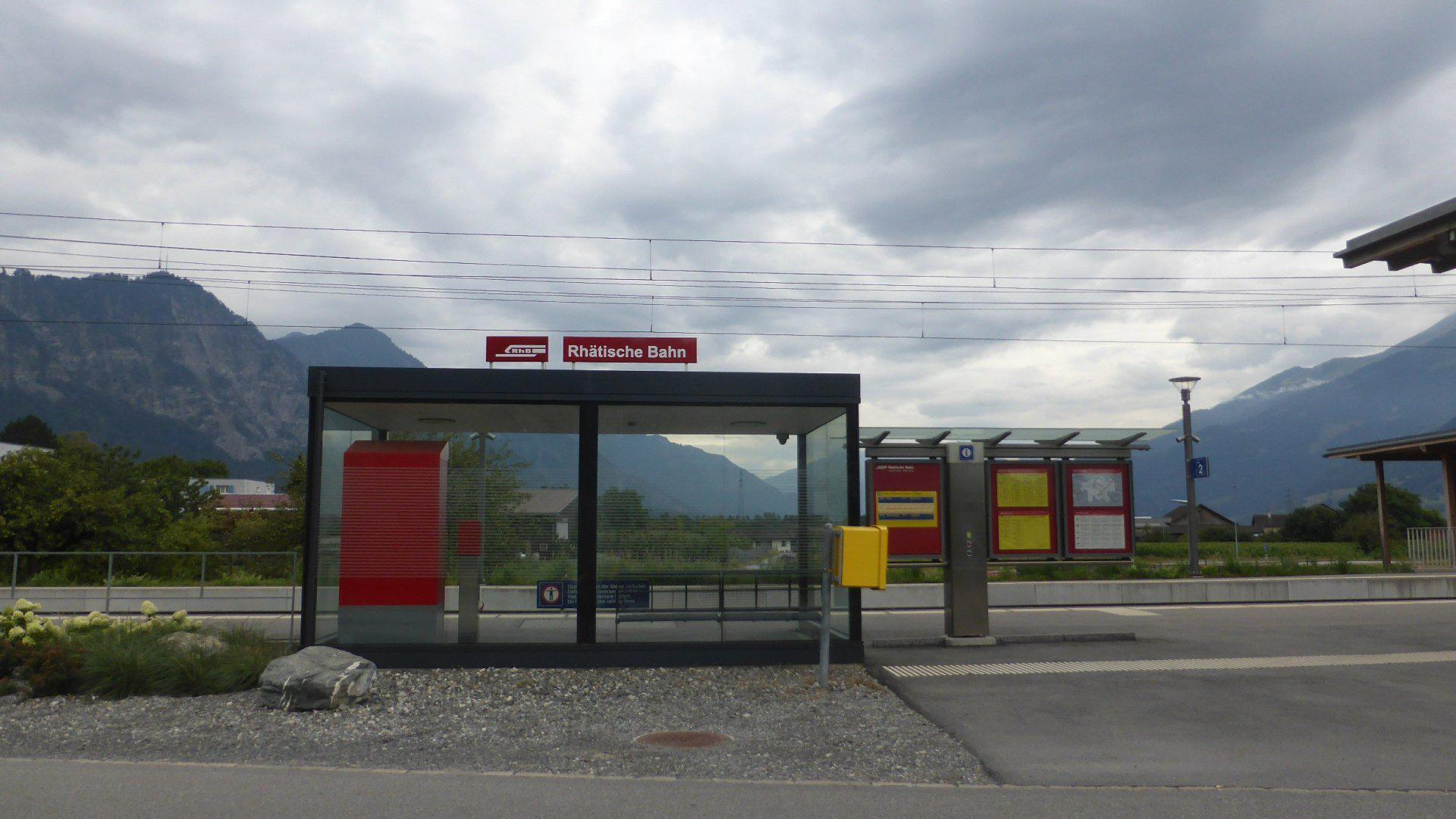
- The station platform in 2018

General information
- Location: Bahnhofstrasse 4 Malans; Switzerland
- Coordinates: 46°58′40″N 9°34′25″E
- Elevation: 536 m (1,759 ft)
- Owner: Rhaetian Railway
- Line: Landquart–Davos Platz line
- Distance: 2.1 km (1.3 mi) from Landquart
- Platforms: 2
- Train operators: Rhaetian Railway
- Connections: PostAuto Schweiz buses

History
- Opened: 9 October 1889
- Electrified: 7 November 1921

Passengers
- 2018: 450 per weekday

Services
Preceding station	Chur S-Bahn	Following station
Landquart towards Thusis	S1	Grüsch towards Schiers
Landquart towards Rhäzüns	S2	Seewis-Pardisla towards Schiers
Location

Malans railway station (German: Bahnhof Malans) is a railway station in the municipality of Malans, in the Swiss canton of Grisons. It is an intermediate stop on the Rhaetian Railway 1,000 mm (3 ft 3 3/8 in) metre gauge Landquart–Davos Platz line.

== Services ==
As of the December 2023 timetable change, the following services stop at Malans:

- Chur S-Bahn: S1 / S2: half-hourly service between Rhäzüns and Schiers and hourly service to Thusis.
