= Cazis railway station =

Railway station in Switzerland

Cazis
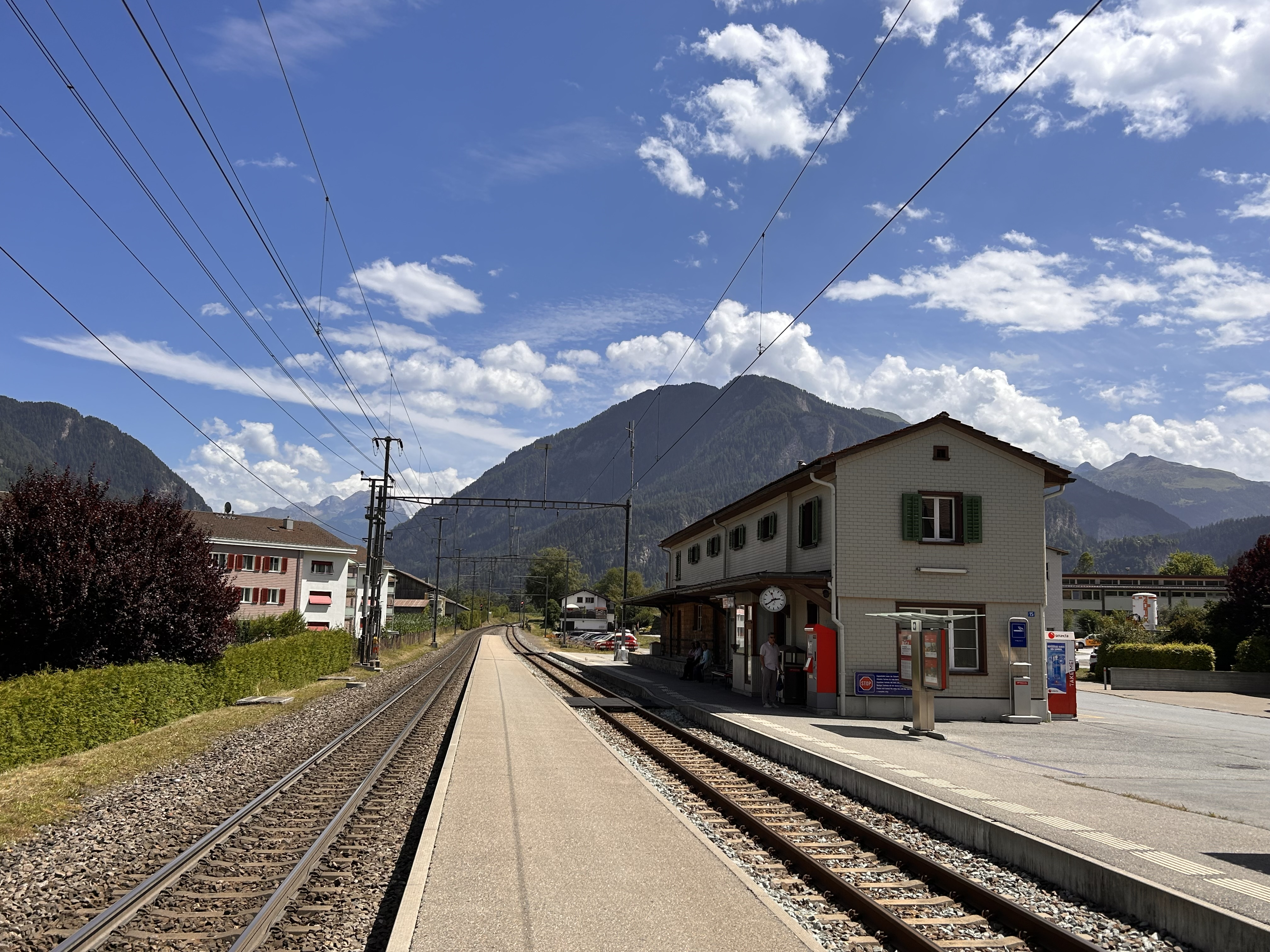
- The station building in 2023

General information
- Location: Bahnhofstrasse 62; Cazis; Switzerland
- Coordinates: 46°43′12″N 9°25′59″E
- Elevation: 657 m (2,156 ft)
- Owner: Rhaetian Railway
- Line: Landquart–Thusis line
- Distance: 38.5 km (23.9 mi) from Landquart
- Train operators: Rhaetian Railway

History
- Opened: 1 July 1896
- Electrified: 1 August 1921

Passengers
- 2018: 310 per weekday

Services
Preceding station	Chur S-Bahn	Following station
Thusis Terminus	S1	Rodels-Realta towards Schiers
Location

Cazis railway station is a station in Cazis, Switzerland. It is located on the 1,000 mm (3 ft 3 3/8 in) gauge Landquart–Thusis line of the Rhaetian Railway.

== Services ==
As of the December 2023 timetable change, the following services stop at Cazis:

- Chur S-Bahn S1: hourly service between Thusis and Schiers.
