= Reichenau-Tamins railway station =

Railway station in the canton of Grisons, Switzerland

Reichenau-Tamins
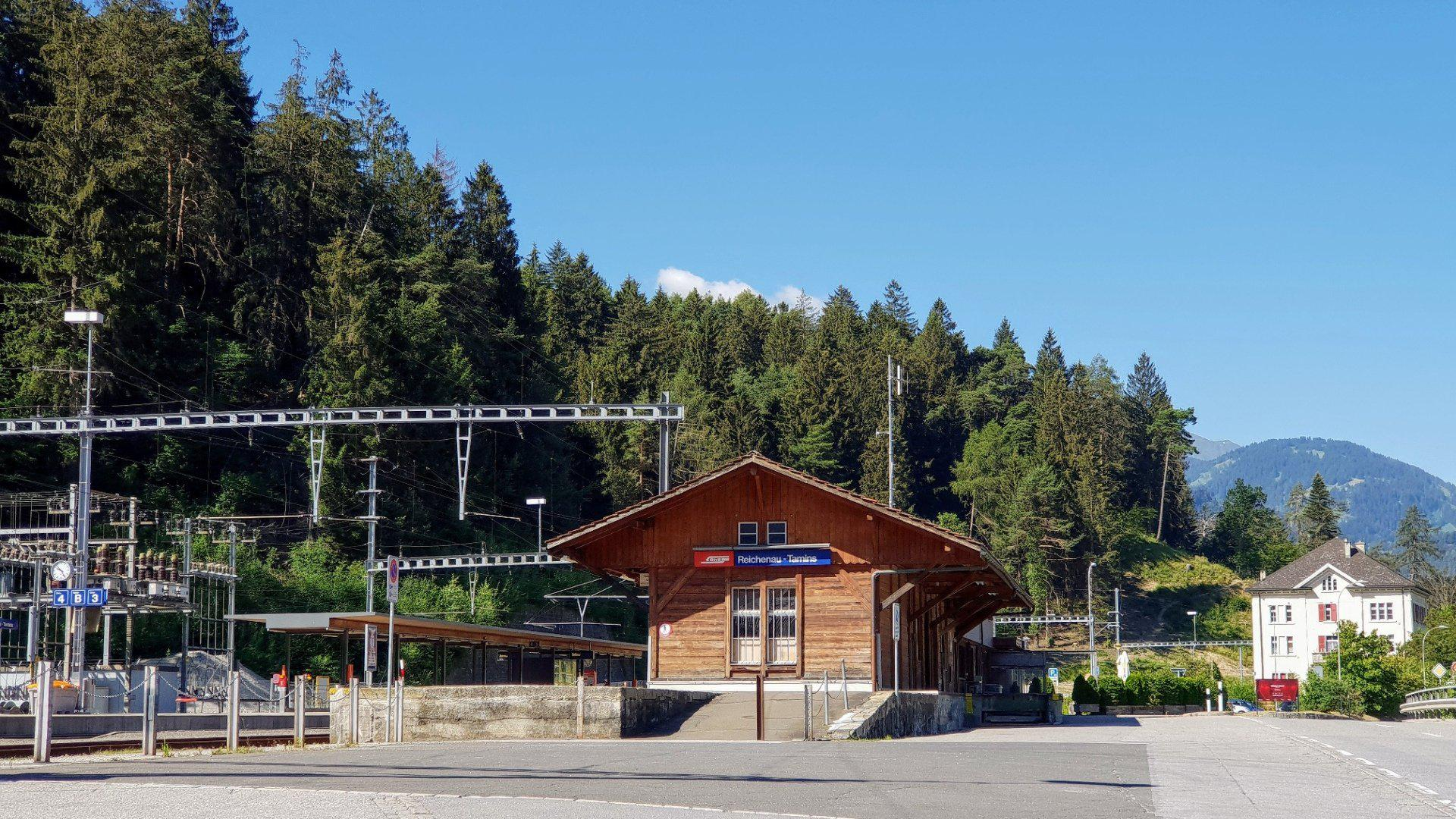
- The station in 2018

General information
- Location: Reichenauerstrasse; Domat/Ems; Switzerland
- Coordinates: 46°49′25″N 9°24′45″E
- Elevation: 604 m (1,982 ft)
- Owner: Rhaetian Railway
- Lines: Landquart–Thusis line; Reichenau-Tamins–Disentis/Mustér line
- Distance: 23.6 km (14.7 mi) from Landquart
- Train operators: Rhaetian Railway
- Connections: Bus und Service buses

History
- Opened: 1 July 1896
- Electrified: 1 August 1921

Passengers
- 2018: 650 per weekday

Services
Preceding station	Rhaetian Railway	Following station
Thusis towards St. Moritz	IR 38	Chur Terminus
Trin towards Disentis/Mustér	RE 7	Domat/Ems towards Chur
Preceding station	Chur S-Bahn	Following station
Bonaduz towards Thusis	S1	Ems Werk towards Schiers
Bonaduz towards Rhäzüns	S2	Ems Werk towards Schiers
Location

Reichenau-Tamins railway station is a railway station in the municipality of Domat/Ems serving the communities of Reichenau and Tamins in Switzerland. It is an important station for connections between the Landquart–Thusis and the Reichenau-Tamins–Disentis/Mustér lines as it is where the two lines diverge. From this station, there are trains to Chur, Disentis, Scuol, St. Moritz and Thusis. At Chur, there are also mainline connecting services to Zürich.

== Services ==
As of the December 2023 timetable change, the following services stop at Reichenau-Tamins:

- InterRegio: hourly service between Chur and St. Moritz.
- RegioExpress: hourly service between Disentis/Mustér and Chur.
- Chur S-Bahn: S1 / S2: half-hourly service between Rhäzüns and Schiers and hourly service to Thusis.
