= Tiefencastel railway station =

Railway station in Switzerland

Tiefencastel
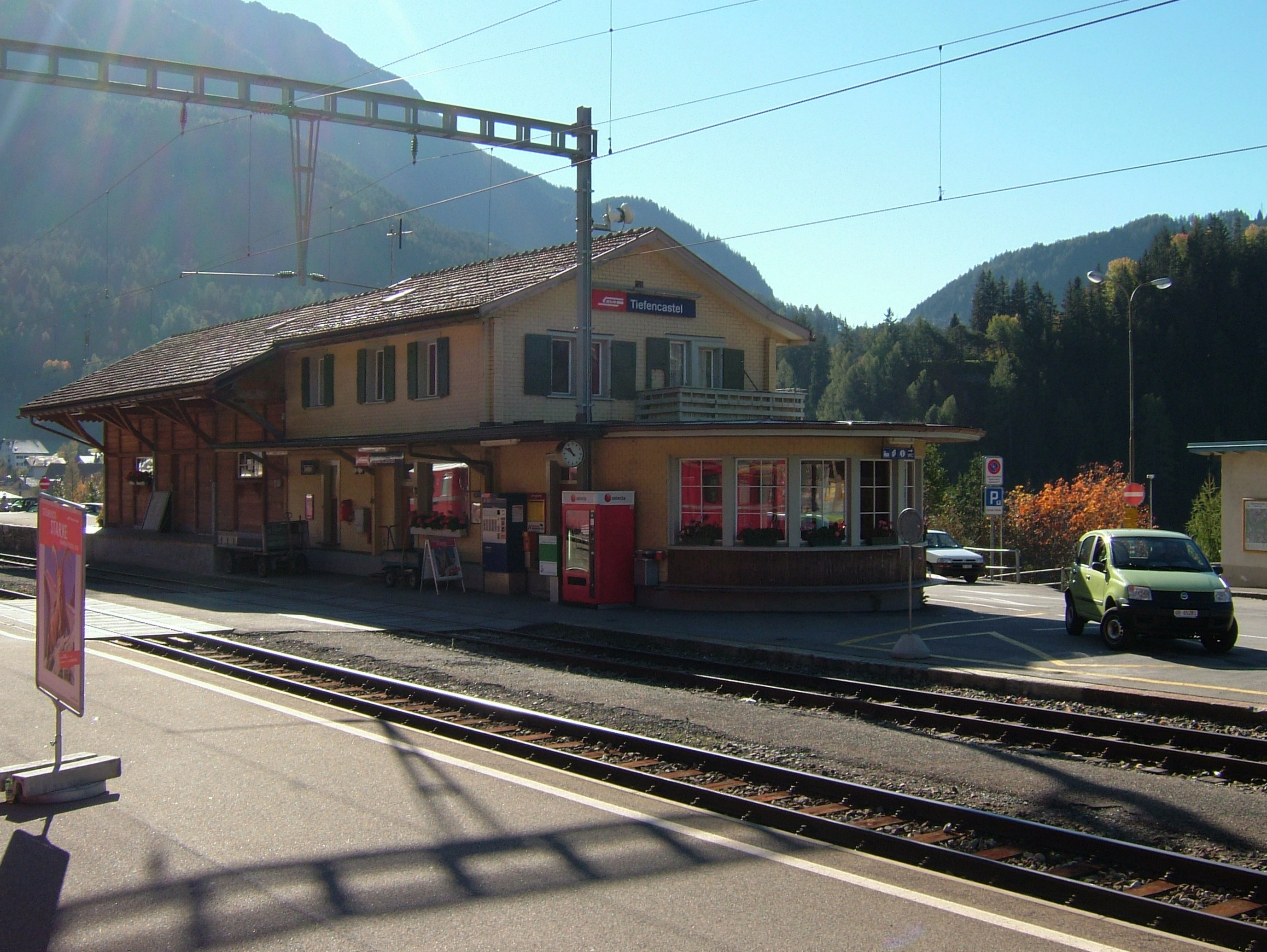
- The station in 2007

General information
- Location: Julierstrasse; Tiefencastel; Switzerland
- Coordinates: 46°39′50″N 9°34′22″E
- Elevation: 884 m (2,900 ft)
- Owner: Rhaetian Railway
- Line: Albula line
- Distance: 53.9 km (33.5 mi) from Landquart
- Train operators: Glacier Express; Rhaetian Railway
- Connections: PostAuto Schweiz buses

History
- Opened: 1 July 1903
- Electrified: 15 October 1919

Passengers
- 2018: 470 per weekday

Services
Preceding station	Rhaetian Railway	Following station
Filisur towards Tirano	Bernina Express	Chur Terminus
Filisur towards St. Moritz	IR 38	Thusis towards Chur
Preceding station	Glacier Express	Following station
Filisur towards St. Moritz	Glacier Express	Chur towards Zermatt
Location

Tiefencastel railway station is a railway station in the municipality of Tiefencastel, in the Swiss canton of Graubünden. It is an intermediate stop on the 1,000 mm (3 ft 3 3/8 in) metre gauge Albula line of the Rhaetian Railway. Hourly services operate on this section of the line.

== Services ==
As of the December 2023 timetable change, the following services stop at Tiefencastel:

- Glacier Express: Several round-trips per day between Zermatt and St. Moritz.
- Bernina Express: Several round-trips per day between Chur and Tirano.
- InterRegio: hourly service between Chur and St. Moritz.
