= Chur railway station =

Railway station in Graubünden, Switzerland

Chur
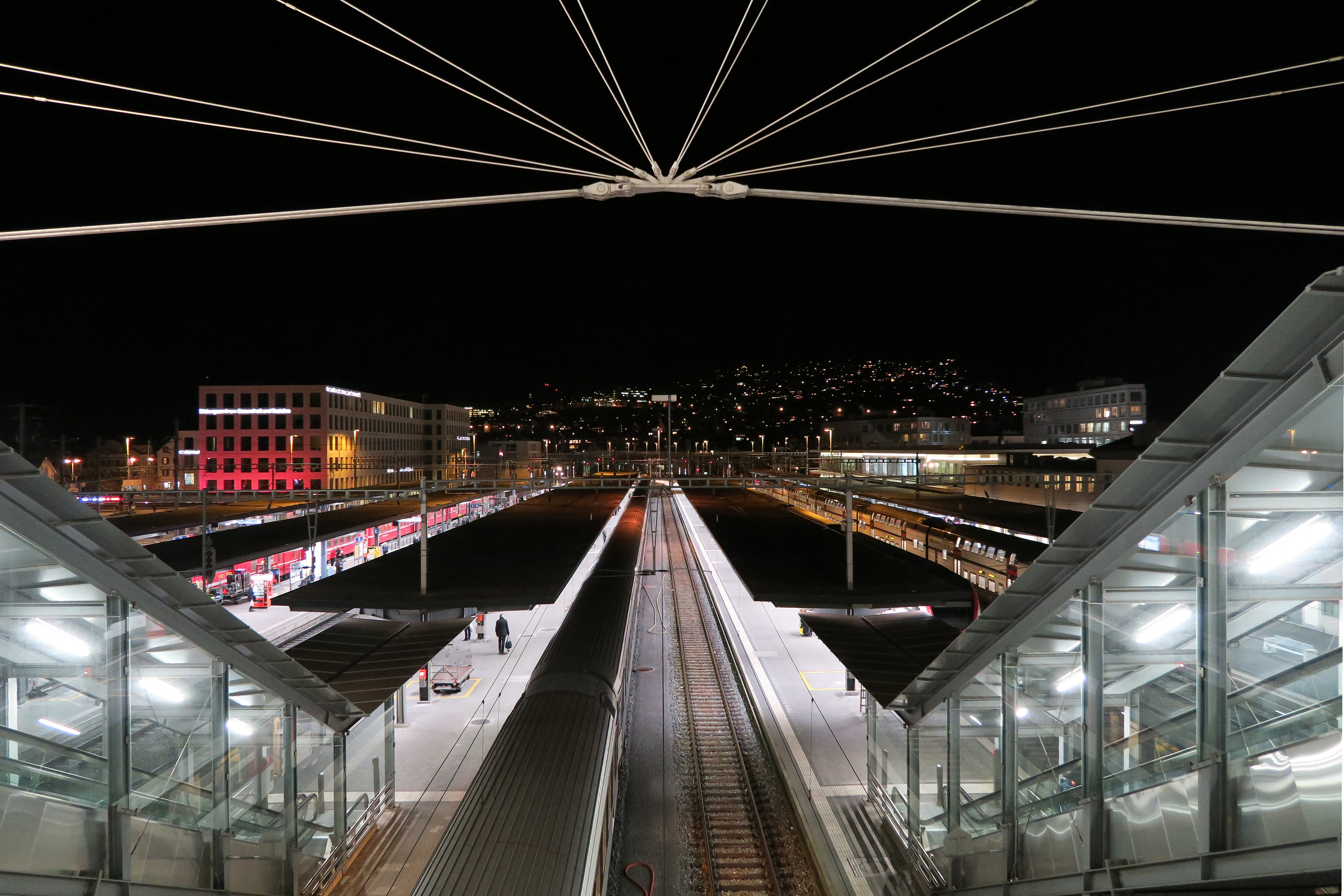
- Trains at Chur station

General information
- Location: Bahnhofplatz 1-2; Chur; Switzerland
- Coordinates: 46°51′11″N 9°31′44″E
- Elevation: 584 m (1,916 ft)
- Owner: Swiss Federal Railways; Rhaetian Railway
- Lines: Chur–Rorschach line; Landquart–Thusis line; Chur–Arosa line
- Distance: 13.7 km (8.5 mi) from Landquart; 25.7 km (16.0 mi) from Sargans
- Platforms: 6
- Tracks: 15
- Train operators: Südostbahn; Swiss Federal Railways; Thurbo; Rhaetian Railway; Glacier Express; Deutsche Bahn
- Connections: PostAuto Schweiz and Bus und Service buses

Construction
- Structure type: At-grade
- Platform levels: 2 (3 passenger levels)

Other information
- IATA code: ZDT

History
- Opened: 30 June 1858

Passengers
- 2025: 29,800 per day (RhB, SBB, SOB, Thurbo)
- Rank: 23 out of 1,095
Services
Preceding station	SBB CFF FFS	Following station
Landquart towards Basel SBB	IC 3	Terminus
Preceding station	Südostbahn	Following station
Landquart towards St. Gallen	IR 13 Alpenrhein-Express	Terminus
Landquart towards Bern	IR 35 Aare Linth	Terminus
Preceding station	DB Fernverkehr	Following station
Landquart towards Frankfurt (Main) Hbf	ICE 12	Terminus
Preceding station	Rhaetian Railway	Following station
Tiefencastel towards Tirano	Bernina Express	Terminus
Reichenau-Tamins towards St. Moritz	IR 38	Terminus
Trin towards Ilanz	RE 5	Terminus
Domat/Ems towards Disentis/Mustér	RE 7	Terminus
Domat/Ems towards Thusis	RE 8	Terminus
Terminus	RE 6	Chur Altstadt towards Arosa
Terminus	R 16	Chur Altstadt towards Arosa
Preceding station	Glacier Express	Following station
Disentis/Mustér towards Zermatt	Glacier Express	Reverses direction
Tiefencastel towards St. Moritz	Glacier Express	Reverses direction
Preceding station	St. Gallen S-Bahn	Following station
Landquart towards Sargans	S12	Terminus
Preceding station	Chur S-Bahn	Following station
Chur West towards Thusis	S1	Chur Wiesental towards Schiers
Chur West towards Rhäzüns	S2	Chur Wiesental towards Schiers
Location
- Location within Switzerland Location within Canton of Grisons

Chur railway station (German: Bahnhof Chur) serves the town of Chur, capital of the canton of Graubünden, Switzerland. Opened in 1858, it is the most important railway junction in Graubünden.

The station is the terminus of the Swiss Federal Railways (SBB CFF FFS) standard-gauge main line from Zürich, and is also one of the most important stations on the Rhaetian Railway (RhB) metre-gauge network.

Since 1986, the central Grisonian PostAuto/AutoDaPosta bus terminal has been located above it.

SBB InterCity, InterRegio, and RegioExpress services stop at the station, alongside Rhaetian Railway InterRegio, RegioExpress and Regio services. The station is also served by several Deutsche Bahn InterCity Express trains and by the Glacier Express. Finally, local service is provided by both the St. Gallen and Chur S-Bahn networks.

== History and development ==
=== 1850–1895 ===
Planning for a station at Chur began in 1850. After heated debate, the station was built at its present site, just outside the city limits, and designed as a terminus of the Rheineck–Chur railway. It was opened on 30 June 1858.

The first operator of the station was the United Swiss Railways. Initially, only a temporary wooden goods shed was constructed as a station building. But in 1860 work was completed on a station building still visible today in modified form. In 1876, that building was moved to a new location on the Gürtelstrasse, where it has remained ever since.

With continuing increases in tourism in the area, a new station building was completed on 1 November 1878. It still exists today, but over the years has undergone several modifications.

=== 1896–1985 ===
In 1896, the Rhaetian Railway opened a narrow gauge line between Landquart and Thusis. The first 13.68 kilometres (8.50 mi) of that line ran parallel with the already well established standard gauge line between Landquart and Chur.

Due to a ruling by the Swiss Federal Council, the Rhaetian Railway was forced to abandon plans for a railway station of its own in Chur, and instead had to integrate itself into the existing United Swiss Railways station.

In 1903, the Albula Railway was opened, making necessary another expansion of Chur station. In 1914, traffic at the station increased even further, with the opening of the Chur–Arosa railway. Between 1926 and 1928, following yet another sharp increase in traffic, the station was completely rebuilt. As part of the late 1920s renovation, the number of tracks was increased, new bridges were built, and the track layout was simplified. Simultaneously, buildings from earlier times were refurbished, and new buildings were erected.

=== 1985–present ===
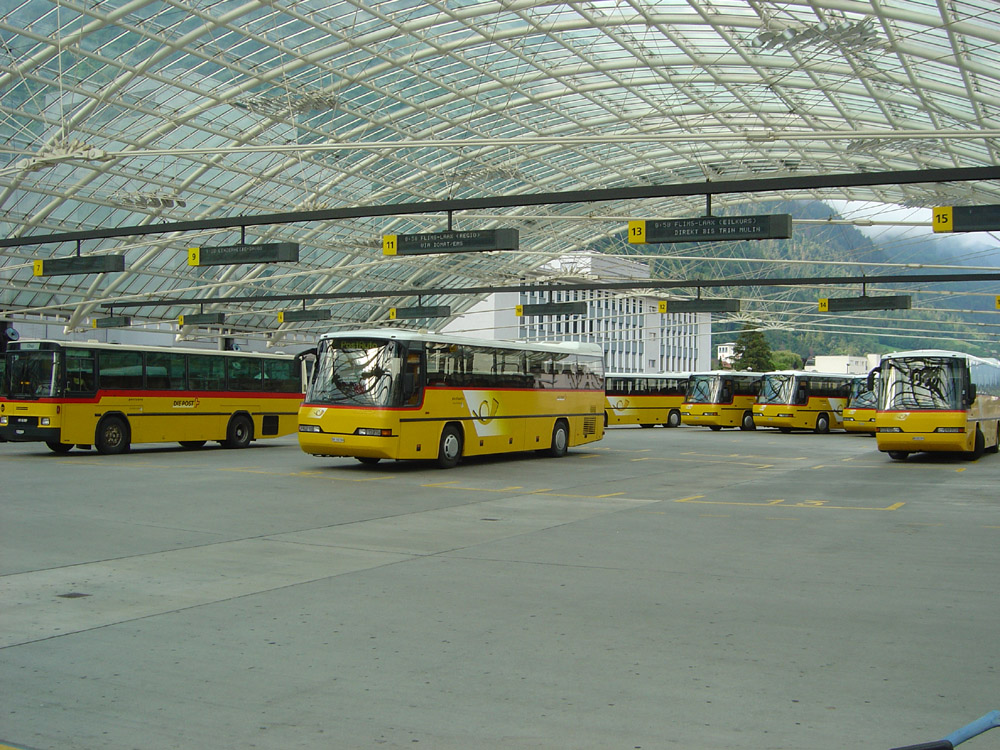
Bus terminal, on the upper level

The station is located in the centre of the town of Chur, and forms the transition between the old and new towns.

The most striking of the station's buildings is now the roof over the Postauto bus station, which is located above the station platforms.

In 1986, the architects Richard Brosi and Robert Obrist won first prize in a competition for the design of the bus station, including its roof. Their idea was to create an airy concourse, and the structure built to their design was completed in 1993.

Comprehensive redevelopment of the station began in 2000. The complete redesign of the station was a joint project of the SBB-CFF-FFS, the Rhaetian Railway and the town of Chur. As part of the redevelopment, a new pedestrian underpass was opened in 2003. By 2006, the underpass had been expanded to the south. As a connection to the southern end of the underpass, a new shopping mall was opened. Meanwhile, the height of the platforms was raised to Switzerland's usual height of 55 cm, and the platform roofs were renewed.

The old station building, which was called Belle Epoque, was completely renovated in a project completed in 2007. Between the tracks of the SBB and those of the Rhaetian Railway's Chur-Arosa line is now a new office and retail building.

The Chur bus station was moved closer to the railway station and has a direct connection to the underground shopping arcade. Also, the Bahnhofplatz in front of the station was extensively renovated in 2007.

== Arosabahn ==
Chur is also the lower terminus of the Chur-Arosa line (the Arosabahn), which has its own dedicated platforms (numbers 1 & 2) at the front of Chur station, on Bahnhofplatz.

== Services ==
As of the December 2025 timetable change, the following services stop at Chur:

- Intercity Express:
  - ICE/ECE 20 Four trains per day to Basel Badischer Bahnhof, Hamburg-Altona, Köln, or Frankfurt (Main).
- InterCity: half-hourly service to Zürich HB; some but not all trains continue to Basel SBB.
- Glacier Express: Several round-trips per day between Zermatt and St. Moritz.
- Bernina Express: Several round-trips per day to Tirano.
- InterRegio:
  - : hourly service to St. Gallen.
  - : hourly service to Bern via Zürich HB.
  - IR 38: hourly service to St. Moritz
- RegioExpress:
  - RE 5 / RE 7: half-hourly service to Ilanz and hourly service to Disentis/Mustér.
  - RE 6: three trains on weekends to Arosa
  - RE 8: hourly service to Thusis.
- Chur S-Bahn S1 / S2: half-hourly service between Rhäzüns and Schiers and hourly service to Thusis.
- St. Gallen S-Bahn S12: half-hourly service to Sargans.
- Regio: hourly service to Arosa.

== Other stations in Chur ==
There are three other railway stations in Chur:

- Chur Stadt (on the Chur-Arosa line)
- Chur West (towards Thusis)
- Chur Wiesental (towards Landquart)

== See also ==
- Rail transport in Switzerland
