= Rhäzüns railway station =

Railway station in Switzerland

Rhäzüns
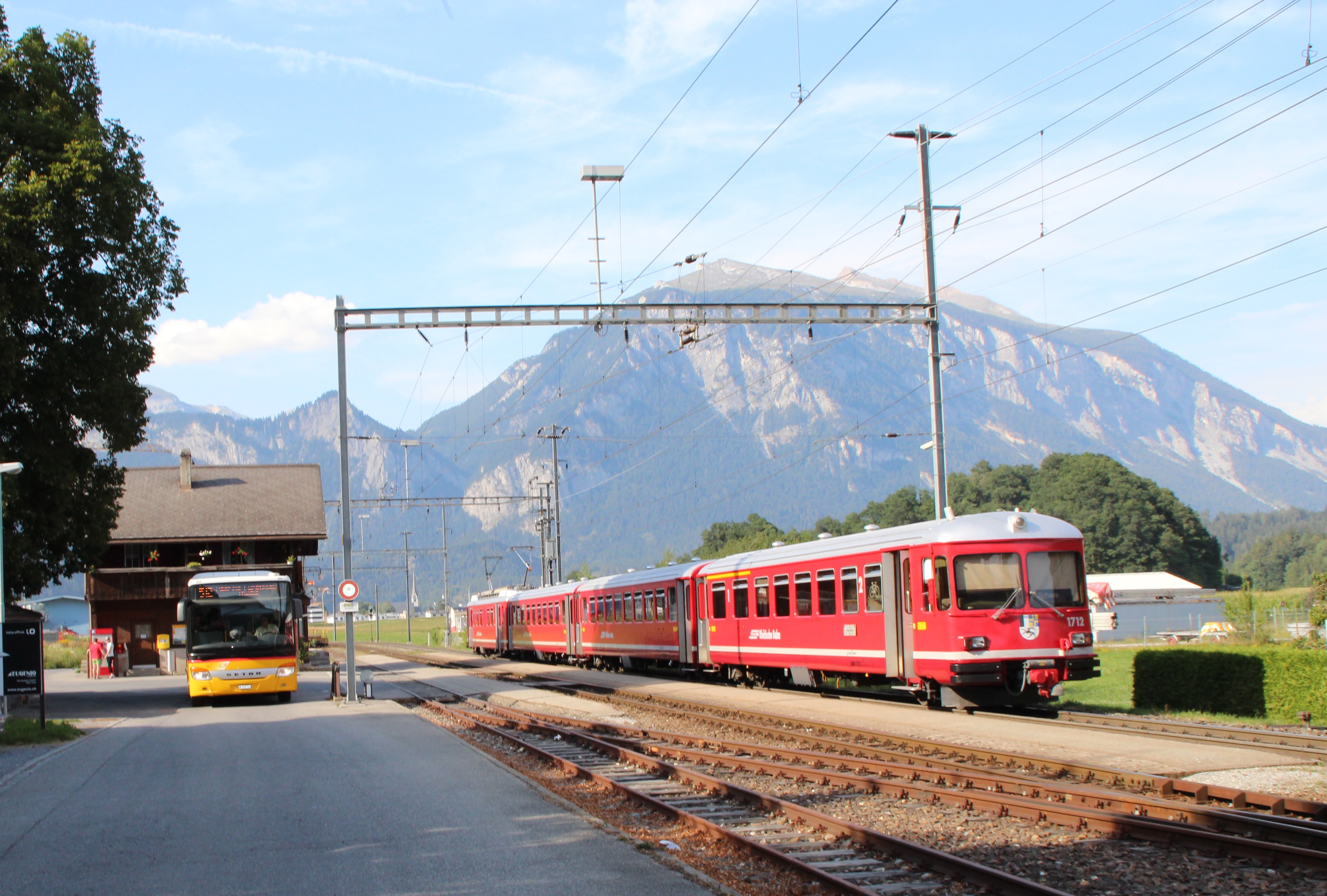
- A Rhaetian Railway train at the station in 2015

General information
- Location: Via dalla Staziun 11; Rhäzüns; Switzerland
- Coordinates: 46°47′59″N 9°23′57″E
- Elevation: 654 m (2,146 ft)
- Owner: Rhaetian Railway
- Line: Landquart–Thusis line
- Distance: 28.7 km (17.8 mi) from Landquart
- Train operators: Rhaetian Railway
- Connections: PostAuto Schweiz and Bus und Service buses

History
- Opened: 1 July 1896
- Electrified: 1 August 1921

Passengers
- 2018: 920 per weekday

Services
Preceding station	Rhaetian Railway	Following station
Thusis Terminus	RE 8	Bonaduz towards Chur
Preceding station	Chur S-Bahn	Following station
Rothenbrunnen towards Thusis	S1	Bonaduz towards Schiers
Terminus	S2	Bonaduz towards Schiers
Location

Rhäzüns railway station is a station in Rhäzüns, Switzerland. It is located on the 1,000 mm (3 ft 3 3/8 in) gauge Landquart–Thusis line of the Rhaetian Railway.

== Services ==
As of the December 2023 timetable change, the following services stop at Cazis:

- RegioExpress: hourly service between Thusis and Chur.
- Chur S-Bahn S1 / S2: hourly service to Thusis and half-hourly service to Schiers.
