= Landquart–Thusis railway line =

Railway line in Switzerland

Landquart–Thusis

Overview
- Owner: Rhaetian Railway
- Line number: 910, 940 and 941
- Termini: Landquart; Thusis

Technical
- Line length: 41.28 km (25.65 mi)
- Number of tracks: Double track from Chur to Reichenau-Tamins, remainder Single track
- Track gauge: 1,000 mm (3 ft 3 3/8 in) metre gauge
- Electrification: 11 kV 16.7 Hz AC overhead catenary
- Operating speed: 90 km/h (56 mph)
- Maximum incline: 2.5%

The Landquart–Thusis railway line is a Swiss metre-gauge railway line running from Landquart via Chur to Thusis. It is part of the Rhaetian Railway core network and provides a connection between the Landquart–Davos Platz railway and the Albula Railway. Between Landquart and Chur, the line runs largely parallel to the standard-gauge Chur–Rorschach railway of Swiss Federal Railways (SBB). The line from Chur to Thusis was opened in 1896.

== Description ==
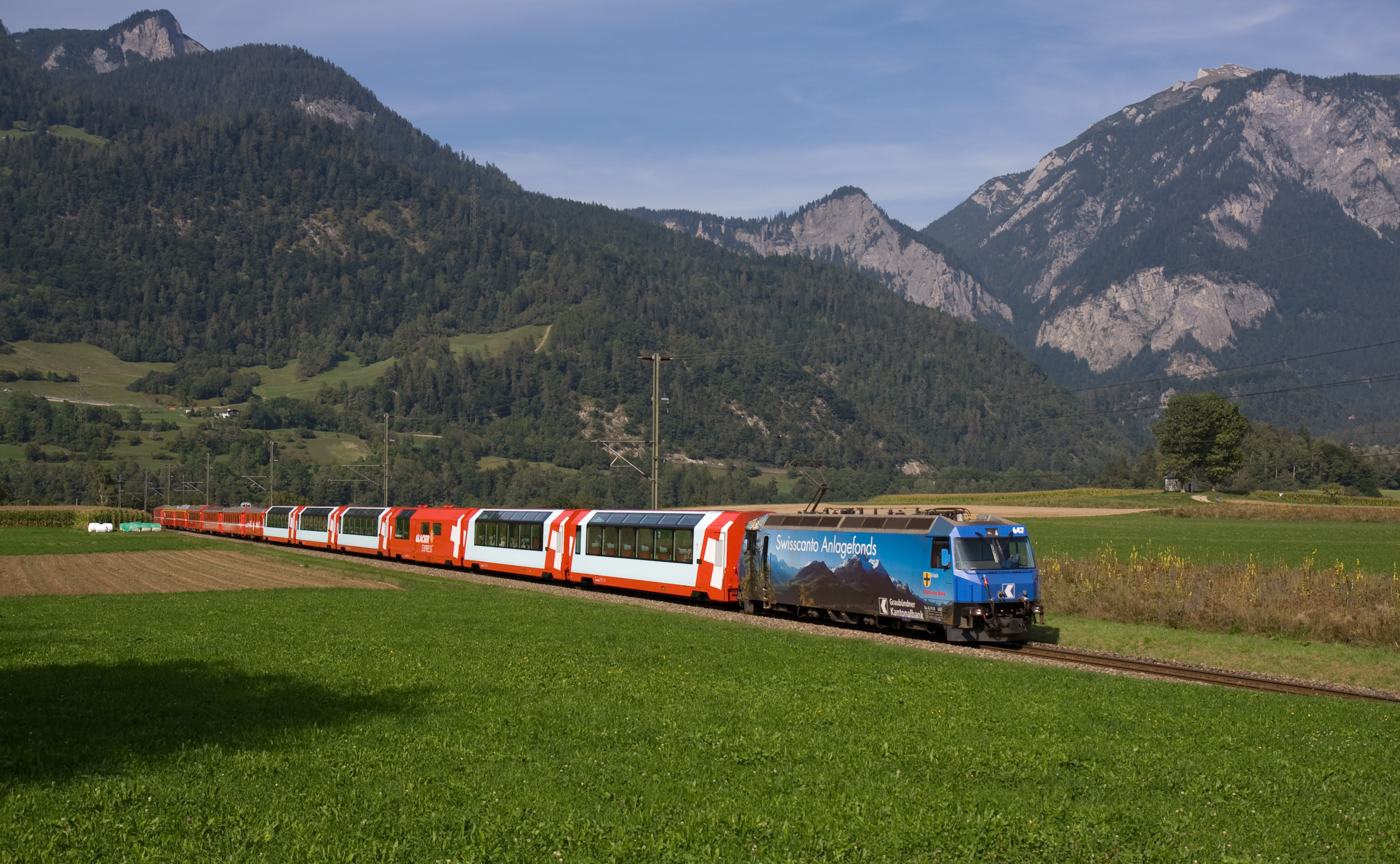
A Glacier Express coupled with a RegioExpress between Reichenau-Tamins and Bonaduz

Landquart station is the starting point of the Rhaetian Railway, historically part of the Landquart–Davos railway, operationally the location of the main workshop and network. It is kilometre 0 for the measurement of distances (chainage) on all core network lines.

While the passenger traffic of the SBB ends in Chur, there is a connection with the Arosa Railway and there is a link for standard gauge freight operations using a dual gauge (three-rail) section in Untervaz and a dual gauge section (22.5 tonne axle load) for standard-gauge freight traffic from Chur to Domat/Ems for the factory premises of Ems-Chemie and the large sawmill of Mayr-Melnhof Swiss Timber AG. All rail infrastructure is metre-gauge from Domat/Ems. The line to Disentis/Mustér branches off in Reichenau-Tamins; this connects with the trunk line of the MGB and these lines are served by Glacier Express services running between Chur and Zermatt.

The line connects at Thusis directly with the Albula Railway, which continues the chainage from Landquart to St. Moritz and continues from Bever on the two branches of the Engadin line to Scuol-Tarasp and Pontresina.

Services at Trimmis station were discontinued at the timetable change on 10 December 2006. As a result, Untervaz station was renamed Untervaz-Trimmis, which reflects the uneven development of the municipality of Trimmis.
