= Chur S-Bahn =

Two S-Bahn-style regional rail services in Switzerland

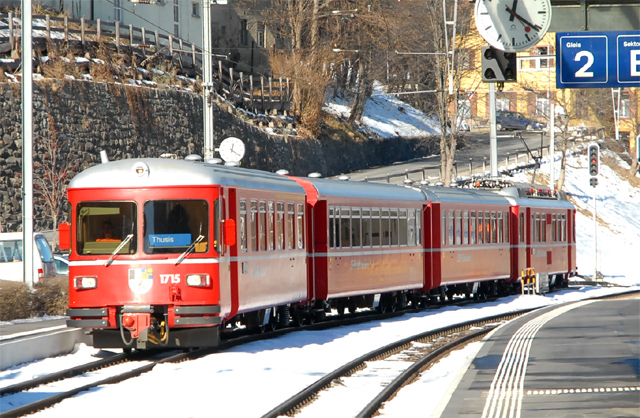
- A Chur S-Bahn composition at Thusis, 2007.

Overview
- Locale: Chur, Switzerland
- Transit type: S-Bahn
- Number of lines: 2
- Headquarters: Chur
- Website: Rhaetian Railway (in English)

Technical
- Track gauge: 1,000 mm (3 ft 3 3/8 in)
- Electrification: 11 kV 16,7 Hz ~
Chur S-Bahn
Chur S-Bahn

The expression Chur S-Bahn (German: S-Bahn Chur) is used to describe two S-Bahn-style regional rail services focused upon Chur, the capital of the canton of Graubünden, Switzerland. Both of these S-Bahn services run on metre gauge lines, and are operated by the Rhaetian Railway, which also runs the line from Chur to Arosa in similar fashion.

== History ==
Upon the 2005 timetable change, the Chur – Landquart and Thusis – Chur regional lines on the Landquart–Thusis railway were converted into S-Bahn lines. They were originally designated S8 and S9, respectively. The former line was also extended at both ends, to Rhäzüns and Schiers. Since 2009, the two lines have been designated S1 and S2, respectively.

== Lines ==
The following lines are the ones currently in service:

- S 1 Rhäzüns – Reichenau-Tamins – Chur West – Chur – Landquart – Schiers
- S 2 Thusis – Rhäzüns – Reichenau-Tamins – Chur
- R Chur – Arosa

Each of the S-Bahn lines operates at hourly intervals. Where they overlap, between Rhäzüns and Chur, the service intervals are 20 minutes / 40 minutes.

== Future ==
There are proposals to add to the Chur S-Bahn network the Ziegelbrücke – Sargans – Landquart – Chur regional line, which is operated by the SBB-CFF-FFS, and also to shorten its service intervals to a train every thirty minutes. Additionally, this line is proposed to be extended to Ems Werk via SBB-CFF-FFS / RhB dual gauge track.

== See also ==
- Bernina Express
- Glacier Express
