= Thusis railway station =

Railway station in Switzerland

Thusis
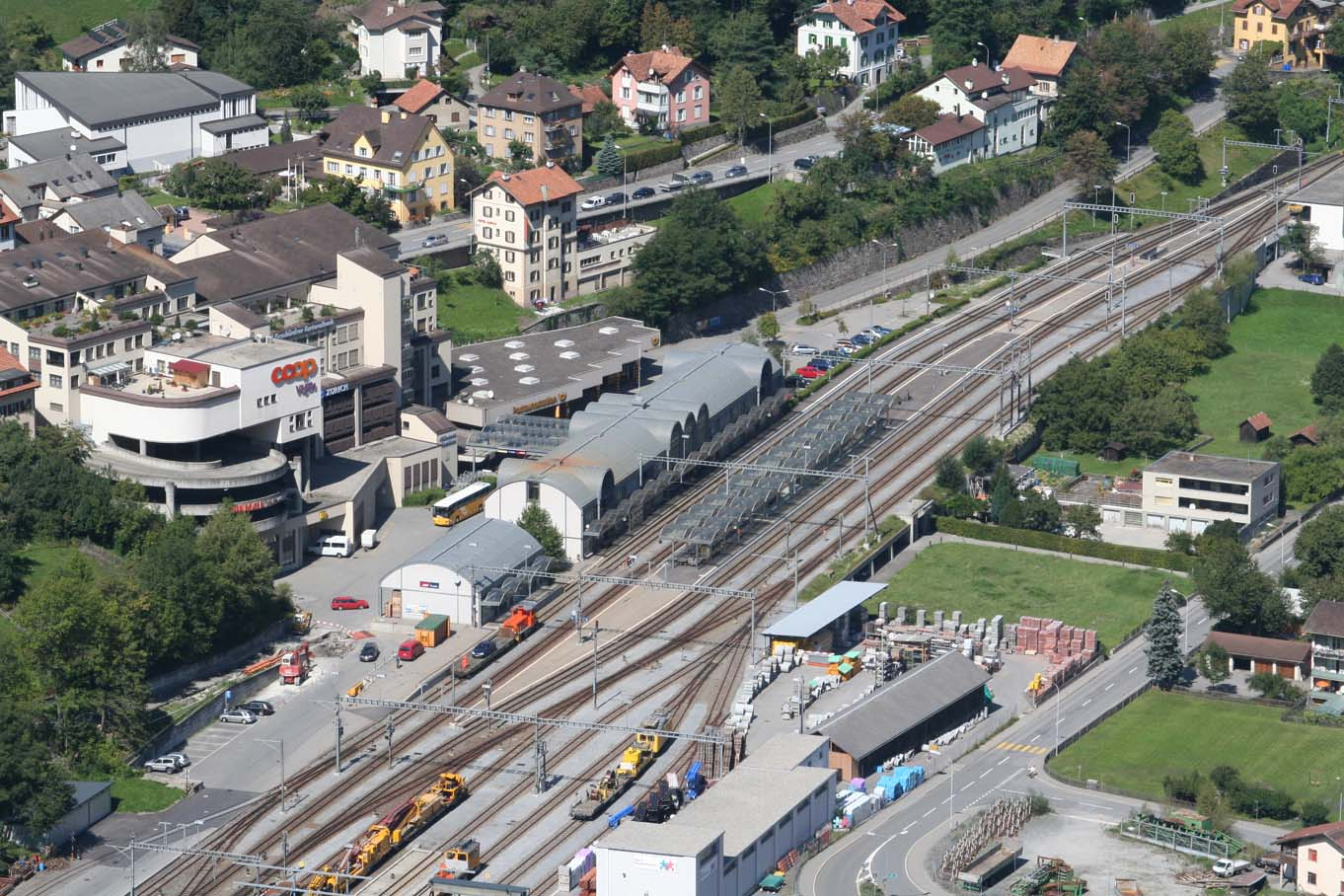
- Aerial view of the station in 2007

General information
- Location: Marktwiesenstrasse; Thusis; Switzerland
- Coordinates: 46°41′54″N 9°26′26″E
- Elevation: 696 m (2,283 ft)
- Owner: Rhaetian Railway
- Lines: Albula line; Landquart–Thusis line
- Distance: 41.3 km (25.7 mi) from Landquart
- Train operators: Rhaetian Railway
- Connections: PostAuto Schweiz buses

History
- Opened: 1 July 1896
- Electrified: 15 October 1919

Passengers
- 2018: 1,900 per weekday

Services
Preceding station	Rhaetian Railway	Following station
Tiefencastel towards St. Moritz	IR 38	Reichenau-Tamins towards Chur
Terminus	RE 8	Rhäzüns towards Chur
Preceding station	Chur S-Bahn	Following station
Terminus	S1	Cazis towards Schiers
Location

Thusis railway station is a railway station in Thusis, Switzerland. It is the junction of the Albula and Landquart–Thusis lines of the Rhaetian Railway. The renovated railway station was inaugurated in 1995 and is adorned with three bronze sculptures of Robert Indermaur, a “Sitting Lady waiting for the train", "An elder man waving" and "A young man rushing towards the station".

== Services ==
As of the December 2023 timetable change, the following services stop at Thusis:

- InterRegio: hourly service between Chur and St. Moritz.
- RegioExpress: hourly service to Chur.
- Chur S-Bahn S1: hourly service to Schiers.

== Gallery ==
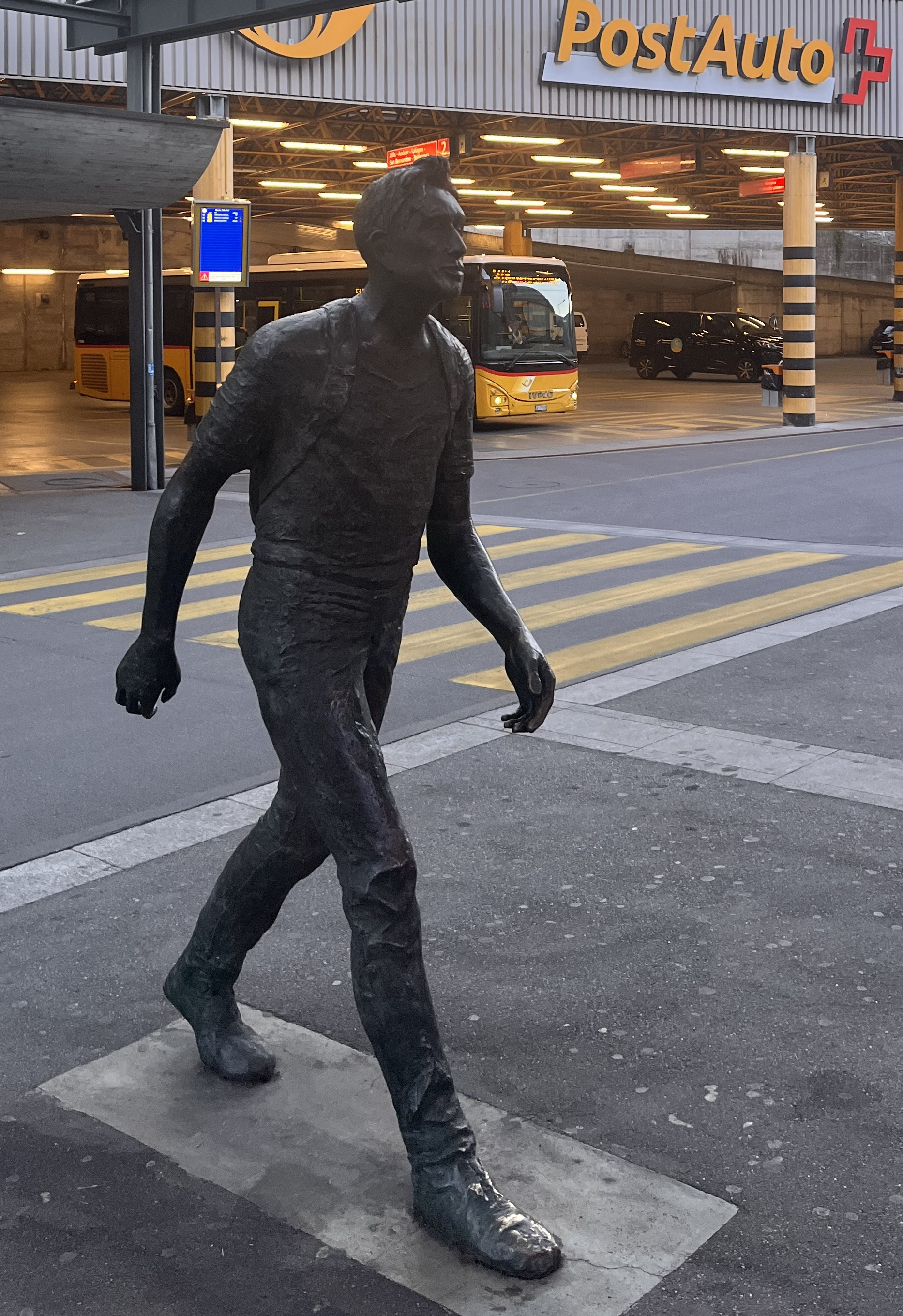

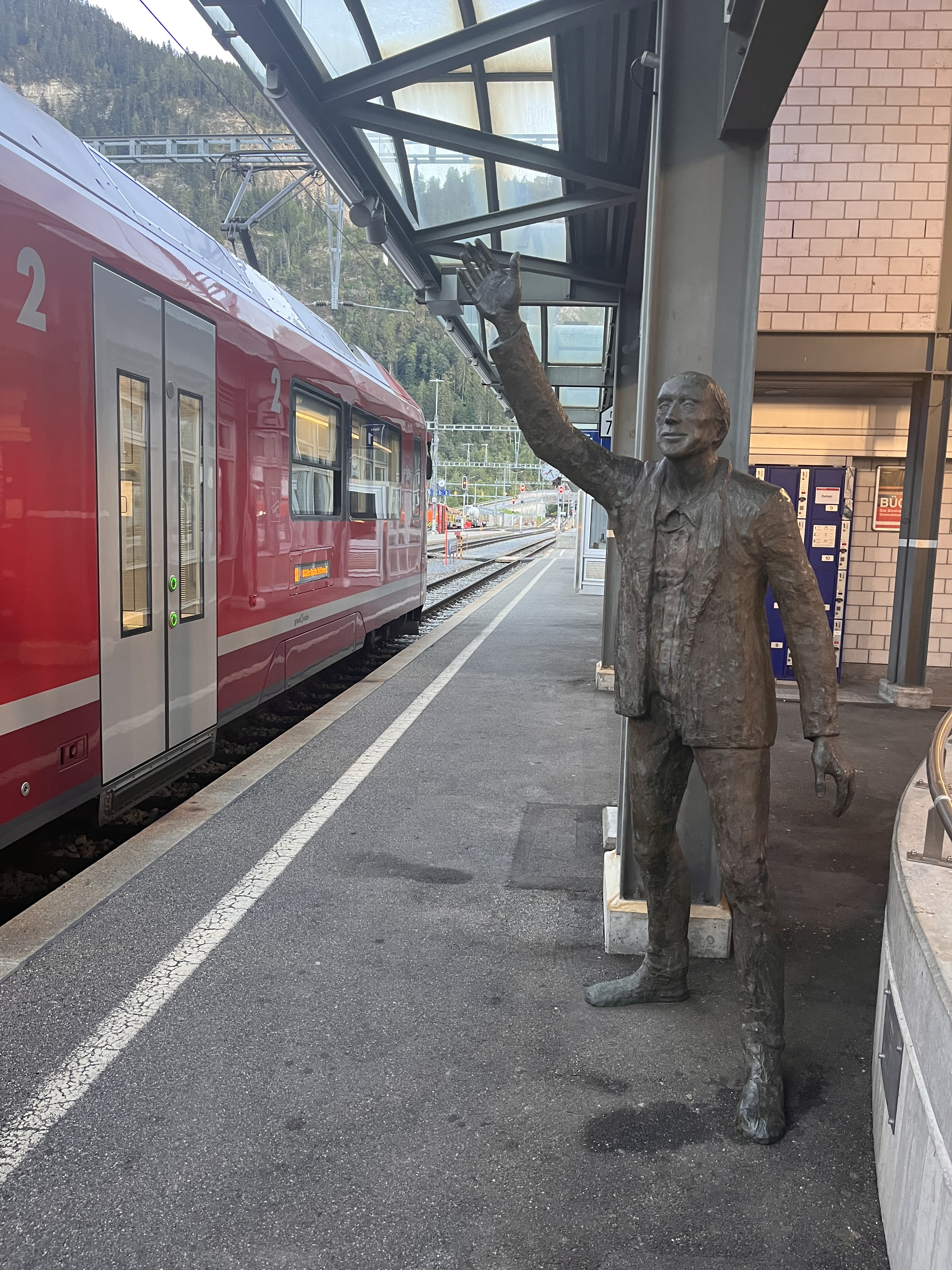
Man waving

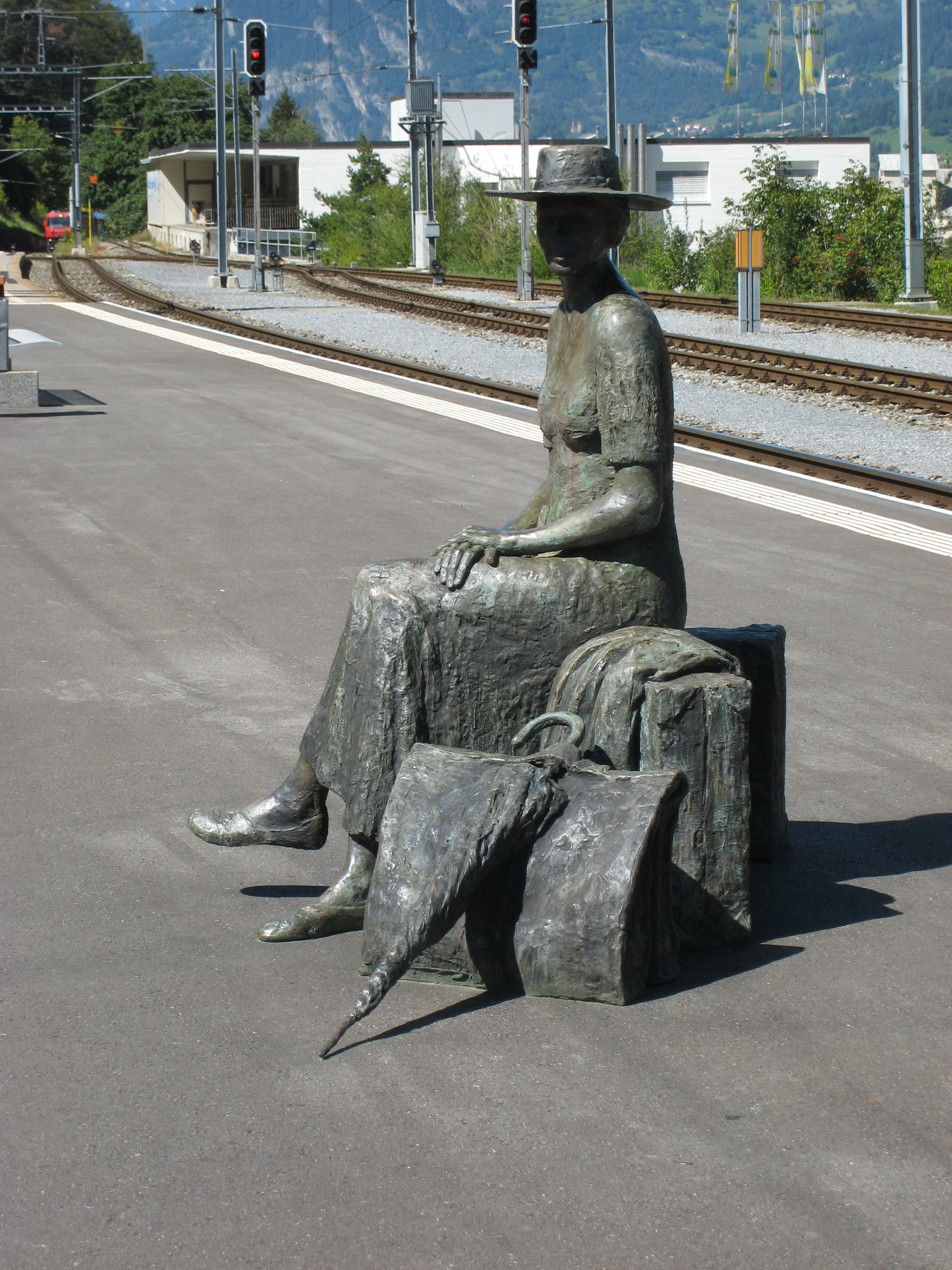
Lady waiting at the train station
