= Landquart railway station =

Railway station in canton of Grisons, Switzerland

Landquart
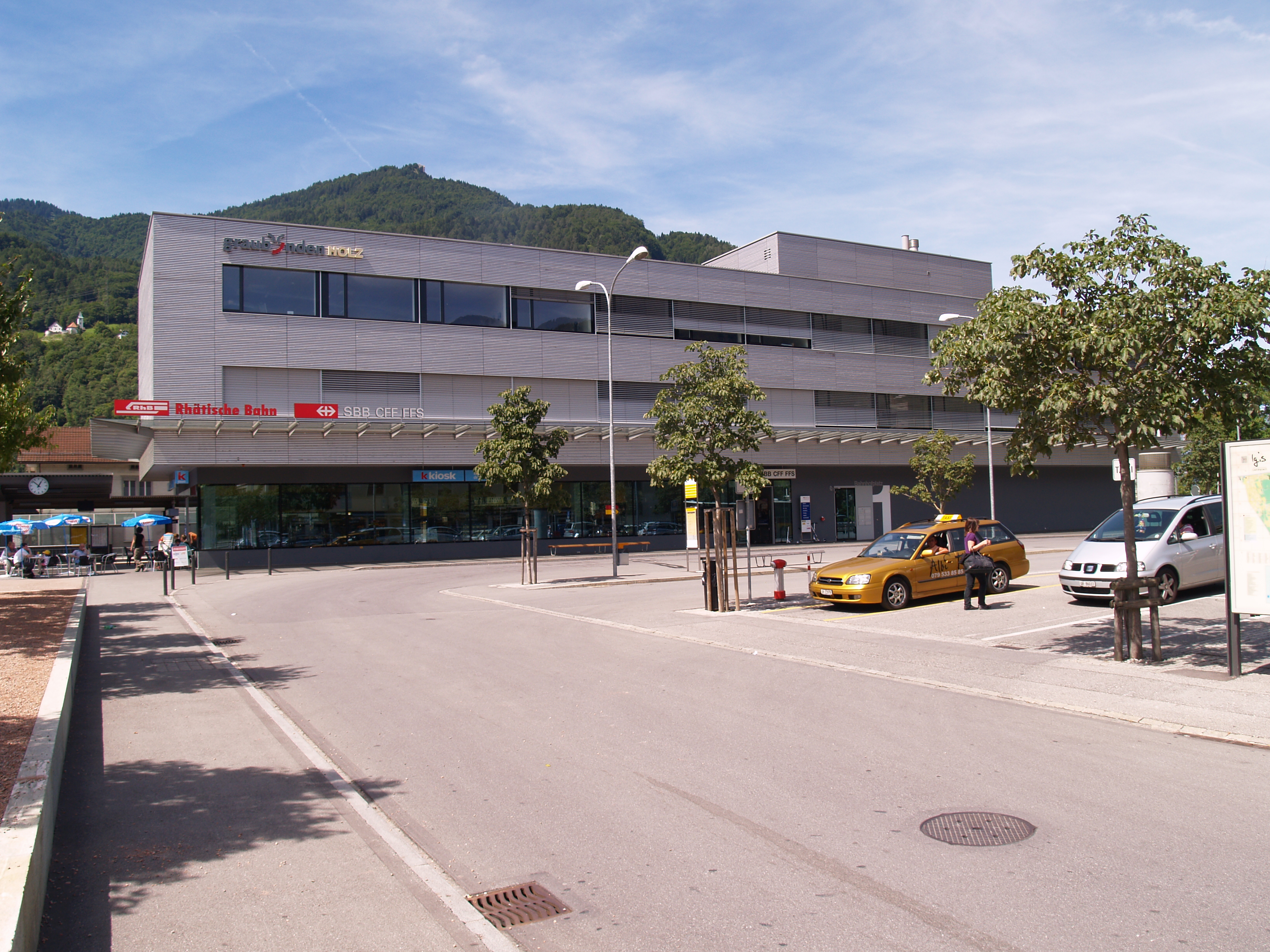
- Landquart station building

General information
- Location: Bahnhofplatz 1 Landquart; Switzerland
- Coordinates: 46°58′03″N 9°33′14″E
- Elevation: 523 m (1,716 ft)
- Owner: Swiss Federal Railways; Rhaetian Railway
- Lines: Chur–Rorschach line; Landquart–Davos Platz line; Landquart–Thusis line
- Distance: 12.3 km (7.6 mi) from Sargans
- Platforms: 2 island platforms; 2 side platforms
- Tracks: 6
- Train operators: Rhaetian Railway; Thurbo; Südostbahn; Swiss Federal Railways
- Connections: PostAuto Schweiz buses

History
- Opened: 1858; 168 years ago

Passengers
- 2025: 19,300 per day (RhB, SBB, SOB, Thurbo)
- Rank: 41 out of 1,095

Services
Preceding station	SBB CFF FFS	Following station
Sargans towards Basel SBB	IC 3	Chur Terminus
Preceding station	Südostbahn	Following station
Maienfeld towards St. Gallen	IR 13 Alpenrhein-Express	Chur Terminus
Maienfeld towards Bern	IR 35 Aare Linth	Chur Terminus
Preceding station	Rhaetian Railway	Following station
Terminus	RE 13	Schiers towards Davos Platz or St. Moritz
Terminus	RE 24	Schiers towards Davos Platz or Scuol-Tarasp
Preceding station	DB Fernverkehr	Following station
Sargans towards Frankfurt (Main) Hbf	ICE 12	Chur Terminus
Preceding station	St. Gallen S-Bahn	Following station
Maienfeld towards Sargans	S12	Chur Terminus
Preceding station	Chur S-Bahn	Following station
Landquart Ried towards Thusis	S1	Malans towards Schiers
Landquart Ried towards Rhäzüns	S2	Malans towards Schiers
Location
- Location within Switzerland Location within Canton of Grisons

Landquart railway station (German: Bahnhof Landquart) is a major railway station in the municipality of Landquart, in the Swiss canton of Grisons. It is an intermediate stop on the Swiss Federal Railways Chur–Rorschach line and the junction of the Landquart–Davos Platz and Landquart–Thusis lines of the Rhaetian Railway. It is served by long-distance, local, and regional trains.

There are trains to Zürich and beyond in the north and services to Chur and Disentis/Mustér in the south. In addition, there are connecting services to Klosters, Davos and Scuol in the east.

There are currently six tracks in use at the station. Tracks 2, 3 and 4 are served by SBB and tracks 5, 6 and 8 are served by RhB.

Landquart station is the start of the Prättigauer Höhenweg, a multi-day hiking trail that leads to Klosters.

== Services ==
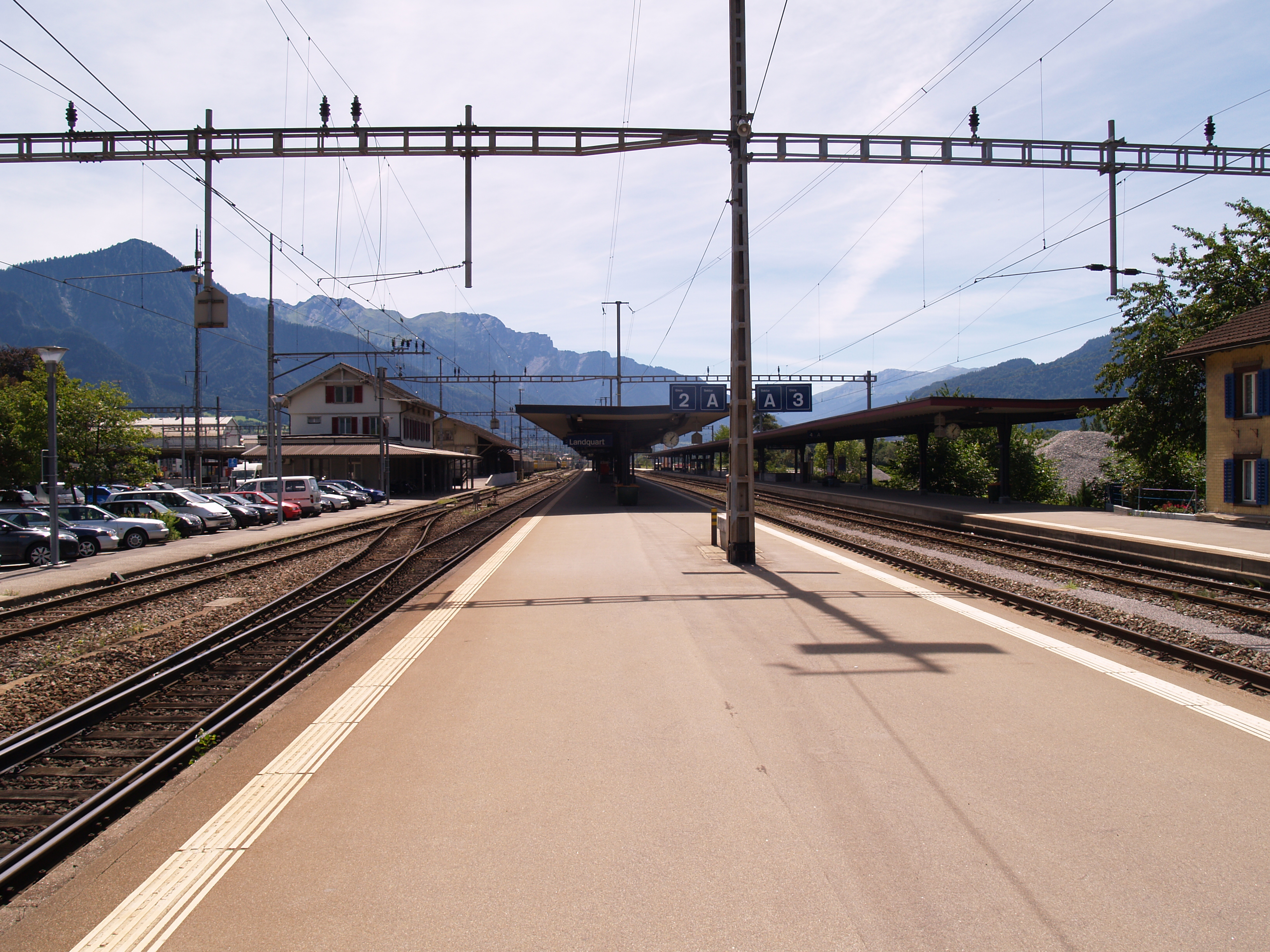
Platforms 1–4: Swiss Federal Railways platforms

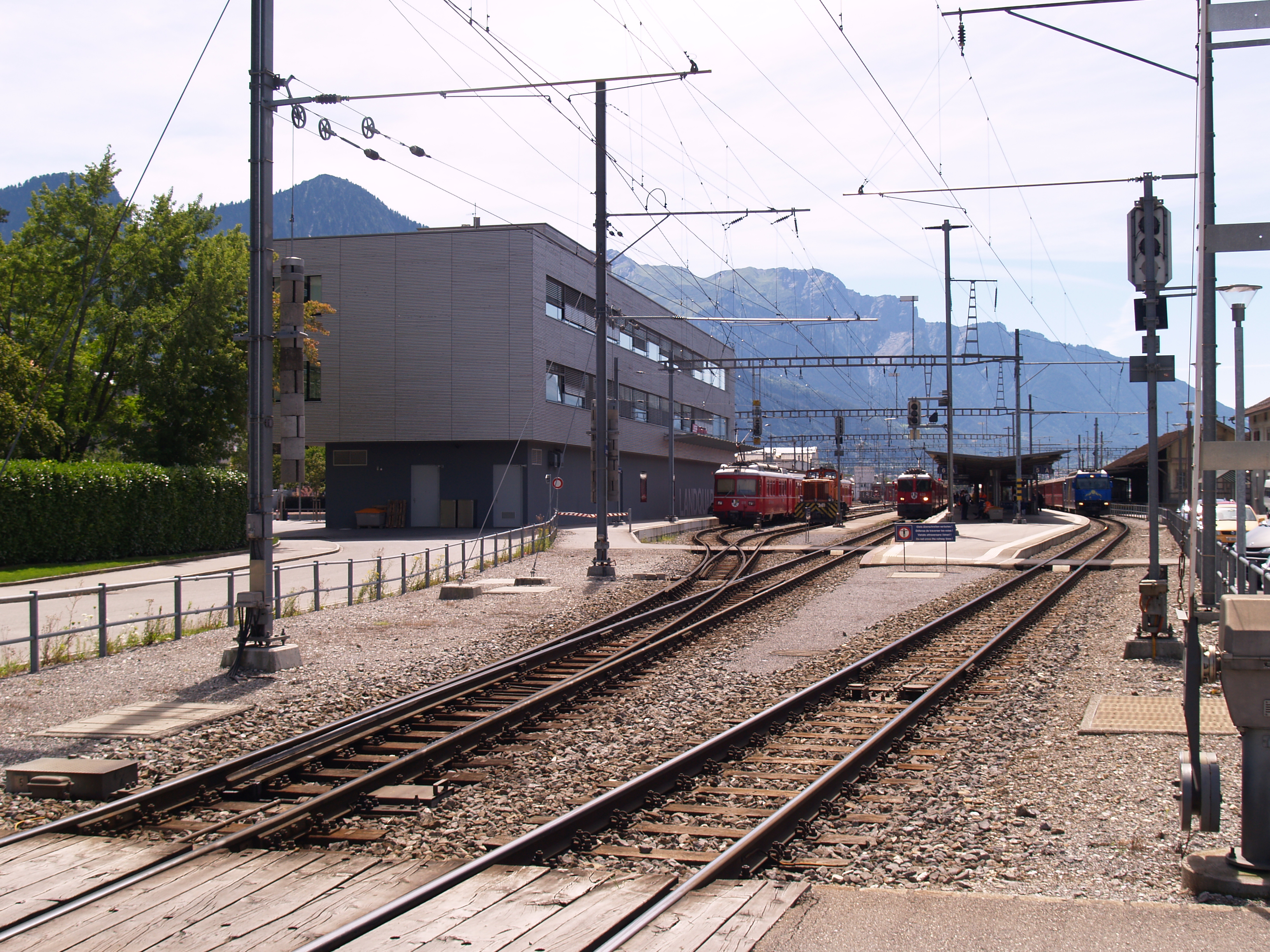
Platforms 5–8: Rhaetian Railway platforms

=== Long-distance ===
The following long-distance services call at Landquart:

- Intercity Express:
  - ICE/ECE 20 Two round-trips per day over the Chur–Rorschach line between Hamburg and Chur.
- InterCity:
  - Hourly service over the Chur–Rorschach line from Basel SBB or Zürich HB to Chur.

=== Regional ===
The following regional services call at Landquart:

- InterRegio:
  - Hourly service over the Chur–Rorschach line between Chur and St. Gallen.
  - Hourly service over the Chur–Rorschach line between Bern and Chur, via Zürich HB.
- RegioExpress:
  - RE 13/RE 24 Half-hourly service over the Landquart–Davos Platz line to Davos Platz and hourly service to St. Moritz and Scuol-Tarasp.

=== Local ===
Landquart is served by three S-Bahn lines:

- Chur S-Bahn S1 / S2: half-hourly service between Rhäzüns and Schiers and hourly service to Thusis.
- St. Gallen S-Bahn S12: half-hourly service over the Chur–Rorschach line between Sargans and Chur.

== See also ==
- Rail transport in Switzerland
