= Schiers railway station =

Railway station in Switzerland

Schiers
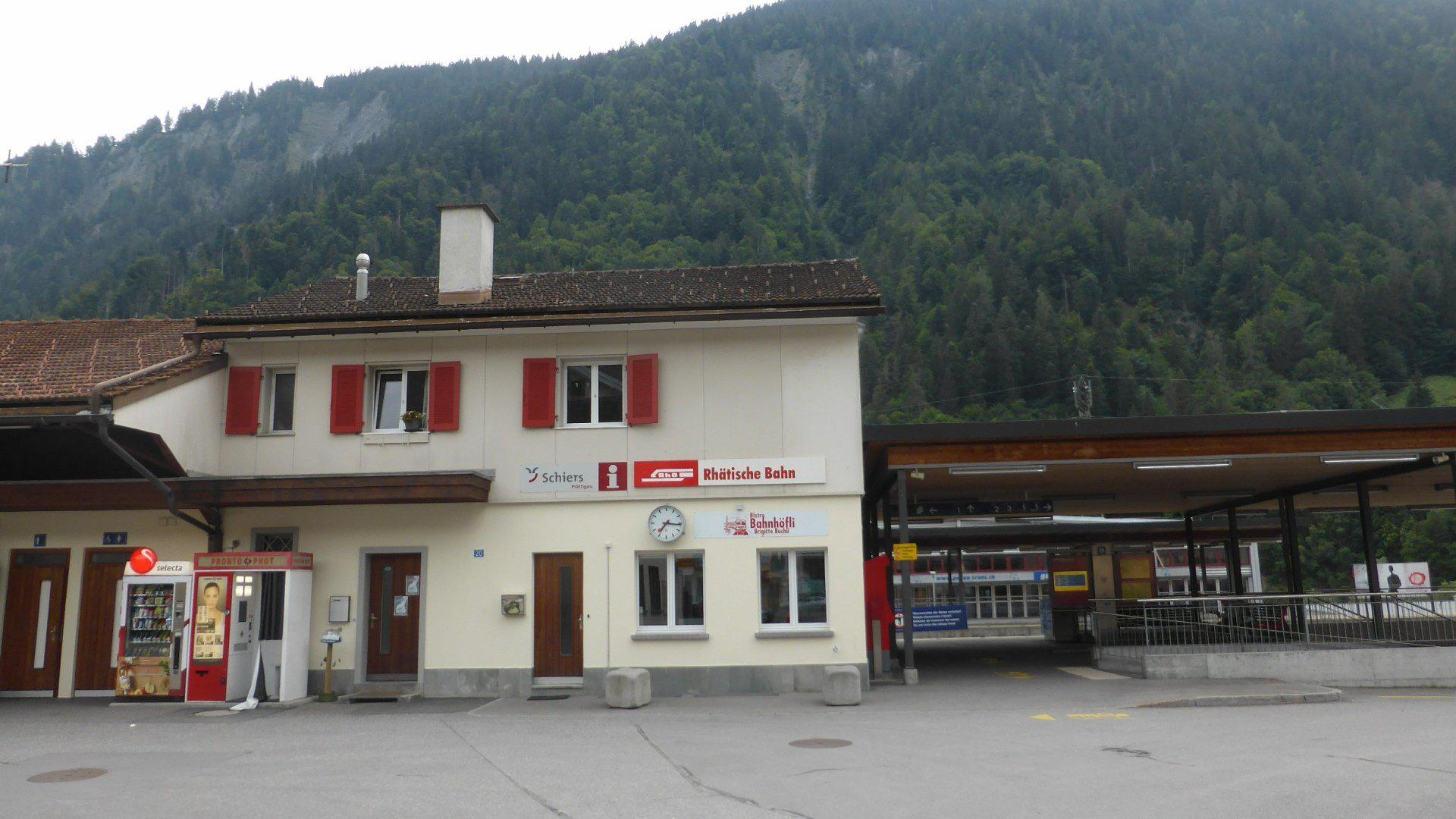
- The station building in 2018

General information
- Location: Bündtistrasse 128; Schiers; Switzerland
- Coordinates: 46°58′05″N 9°41′18″E
- Elevation: 654 m (2,146 ft)
- Owner: Rhaetian Railway
- Line: Landquart–Davos Platz line
- Distance: 11.5 km (7.1 mi) from Landquart
- Platforms: 2
- Train operators: Rhaetian Railway
- Connections: PostAuto Schweiz buses

History
- Opened: 9 October 1889; 136 years ago
- Electrified: 7 November 1921; 104 years ago

Passengers
- 2018: 1,600 per weekday

Services
Preceding station	Rhaetian Railway	Following station
Landquart Terminus	RE 13	Küblis towards Davos Platz or St. Moritz
Landquart Terminus	RE 24	Furna towards Davos Platz or Scuol-Tarasp
Preceding station	Chur S-Bahn	Following station
Grüsch towards Thusis	S1	Terminus
Grüsch towards Rhäzüns	S2	Terminus
Location

Schiers railway station (German: Bahnhof Schiers) is a railway station in the municipality of Schiers, in the Swiss canton of Grisons. It is an intermediate stop on the Rhaetian Railway 1,000 mm (3 ft 3 3/8 in) metre gauge Landquart–Davos Platz line.

== Services ==
As of the December 2023 timetable change, the following services stop at Schiers:

- RegioExpress: half-hourly service between Landquart and Davos Platz and hourly service to St. Moritz and Scuol-Tarasp.
- Chur S-Bahn: S1 / S2: half-hourly service to Rhäzüns and hourly service to Thusis.
