= Punt dal Gall Dam =

Punt dal Gall
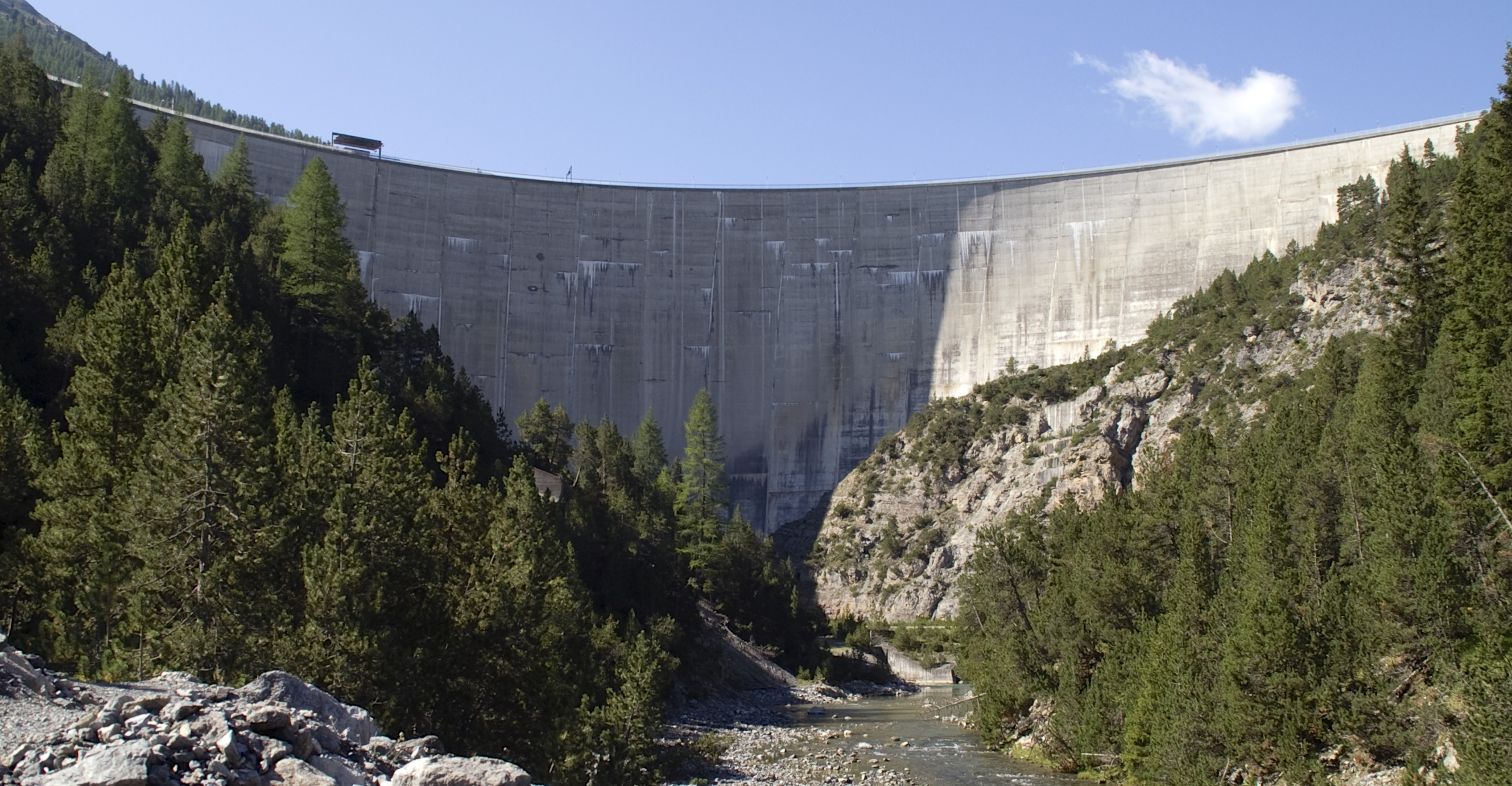
- Interactive map of Punt dal Gall
- Official name: Punt dal Gall
- Location: Italy-Lombardy/Switzerland-Grisons
- Coordinates: 46°37′28″N 10°11′45″E
- Opening date: 1968
- Operators: Ouvras Electricas d'Engiadina, Zernez

Dam and spillways
- Height: 426.5 ft (130 m)
- Length: 1771.6 ft (540 m)

Reservoir
- Creates: Lago di Livigno

Punt dal Gall is an arch dam located in Livigno valley, 10.5 km northeast of the Italian town of Livigno. It lies at the border between the Italian region of Lombardy and the Swiss canton of Grisons.

As of June 2008, the dam's crown road holds a toll that takes payment for crossing the Munt La Schera Tunnel, which connects Livigno and the Engadin valley.

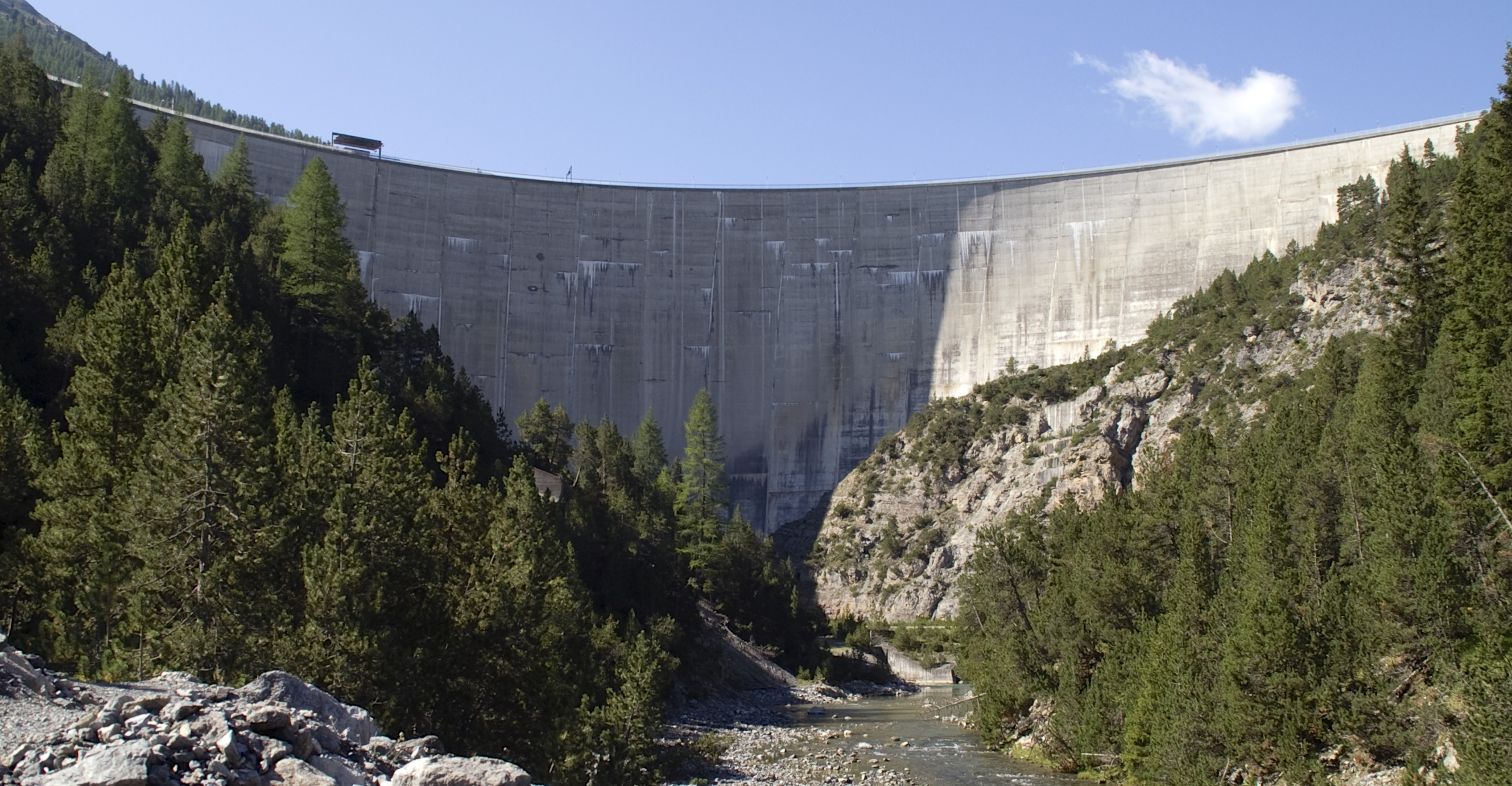
Punt dal Gall
