= Muzeum Susch =

Contemporary art museum in the Swiss Alps

Coordinates: 46°45′02″N 10°04′53″E

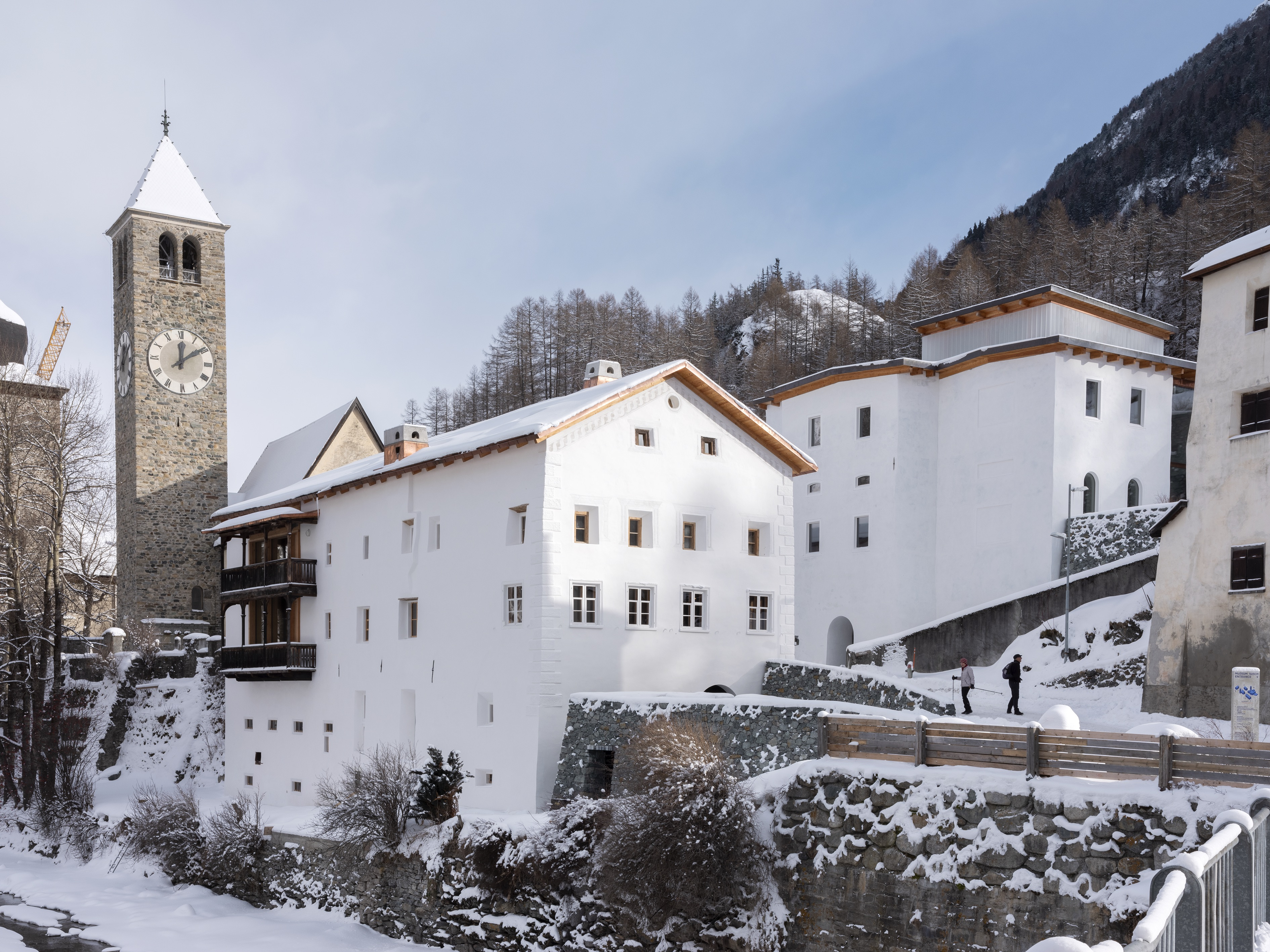
- Muzeum Susch in winter, 2019
- Interactive fullscreen map
- Established: 2 January 2019
- Location: Susch, Switzerland
- Type: Art museum
- Website: muzeumsusch.ch

Muzeum Susch is a private art museum located in the town of Susch, Switzerland, which focuses on collecting and promoting the work of women modern and contemporary artists. Founded by the Polish entrepreneur and art collector Grażyna Kulczyk, Muzeum Susch opened on January 2, 2019. Its name uses the original Polish spelling of the word museum.

== Location ==
With a population of just over 200 people, Susch is 1438 meters (4,718 feet) above sea level, in the Lower Engadine valley, in the canton of Graubünden, Switzerland. The Lower Engadine valley contains towns such as St. Moritz and Davos. The museum can be easily accessed via the Swiss Federal Railways; the nearest railway station is Susch, 350 meters away.

== History ==
=== Monastery ===
The buildings that make up Muzeum Susch were part of a rural monastery founded in 1157. The monastery was on the pilgrims' path to Rome and Santiago de Compostela called Jacob's trail. The buildings consisted of a vicarage, hospice and economic building. In the 19th century a brewery building was added.

=== Redevelopment ===
Grażyna Kulczyk acquired the museum building and three other old Engadine houses on the same street and commissioned the architect duo Chasper Schmidlin and Lukas Voellmy to develop the Muzeum Susch project from the complex. Since all buildings are under cantonal monument protection, an extension of the exhibition space was only possible inside the mountain, while the existing structures were subtly restored and recombined. In the first construction phase, 9000 tons of rock were blasted out, and the cavernous rooms in the mountain were designed. The raw stone was left in some rooms, making it possible to experience the mountain's insides; in one room, you can see how spring water emerges from the rock. The amphibolite rock was blown up, ground up and reused as polished floor covering. Other floors are made of local stone pine, pebbles from the Inn or limestone slabs used in the previous buildings. The renovation took three years. Today, the exhibition area covers 1500 square meters on four floors in around twenty rooms arranged like a labyrinth and differently designed.

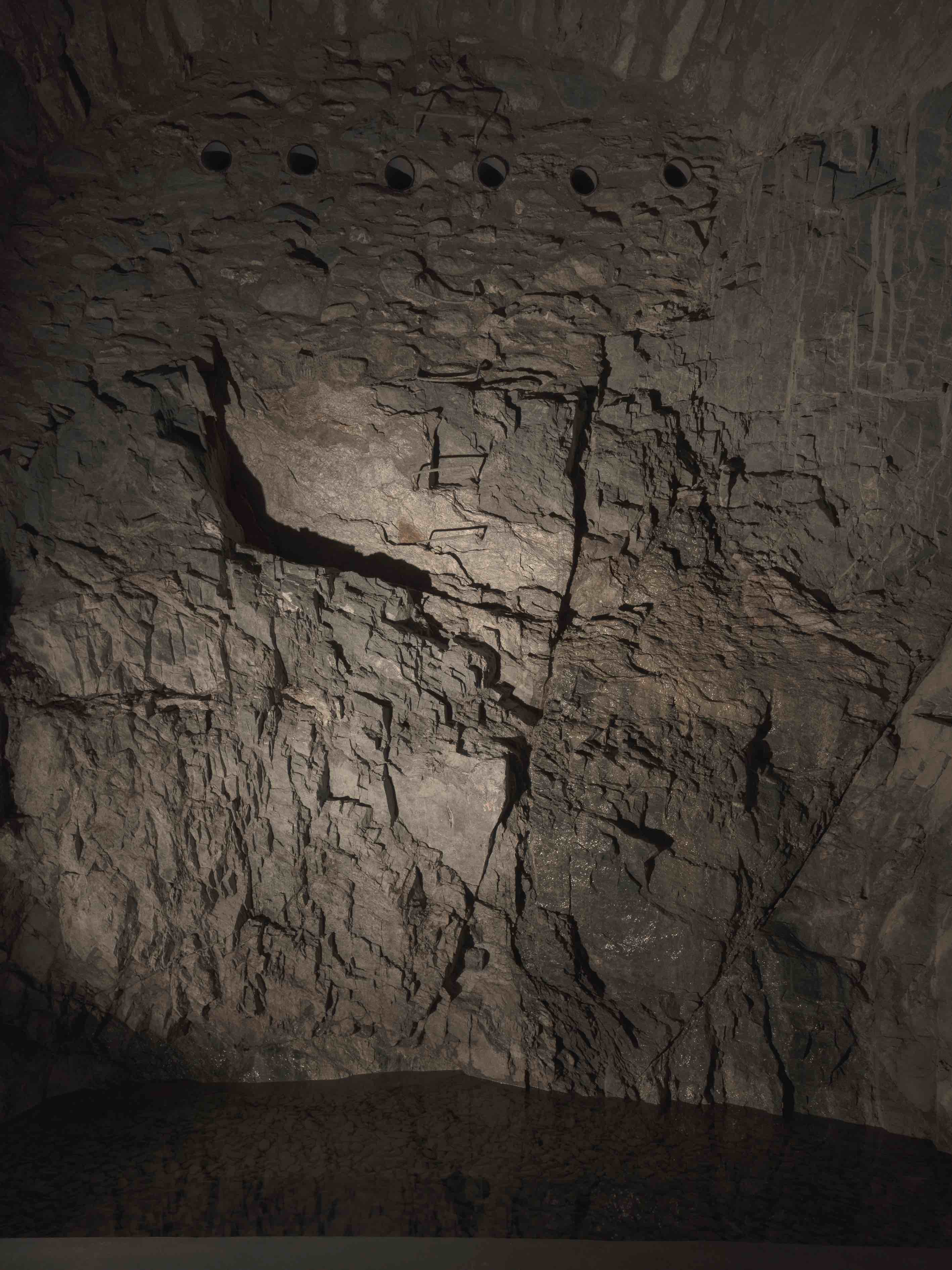
Rock wall with spring water emerging inside Muzeum Susch

=== Opening ===
The gallery opened on 2 January 2019.

== Building and exhibition space ==
The whole museum complex consists of four buildings: the Bieraria (brewery), the Bieraria Veglia (old brewery), the Chasa Della Santa (House of Health) and the Artist House. The entrance to the Museum is through the basement of the Bieraria. The Bieraria Veglia is accessed through a pre-existing underground passage, where exhibition space and the headquarters of the Muzeum Susch/Art Stations Foundation CH are housed.

The space draws a connection to nature, and was built to encourage an exploratory, slow art journey introducing spaces for exhibitions and experimental presentations, performances, conferences, lectures and events, as well as an interdisciplinary residency programme.

In summer, terraced gardens designed by landscape architect Günther Vogt can be accessed from the exhibition rooms.

== Exhibition ==
The exhibits inside the building consist of permanent installations and seasonal exhibitions.

=== Permanent site-specific installations ===
Muzeum Susch consists of a series of permanent, site-specific installations by international contemporary artists. The installations engage with the architecture and the characteristic structure.

Each of the permanent installations plays a part in shaping the evolving character and distinctive layout of the space, inviting a unique sense of choreography with temporary works on display that will occupy most of the building space. Monika Sosnowska’s 'Stairs' (2017), a 14m steel spinal column structure, was one of the first site-specific works to arrive at Muzeum Susch, and it sits in the former ice tower of the brewery.

Other permanent site-specific installations include: Narcissussusch (2018) by Mirosław Bałka, Midada da structura (2018) by Mirko Baselgia, Herrenzimmer (1977 – 1979) by Heidi Bucher, Piss Flowers (1991 – 1992) by Helen Chadwick, Dreams in Black I (1992) and Dreams in Black II (1994) by Izabella Gustowska, Flock I (1990) by Magdalena Abakanowicz, Ethnic Wars. Large Vanitas Still Life (1995/2017) by Zofia Kulik, Inn Reverse (2018) by Sara Masüger, Painkillers (2014 – 2017) by Joanna Rajkowska, Real Nazis (2017) & Untitled (Story of the Eye, 2013) by Piotr Uklański, From the Series The Theater of Disappearance XXXI (2018) by Adrián Villar Rojas, Tuor per Susch (Tower for Susch, 2020) by Not Vital, Myśliciel (The Thinker, 2016) by Paweł Althamer, You Heard Me Scream (2022) and There Was So Much More of Me (2019) by Tracey Emin, Corrida (1956 – 1960) by Xanti Schawinsky and Untitled (2015) by Heimo Zobernig.

=== Temporary exhibitions ===
Temporary exhibitions
| Date | Artist(s) | Title | Details |
|---|---|---|---|
| 2 January 2019 – 30 June 2019 | Carla Accardi, Evelyne Axell, Magdalena Abakanowicz, Helena Almeida, Ida Applebroog, Mirosław Bałka, Maria Bartuszová, Renate Bertlmann, Judith Bernstein, Louise Bourgeois, Geta Brătescu, Ellen Cantor, Dadamaino, Marlene Dumas, Nicole Eisenman, Wojciech Fangor, Lucio Fontana, Laura Grisi, Dorothy Iannone, Birgit Jürgenssen, Kiki Kogelnik, Maria Lassnig, Natalia LL, Sarah Lucas, Roman Ondak, Teresa Pągowska, Carol Rama, Erna Rosenstein, Iris von Roten, Carolee Schneemann, Joan Semmel, Alina Szapocznikow, Betty Tompkins, Julie Verhoeven, Hannah Wilke and Andrzej Wróblewski | A Woman Looking at Men Looking at Women | About |
| 27 July 2019 – 24 November 2019 | Emma Kunz | Visionary Drawings | About |
| 29 December 2019 – 19 July 2020 | Carolee Schneemann | Up to and Including Limits: After Carolee Schneemann | About |
| 1 August 2020 – 22 May 2021 | Evelyne Axell, Sylvie Fleury | Evelyne Axell: Body Double | About |
| 5 June 2021 – 5 December 2021 | Laura Grisi | Laura Grisi. The Measuring of Time | About |
| 18 December 2021 – 26 June 2022 | Feliza Bursztyn | Feliza Bursztyn: Welding Madness | About |
| 16 July 2022 – 4 December 2022 | Heidi Bucher | Heidi Bucher. Metamorphoses II | About |
| 4 January 2023 – 2 July 2023 | Hannah Villiger, Alexandra Bachzetsis, Lou Masduraud, and Manon Wertenbroek | Hannah Villiger: Amaze Me | About |
| 15 July 2023 – 26 November 2023 | Wanda Czełkowska | Wanda Czełkowska: Art is not Rest | About |
| 3 January – 30 June 2024 | Anu Põder | Anu Põder: Space for My Body | About |
| 20 July – 3 November 2024 | Tapta | Tapta: Flexible Forms | About |
| 20 July 2024 – 11 May 2025 | Běla Kolářová & Emila Medková | Běla Kolářová & Emila Medková: Where No One Looked Before | About |
| 13 December 2024 – 11 May 2025 | Ilona Keserü | Ilona Keserü: Flow | About |
| 15 June – 2 November 2025 | Gabriele Stötzer | Gabriele Stötzer: with Hand & Foot, Skin & Hair | About |
| 15 June – 2 November 2025 | Jadwiga Maziarska | Jadwiga Maziarska: Assembly | About |
| 13 December 2025 – 24 May 2026 | Edita Schubert | Edita Schubert: Profusion | About |

== Other programmes ==
=== Acziun Susch ===
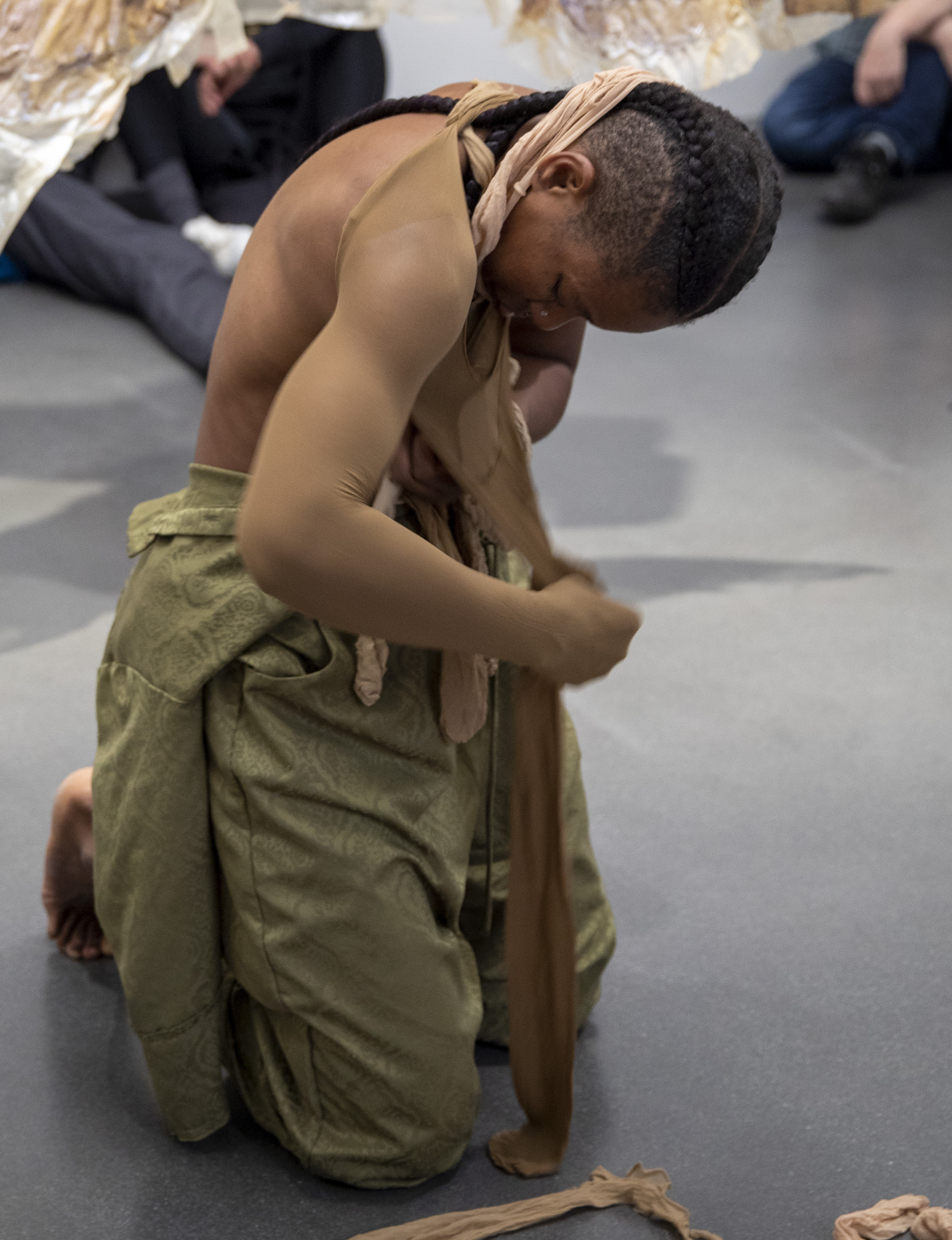
mayfield brooks performance as part of Acziun Suschk

Created and curated by Joanna Lesnierowska, Acziun Susch is a research and presentation platform bringing forward the art of choreography in dialogue with other disciplines and providing the dance community with a meeting point in the Swiss Alps.

The programme of research residencies combines space for reflection and individual practice with public rehearsals, workshops and lectures.

=== Magazine Susch ===
Annual Magazine Susch serving as an additional thought-provoking platform - Muzeum Susch/Acziun Susch supported publishing this book, offered Cools a residence to continue his research on laments in modern art, and commissioned a podcast on the subject for their 2020 series Echolot.

=== Echolot podcast ===
Echolot is a podcast in which creatives reflect on and the concepts of taking life at an intentionally slower pace with increased time for contemplation during their time at Muzeum Susch.

=== Instituto Susch ===
Continuing its activities since its launch in 2016, Instituto Susch began executing a long-term research programme in January 2023. It will be based on elaboration of the oeuvre of women artists from Central & Eastern Europe: Albania, Bosnia & Herzegovina, Bulgaria, Croatia, Czechia, Estonia, Hungary, Kosovo, Latvia, Lithuania, Poland, Romania, Serbia, Slovakia and Slovenia.

== Art Stations Foundation CH ==
Art station foundation is a foundation funded by Grażyna Kulczyk which supports the Muzeum. Since 2004 Art Stations Foundation by Grażyna Kulczyk has been providing extensive support to the development of contemporary choreography through its performative programme based in Poznań, recognized internationally under the name Stary Browar Nowy Taniec / Old Brewery New Dance.

== See also ==
- List of museums in the Grisons
- List of museums in Switzerland
