= Lai da Ova Spin =

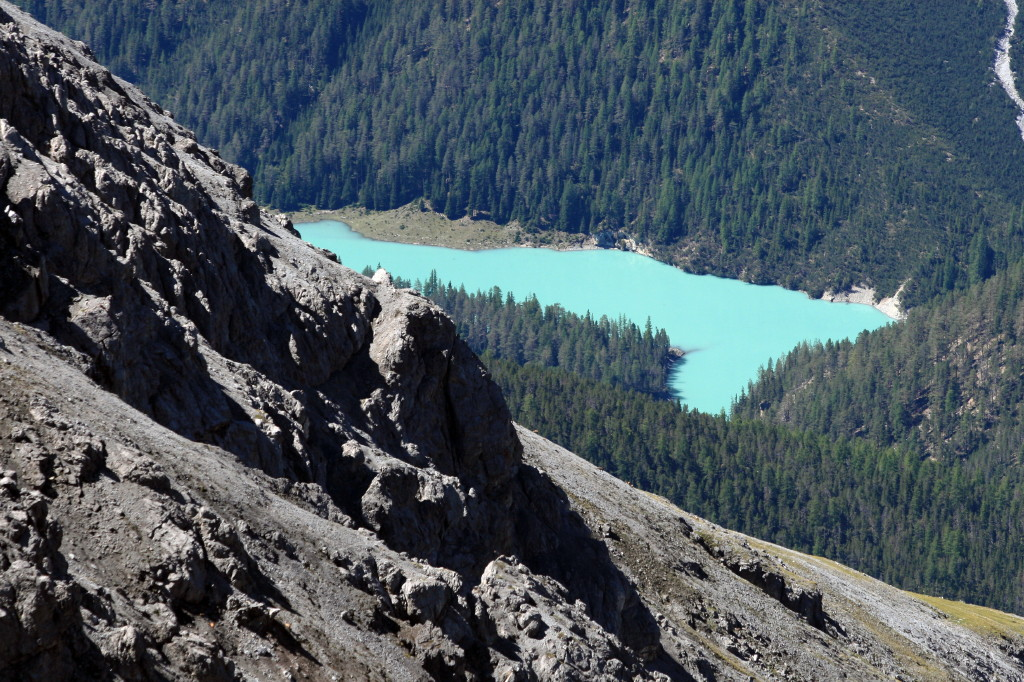

- Location within Canton of Graubünden Location within Switzerland Location within Italy Location within Alps
- Interactive map of Lai da Ova Spin
- Location: Zernez, Grisons
- Coordinates: 46°40′18″N 10°9′25″E
- Type: reservoir
- Primary inflows: Spöl
- Primary outflows: Spöl
- Catchment area: 385 km^{2} (149 sq mi)
- Basin countries: Switzerland
- Surface area: 0.34 km^{2} (0.13 sq mi)
- Water volume: 7.4 million cubic metres (6,000 acre⋅ft)
- Surface elevation: 1,630 m (5,350 ft)

Lai da Ova Spin is a compensation reservoir on the Spöl river at Zernez, Grisons, Switzerland. Its volume is 7.4 mio m³ and surface area 34 ha (84 acres).

The arch dam Ova Spin was completed in 1968 and has a height of 73 m.

== See also ==
- List of lakes of Switzerland
- List of mountain lakes of Switzerland
