= Munt la Schera Tunnel =

Road tunnel in Switzerland

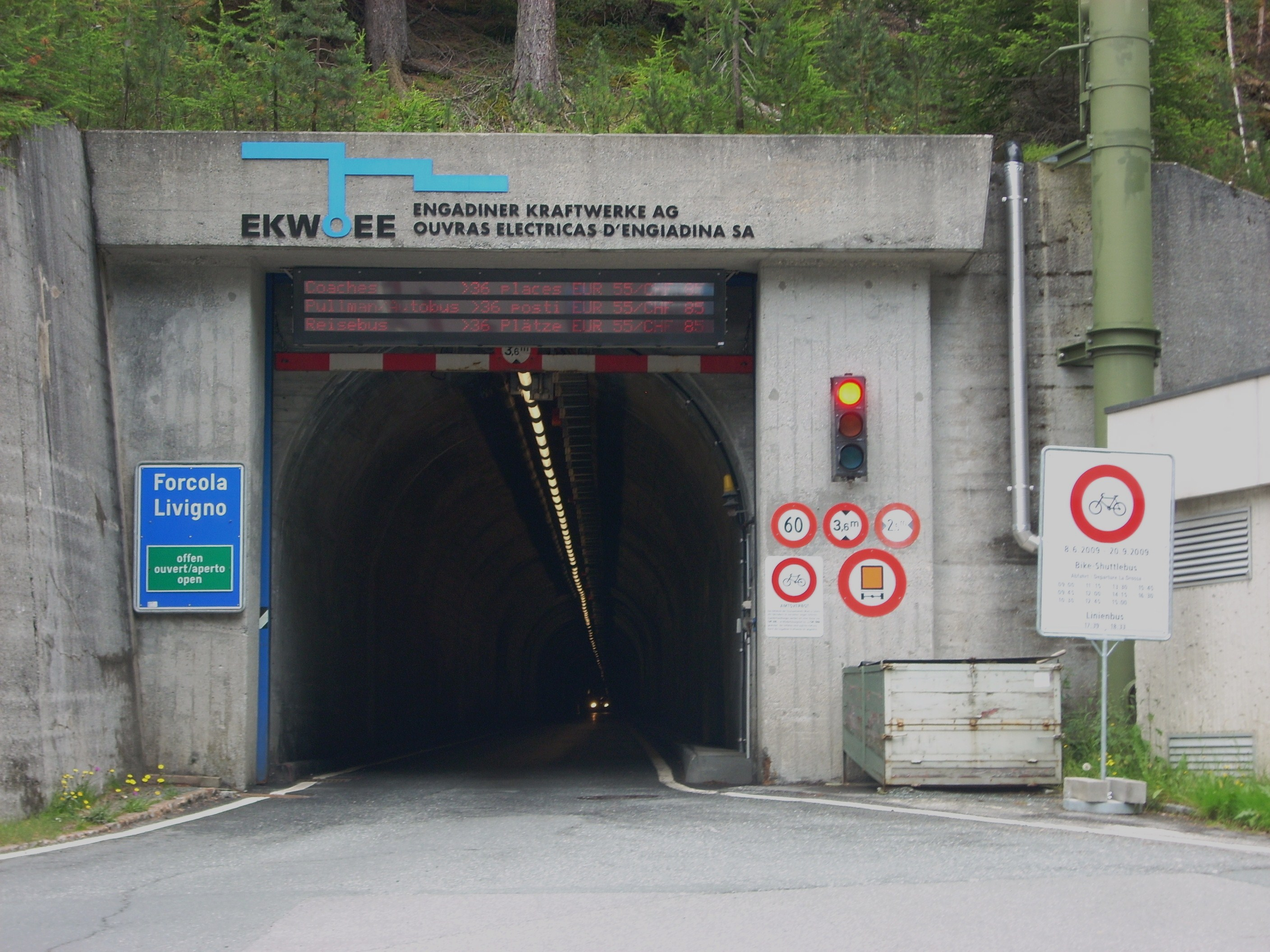
- Interactive map of Munt la Schera Tunnel

Overview
- Location: Graubünden, Switzerland
- Coordinates: 46°38′6″N 10°11′55″E

Operation
- Opened: 1965 (for private use); 1968 (for public use)
- Character: road, one-way

Technical
- Length: 3,394 metres (11,135 ft)
- No. of lanes: 1

The Munt la Schera Tunnel is a single lane road tunnel located in the Swiss canton of Graubünden. It connects the Engadin valley with Lago di Livigno, through Munt la Schera. Completed in 1965, the tunnel is 3,394 metres (11,135 ft) in length.

The tunnel was built to transport building materials for the construction of the Punt dal Gall dam. It was opened for public use in 1968, but is still owned and operated by the hydroelectric power company Engadiner Kraftwerke AG. The tunnel is only wide enough for a single vehicle so traffic moves in alternate directions, controlled by traffic lights which change every 15 minutes. (A different pattern of alternating traffic applies on Saturdays in winter.) The tunnel is open 24 hours a day to motor vehicles no more than 3.6 metres (12 ft) in height and 2.5 metres (8 ft 2 in) in width but since 2008 it is closed to cyclists. From June to September, cyclists may take their cycles on a half-hourly shuttle bus, and at other times they may use a limited number of places on the public bus service.

As of May 2015, the standard daytime toll for a single car journey through the tunnel is CHF16/EUR15. Slightly higher tolls are charged at night.
