= Lago di Livigno =

Reservoir in Italy and Switzerland

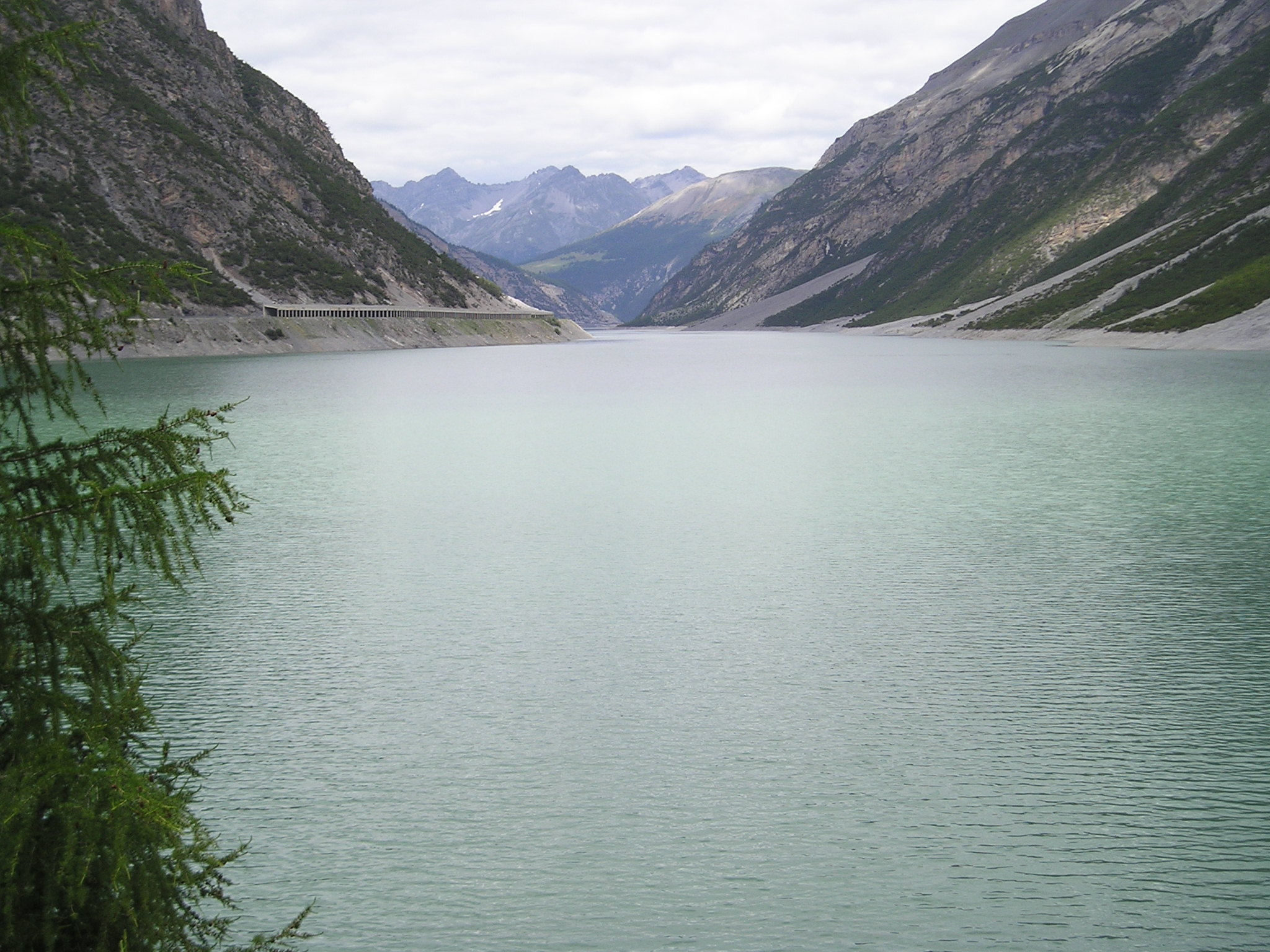

- Location within Canton of Graubünden Location within Switzerland Location within Lombardy Location within Italy Location within Alps
- Interactive map of Lago di Livigno
- Location: Grisons, Lombardy
- Coordinates: 46°37′20″N 10°11′36″E
- Primary inflows: Spöl, Acqua del Gallo, Canale Torto, Torrente Federia
- Primary outflows: Spöl
- Catchment area: 295 km^{2} (114 sq mi)
- Basin countries: Italy, Switzerland
- Surface area: 4.71 km^{2} (1.82 sq mi)
- Max. depth: 119 m (390 ft)
- Water volume: 164.6×10^{6} m^{3} (5.81×10^{9} cu ft)
- Surface elevation: 1,805 m (5,922 ft)
- Settlements: Livigno

Lago di Livigno or Lago del Gallo is a reservoir in the Livigno valley. The reservoir is mostly in Italy whereas the Punt dal Gall arch dam is crossed by the border with Switzerland (Zernez, Grisons).

The reservoir's surface area is 4.71 km². It has a capacity of 164 million m³. Its minimum and maximum water levels above sea level are at 1,700 metres and 1,805 metres respectively.

The first filling began on 16 October 1968 with 50 million m³ of water.

Since its construction, this reservoir had been off-limits for any activity, such as wind-surfing or rowing, until the summer of 2005, when Italy's National Rowing team was authorized to train on the lake.

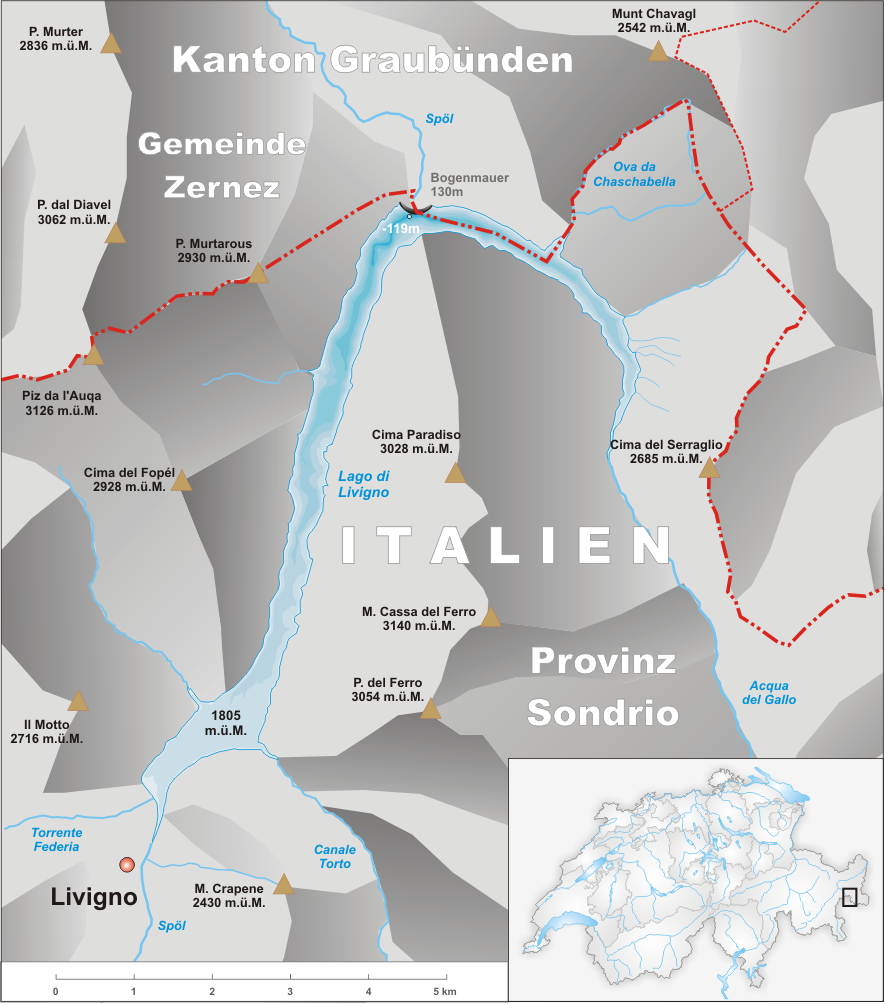
Map of the lake.

== See also ==
- List of lakes of Switzerland
- List of mountain lakes of Switzerland
