= Susch =

- Former municipality
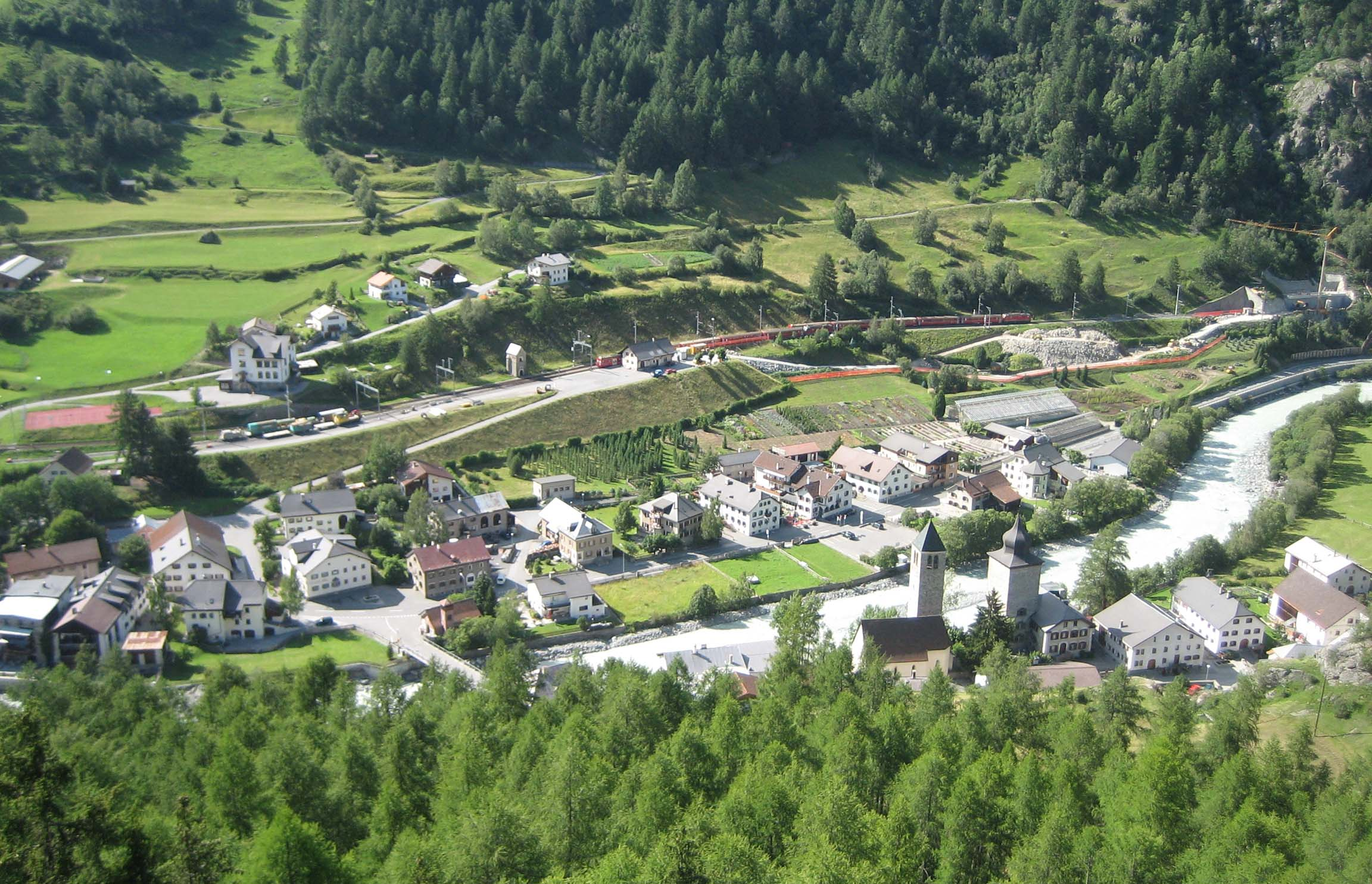

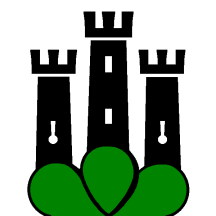
- Flag Coat of arms
- Location of Susch
- Location within Switzerland Location within Canton of Graubünden
- Coordinates: 46°45′N 10°4′E
- Country: Switzerland
- Canton: Graubünden
- District: Inn

Area
  - Total: 93.95 km^{2} (36.27 sq mi)
- Elevation: 1,438 m (4,718 ft)

Population (Dec 2014)
  - Total: 206
  - Density: 2.19/km^{2} (5.68/sq mi)
- Time zone: UTC+01:00 (CET)
  - Summer (DST): UTC+02:00 (CEST)
- Postal code: 7542
- SFOS number: 3744
- ISO 3166 code: CH-GR
- Surrounded by: Davos, Klosters-Serneus, Lavin, S-chanf, Zernez
- Website: www.susch.ch

Susch (Swiss Standard German: [suːʃ]; formally Süs) is a village and former municipality in the district of Inn in the Swiss canton of Graubünden. On 1 January 2015 the former municipalities of Lavin and Susch merged into the municipality of Zernez.

The Flüela Pass connects Susch with Davos.

Aerial view (1947)

== Demographics ==
Susch had a population of 206 (as of 2014).

== See also ==
- Muzeum Susch
- Susch railway station
