= Livigno =

- Comune
- Comune di Livigno
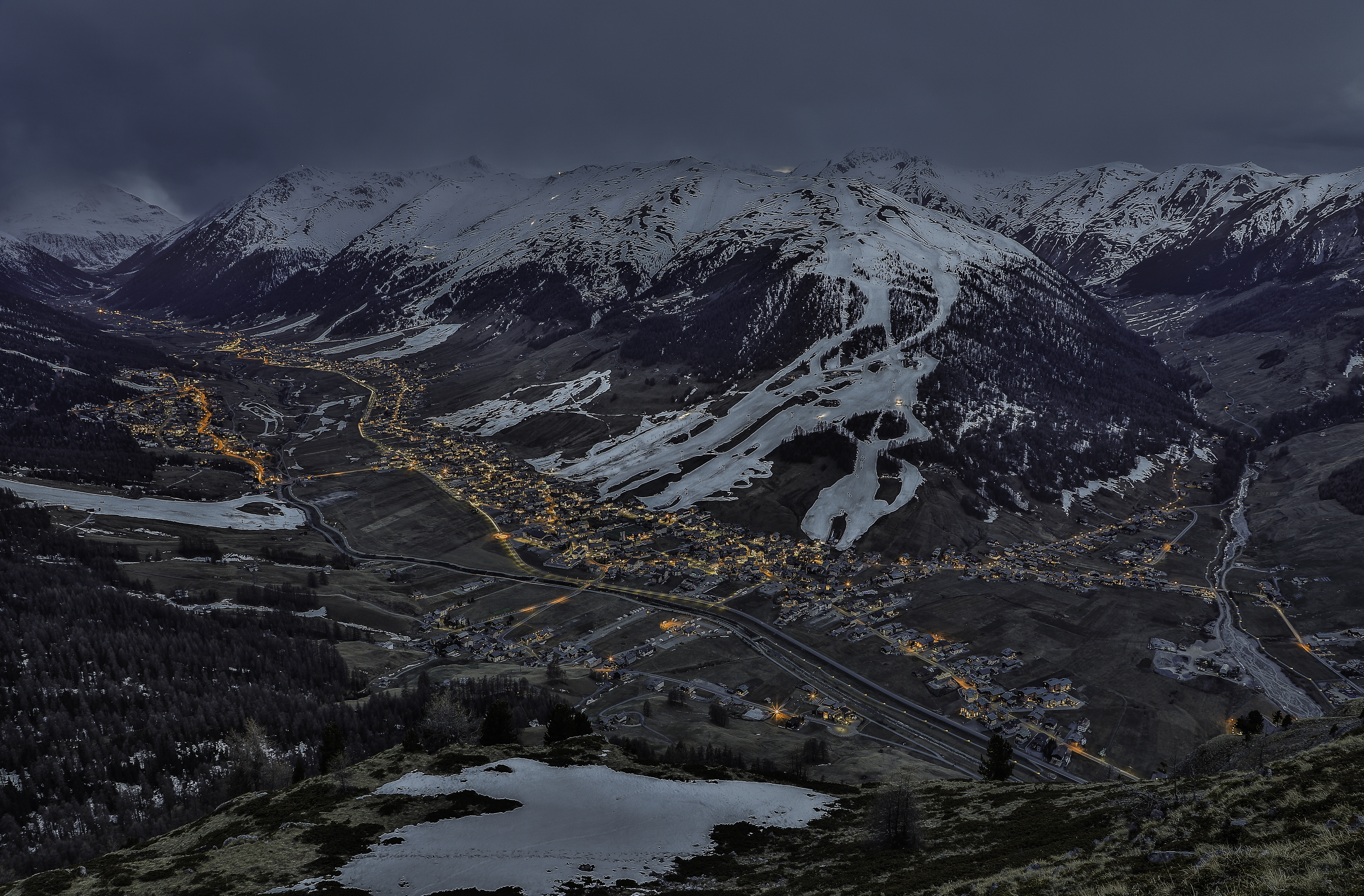

- Flag Coat of arms

- Location within Italy Location within Lombardy
- Coordinates: 46°32′N 10°08′E
- Country: Italy
- Region: Lombardy
- Province: Sondrio (SO)
- Frazioni: Trepalle

Government
  - Mayor: Damiano Bormolini

Area
  - Total: 227.3 km^{2} (87.8 sq mi)
- Elevation: 1,816 m (5,958 ft)

Population (30 September 2025)
  - Total: 6,669
  - Density: 29.34/km^{2} (75.99/sq mi)
- Demonym: Livignaschi
- Time zone: UTC+1 (CET)
  - Summer (DST): UTC+2 (CEST)
- Postal code: 23041
- Dialing code: 0342
- Patron saint: Holy Mary / Saint Anna (for Trepalle)
- Saint day: 8 September / 21 July (for Trepalle)
- Website: Official website

Livigno (Italian: [liˈviɲɲo]; local Lombard: Livígn [liˈʋiɲ]; German: Luwin) is a town, comune and a special-administered territory in the province of Sondrio, in the region of Lombardy, Italy, located in the Italian Alps, near the Swiss border.

== History ==
Livigno's first settlers were probably shepherds during the Middle Ages. The first documents called this area Vinea et Vineola. The name possibly comes from an old German word for "avalanche" which have always been frequent in the valley – the last avalanche to hit the village was in 1951, causing seven deaths and damage to a dozen houses.

Politically, Livigno has always followed Bormio's history, although the relationships between the two communes have always been tense, Bormio being dominant and more populous than Livigno. Until the 1970s Livigno was a farming village. In recent decades, however, things have changed, and nowadays Livigno enjoys a better economic situation and a higher number of inhabitants. Livigno has recently enjoyed one of Italy's highest birth rates (19.4 births per 1000 inhabitants). Livigno's economy is based on tourism, both in winter and in summer, and on its duty-free status, with goods sold at bargain prices.

== Geography ==
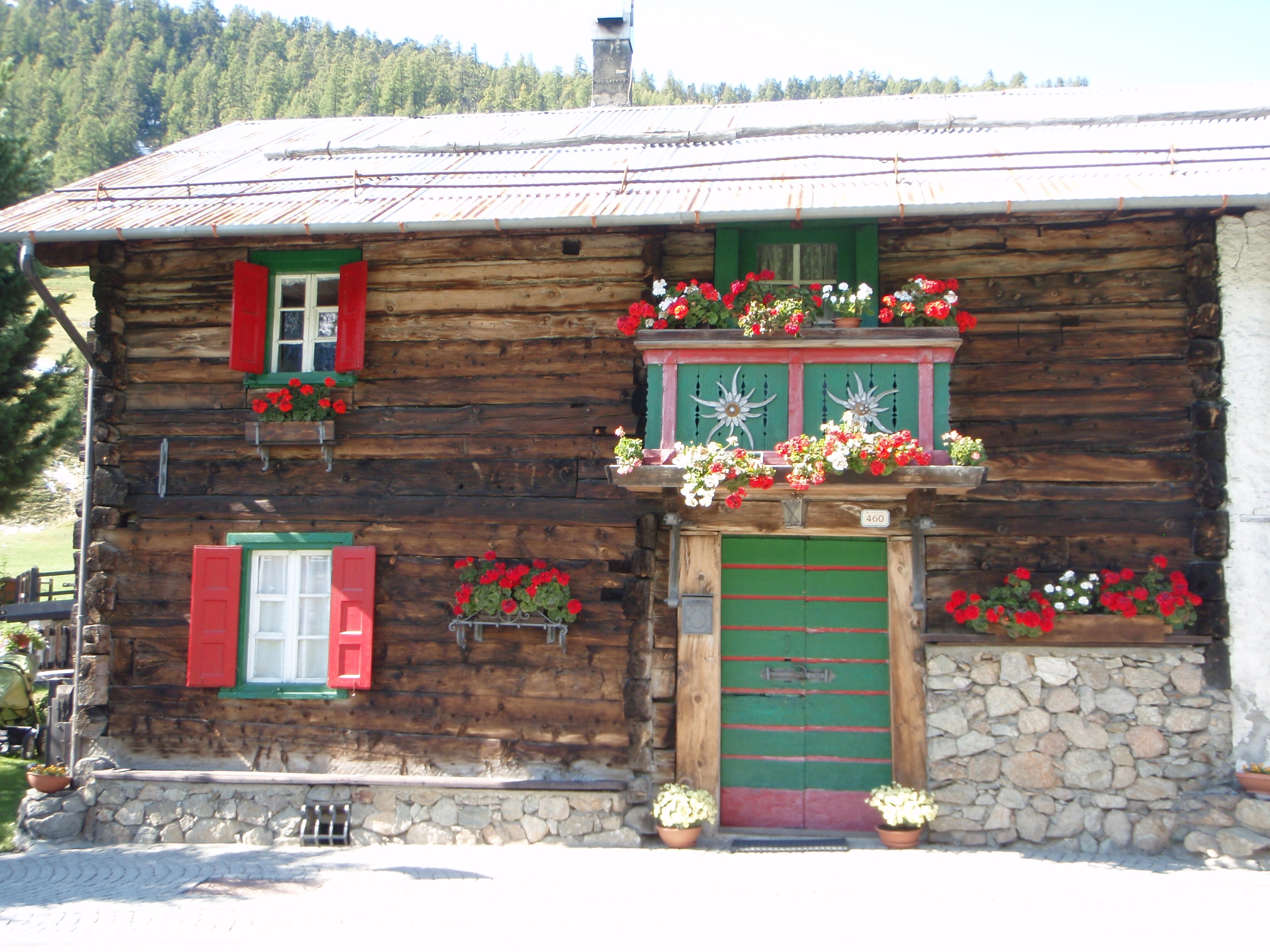
Typical baita in Livigno

Livigno is 1,816 m (5,958 ft) above sea level. Livigno's main river is called Aqua Granda or Spöl. Trepalle, a frazione in the municipality of Livigno, is considered Europe's highest inhabited parish. Livigno was once a traditional and cultural village. Livigno is one of the few Italian villages which do not belong to the drainage basin of the Mediterranean Sea but to the Black Sea basin. Between 1965 and 1968, Swiss electric company Engadiner Kraftwerke AG, following an agreement with the Italian government, purchased land in Livigno in order to build a reservoir, the Lago di Livigno, for electricity production. Some houses and a church, "Chiesetta di Viera" lying in the valley where the reservoir would be built, had to be demolished.

=== Climate ===
Livigno has a very cold, wet subalpine climate (Köppen: Dfc). Most of winter is spent below freezing and snow is abundant. Summer is the only part of the year in which temperatures above 10 °C (50 °F) are common, and frosts are less common (but still occur every year). Temperatures over 20 °C (68 °F) are rare.

Climate data for Livigno (2009–2025)
Month	Jan	Feb	Mar	Apr	May	Jun	Jul	Aug	Sep	Oct	Nov	Dec	Year
Record high °C (°F)	2 (36)	1 (34)	5 (41)	12 (54)	18 (64)	23 (73)	23 (73)	23 (73)	20 (68)	17 (63)	9 (48)	2 (36)	23 (73)
Mean daily maximum °C (°F)	−5.9 (21.4)	−5.0 (23.0)	−1.8 (28.8)	1.6 (34.9)	6.6 (43.9)	12.0 (53.6)	14.8 (58.6)	14.8 (58.6)	9.8 (49.6)	4.4 (39.9)	−1.0 (30.2)	−4.9 (23.2)	3.8 (38.8)
Daily mean °C (°F)	−10.0 (14.0)	−9.6 (14.7)	−5.7 (21.7)	−1.3 (29.7)	3.7 (38.7)	8.9 (48.0)	11.3 (52.3)	11.1 (52.0)	6.2 (43.2)	0.8 (33.4)	−4.3 (24.3)	−8.5 (16.7)	0.2 (32.4)
Mean daily minimum °C (°F)	−14.1 (6.6)	−14.1 (6.6)	−9.6 (14.7)	−4.1 (24.6)	0.9 (33.6)	5.9 (42.6)	7.8 (46.0)	7.3 (45.1)	2.6 (36.7)	−2.8 (27.0)	−7.6 (18.3)	−12.2 (10.0)	−3.3 (26.1)
Record low °C (°F)	−35 (−31)	−33 (−27)	−29 (−20)	−23 (−9)	−12 (10)	−6 (21)	−5 (23)	−4 (25)	−11 (12)	−24 (−11)	−37 (−35)	−37 (−35)	−37 (−35)
Average rainfall mm (inches)	106.7 (4.20)	122.7 (4.83)	133.9 (5.27)	205.1 (8.07)	247.8 (9.76)	270.6 (10.65)	274.5 (10.81)	128.9 (5.07)	178.4 (7.02)	125.0 (4.92)	171.1 (6.74)	121.0 (4.76)	2,085.7 (82.11)
Average snowfall cm (inches)	85.8 (33.8)	99.6 (39.2)	106.7 (42.0)	140.6 (55.4)	102.0 (40.2)	47.6 (18.7)	9.3 (3.7)	10.7 (4.2)	49.2 (19.4)	68.4 (26.9)	128.0 (50.4)	95.5 (37.6)	943.6 (371.5)
Average rainy days	4.1	4.1	6.0	10.2	19.0	24.9	26.8	25.7	17.0	10.7	4.6	3.8	156.8
Average snowy days	18.4	20.3	22.0	22.4	17.4	8.1	2.3	2.7	8.0	12.8	16.2	17.1	167.9
Average relative humidity (%)	94.8	94.6	97.0	96.0	90.0	83.8	82.0	82.6	85.1	87.2	91.1	90.7	89.6
Source: World Weather Online

Below freezing days, 2009–2025
	Jan	Feb	Mar	Apr	May	Jun	Jul	Aug	Sep	Oct	Nov	Dec	Year
Average high temperature below freezing days	29.8	26.9	20.6	8.6	1.7	0.0	0.0	0.0	0.1	5.6	17.1	28.1	138.3
Average low temperature below freezing days	31.0	28.0	30.9	29.0	22.0	7.7	3.6	4.4	14.2	22.8	30.0	31.0	254.6

== Main sights ==
Saint Mary's parish church was erected at the end of the 19th century, on a previous church. The current building incorporated the previous one, which was left standing until the end of works, allowing church services to be carried out as usual.

Other buildings of note are the Caravaggio church, with some ex voto paintings, and Saint Rocco church, built at the beginning of the 16th century as an offering for protecting the village against plague. Local scenery encompasses high peaked mountains and deep valleys.

== Duty-free status ==
Livigno enjoys a special tax status as a duty-free area. Italian VAT (value added tax) is not paid. Although tax advantages for Livigno were recorded as far back as the sixteenth century, the current tax exemption was first introduced by the Austrian Empire around 1840. It was then confirmed by the Kingdom of Italy around 1910, then by the Italian Republic and the European Economic Community in 1960. Although there is zero value added tax on many consumer goods, income tax is paid, as in neighboring Switzerland, therefore Livigno cannot be considered a tax haven.

The justification for such a status is the difficulty in reaching Livigno during winter, and the centuries-long history of poverty in the region. The various states wanted to ensure people would have an incentive to live in the area (so that they could claim it territorially). At the same time, the tax revenue from Livigno would have been negligible.

Only three roads lead to the town. Two link to Switzerland, one through the Forcola di Livigno, elevation 2,315 m (7,595 ft) and open in summer only, and the second through the Munt la Schera Tunnel. The third road connects to other parts of Italy through the Foscagno Pass, elevation 2,291 m (7,516 ft).

Leaving Livigno for the rest of Italy, there is a customs checkpoint on the road staffed by officers of the Italian militarized Guardia di Finanza. Entering or leaving from or to Switzerland there are both Guardia di Finanza officers and Swiss Border Guards.

== Economy ==
Livigno once made a living from agriculture and a little commerce. Smuggling was both widespread and not socially deprecated, being often the only way to survive in such a harsh environment. This generated some prejudice in the remaining population of Valtellina, where smuggling was also widespread, with the local proverb gent de cunfin, tücc' lader o asesin, or "border people, all thieves or murderers".

Nowadays Livigno is a rich area, and the main activities are linked to tourism, especially as a ski resort. Many inhabitants of Valtellina visit once in a while to buy goods at substantially lower prices, especially tax-free gasoline, sometimes from as far as Sondrio. The tax free allowance for tourists applied here is the same as the one applied to travellers coming from any non EU country.

The 2005 Union Cycliste Internationale mountain biking world championships were held here, from 28 August to 4 September.

== Culture and sport ==
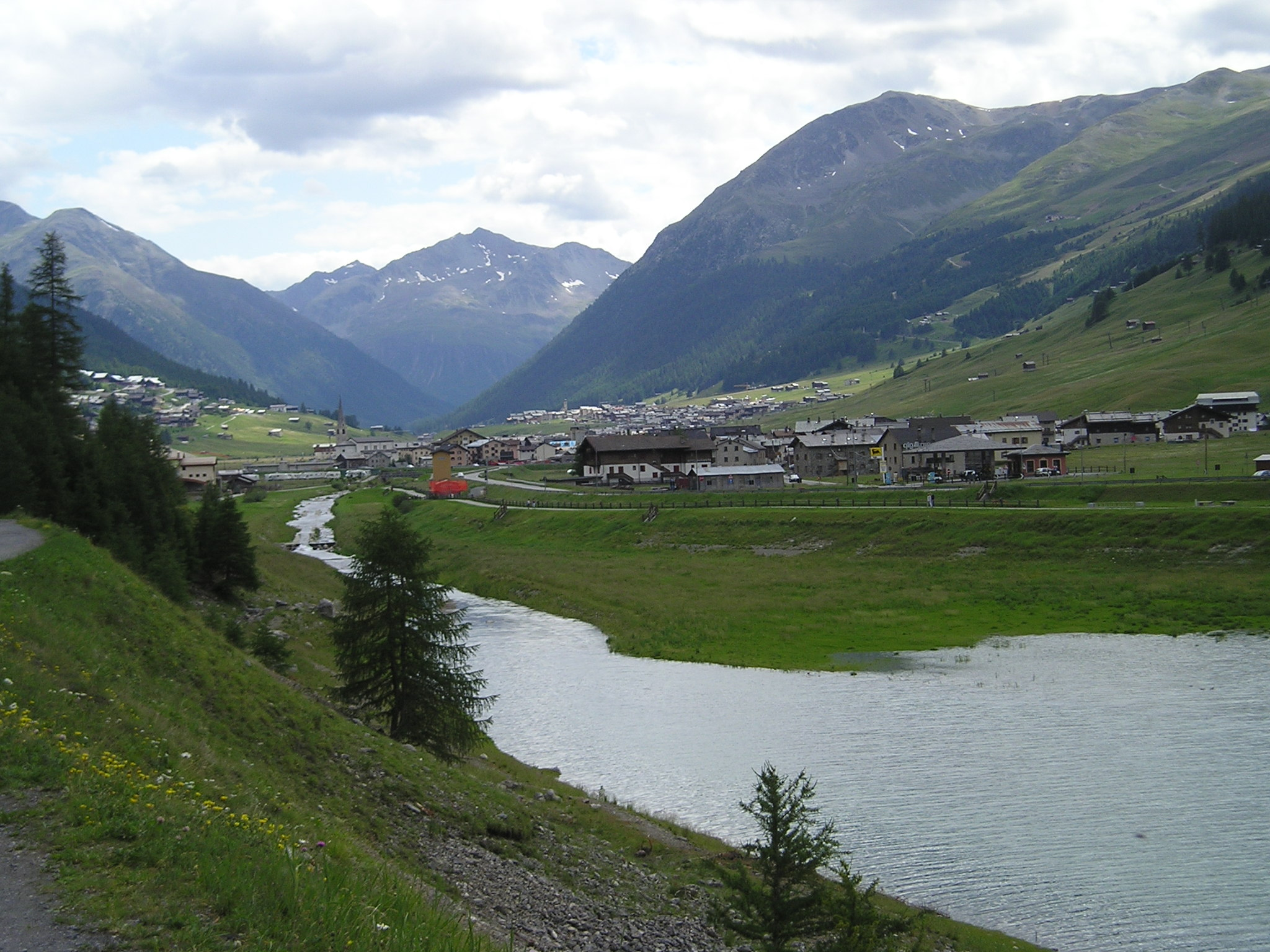
Livigno from the confluence of the Aqua Granda with the Gallo Lake

Despite its small size, there are many cultural organizations in Livigno. Some of these are:

- Corpo Musicale, a local street band
- Gruppo folkloristico, a folk group
- Monteneve Chorus
- Carcent theatre group
- A few rock/pop bands, the most well-known being MetalDreit

The mass-media sector is quite developed as well. In the 1980s a local radio, Radio Alteuropa, used to broadcast from Livigno, covering up to a wide part of the neighbouring Valtellina valley. The local monthly newspaper, Al Restel, was founded in the same period and it is still published today.

Nowadays, most information is given by a TV channel, TeleMonteNeve, which broadcasts the city council's meetings, a news report three times a week and other information both for residents and for tourists. On-line new media is also growing. An example is Senzaiva, an on-line cultural magazine. Its name means "without VAT", referring to the special duty-free status of Livigno and of all cultural products.

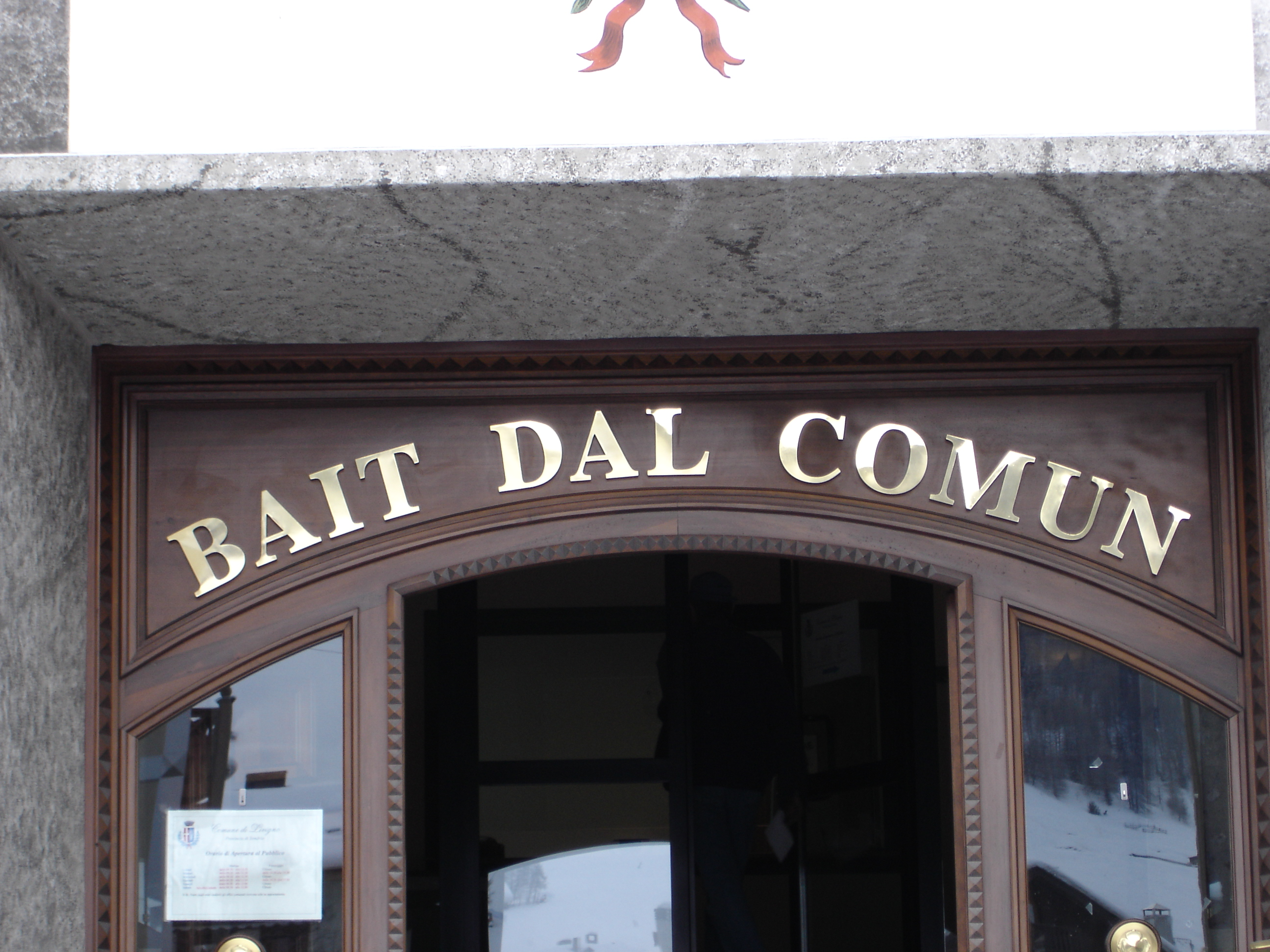
The Town Hall sign in the local dialect

The local dialect has been categorized in a dictionary, funded by the local administration. This language variety is used locally in street names and in some other signs, as well as on the official maps.

Sport also plays an important role. In Livigno there are nearly 20 sport associations, most of them are supported by an association called Sporting Club. Many young athletes often end up with good results in their discipline (see Notable people below).

Sport is relevant also in terms of tourism. In Livigno people not only go and see sports competitions, which is a key component of so-called sport tourism, but also play outdoor or indoor sports. The local tourist offer covers the four seasons, so there's the possibility not only of practising winter sports but also trekking, mountain biking, and since the lake was made navigable, water sports became another option. Furthermore, due to its 1,816 m (5,958 ft) above sea level, Livigno often hosts the training sessions of professional athletes of different disciplines, who come to the alpine resort to benefit from the high altitude.

== Skiing and snowboarding ==
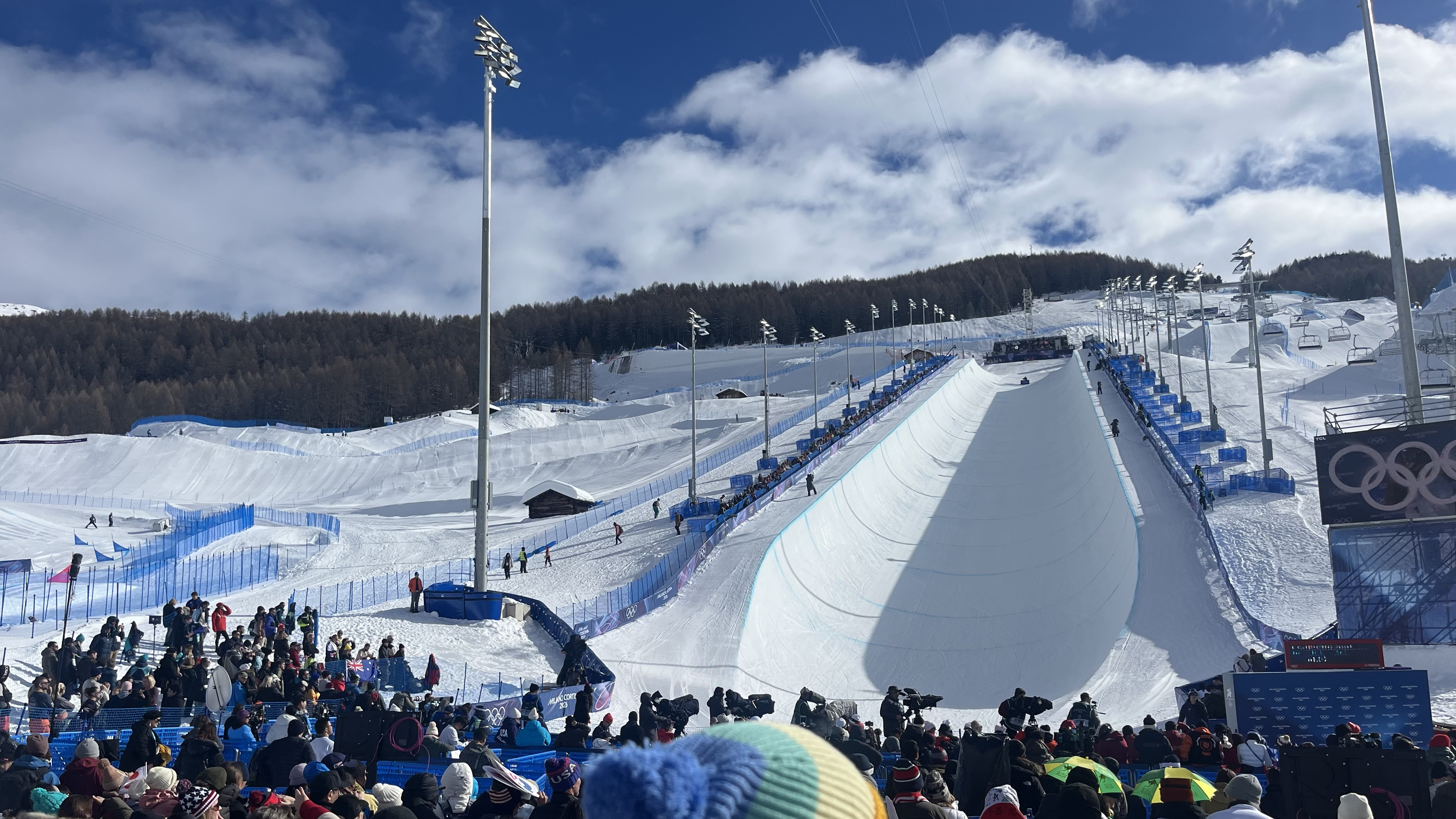
Qualification for the women's Snowboard Halfpipe at the 2026 Winter Olympics, Livigno

There are two separate ski areas at Livigno, one on either side of the valley: Carosello 3000 (Vetta Blesaccia & Costaccia mountains), the other is the Mottolino area (Monte della Neve & Monte Sponda mountains) to the east. Livigno ski area: 115 km of piste (12 black runs, 37 red and 29 blue slopes). 31 lifts: (6-cableways 13-chairlifts, 11-ski lifts). Skiing season from late November until early May.

At the 2006 Turin Winter Olympics, no less than eight Italian athletes came from Livigno. It was used for snowboarding and freestyle skiing in the 2026 Winter Olympics in Milan and Cortina d'Ampezzo.

In 2015, Livigno was home to the European Freeride Festival which ran between 31 January and 4 February.

== Chess ==
Since 2010 the International Livigno Chess Open has taken place, organized by the local chess club. It has attracted people from all over the world. Winner for 2010 was GM Igor Naumkin, in 2011 GM Sergey Volkov (both from Russia) and in 2012 the Italian GM Alberto David. These tournaments also proved successful, so that even the FIDE (World Chess Federation) has mentioned them.

== People ==
- Daniela Zini (born 1959), team skier (9th place in 1980 Alpine Skiing World Cup), born locally
- Ivan Bormolini (born 1972), Alpine Skiing World Cup ski-racer
- Gianluigi Galli (born 1973), rally car driver in World Rally Championship, born in and lives in the town
- Giorgio Rocca (born 1975), skier (winner of slalom specialty cup in 2006 Alpine Skiing World Cup), lives locally
- Marianna Longa (born 1979), cross-country skier in Italy's National Team.
- Cousins Katia Zini (born 1981) and Mara Zini (born 1979) bronze medallists in short track speed skating in 2006 Winter Olympics

== See also ==
- Venues of the 2026 Winter Olympics and Paralympics
