= Lavin =

- Former municipality
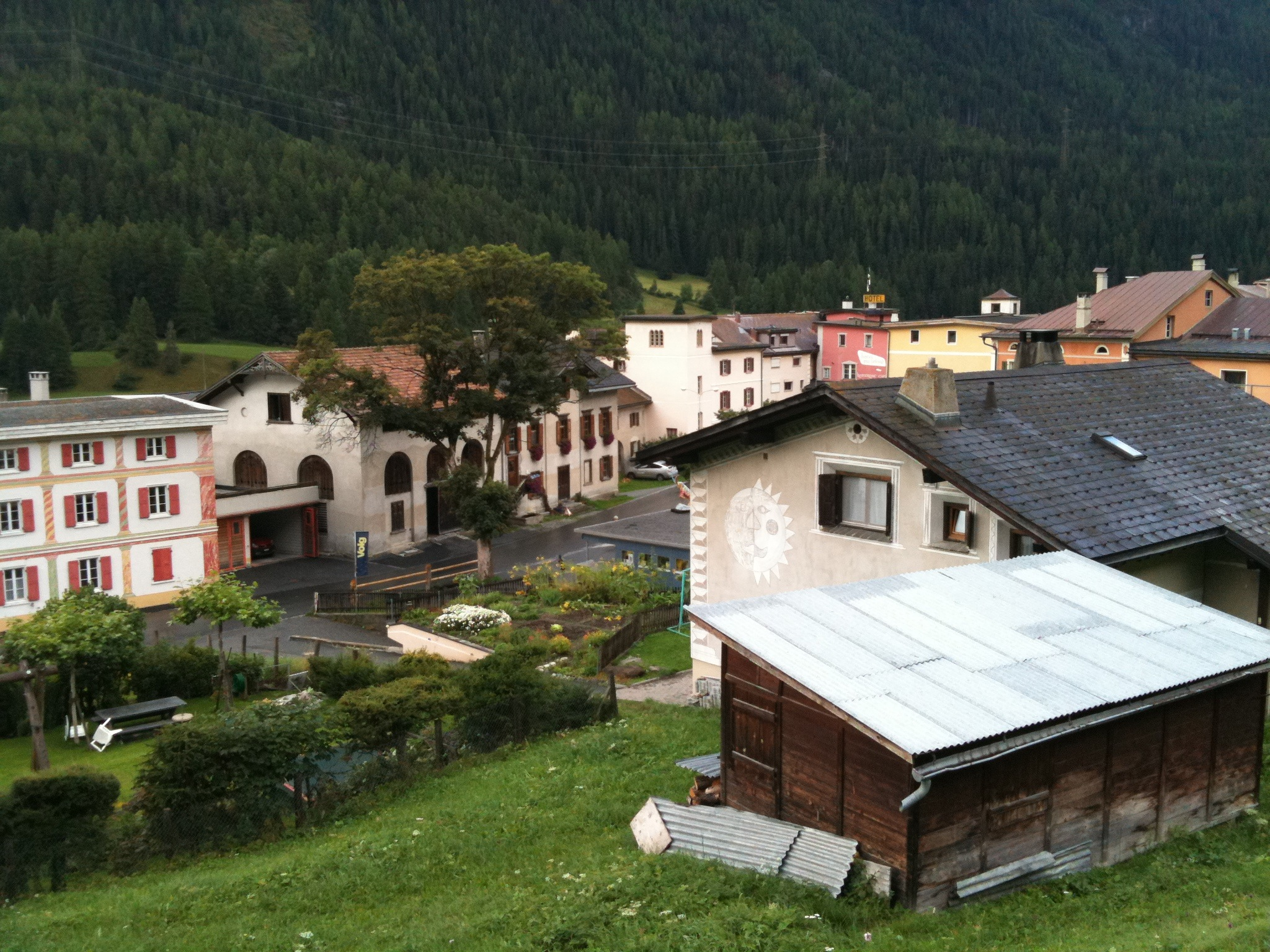

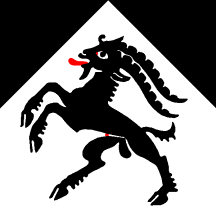
- Flag Coat of arms
- Location of Lavin
- Location within Switzerland Location within Canton of Graubünden
- Coordinates: 46°46′N 10°06′E
- Country: Switzerland
- Canton: Graubünden
- District: Inn

Area
  - Total: 46.18 km^{2} (17.83 sq mi)
- Elevation: 1,412 m (4,633 ft)

Population (Dec 2014)
  - Total: 221
  - Density: 4.79/km^{2} (12.4/sq mi)
- Time zone: UTC+01:00 (CET)
  - Summer (DST): UTC+02:00 (CEST)
- Postal code: 7543
- SFOS number: 3743
- ISO 3166 code: CH-GR
- Surrounded by: Ardez, Gaschurn (AT-8), Guarda, Klosters-Serneus, Susch, Zernez
- Website: www.lavin.ch

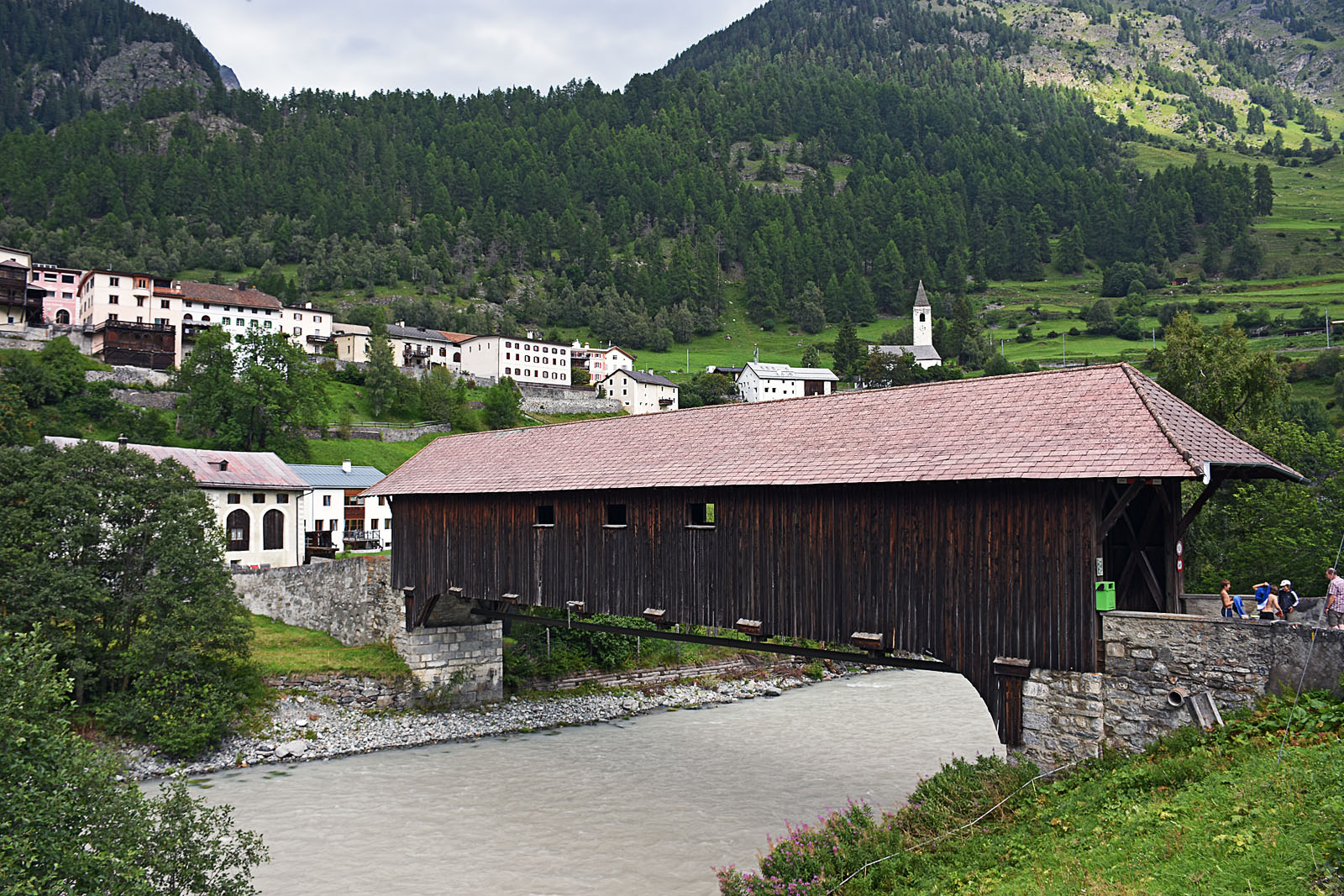
Lavin old wooden bridge

Lavin is a former municipality in the district of Inn in the Swiss canton of Graubünden. On 1 January 2015 the former municipalities of Lavin and Susch merged into the municipality of Zernez.

== History ==
Lavin is first mentioned in the 12th century as Lawinis.

== Geography ==
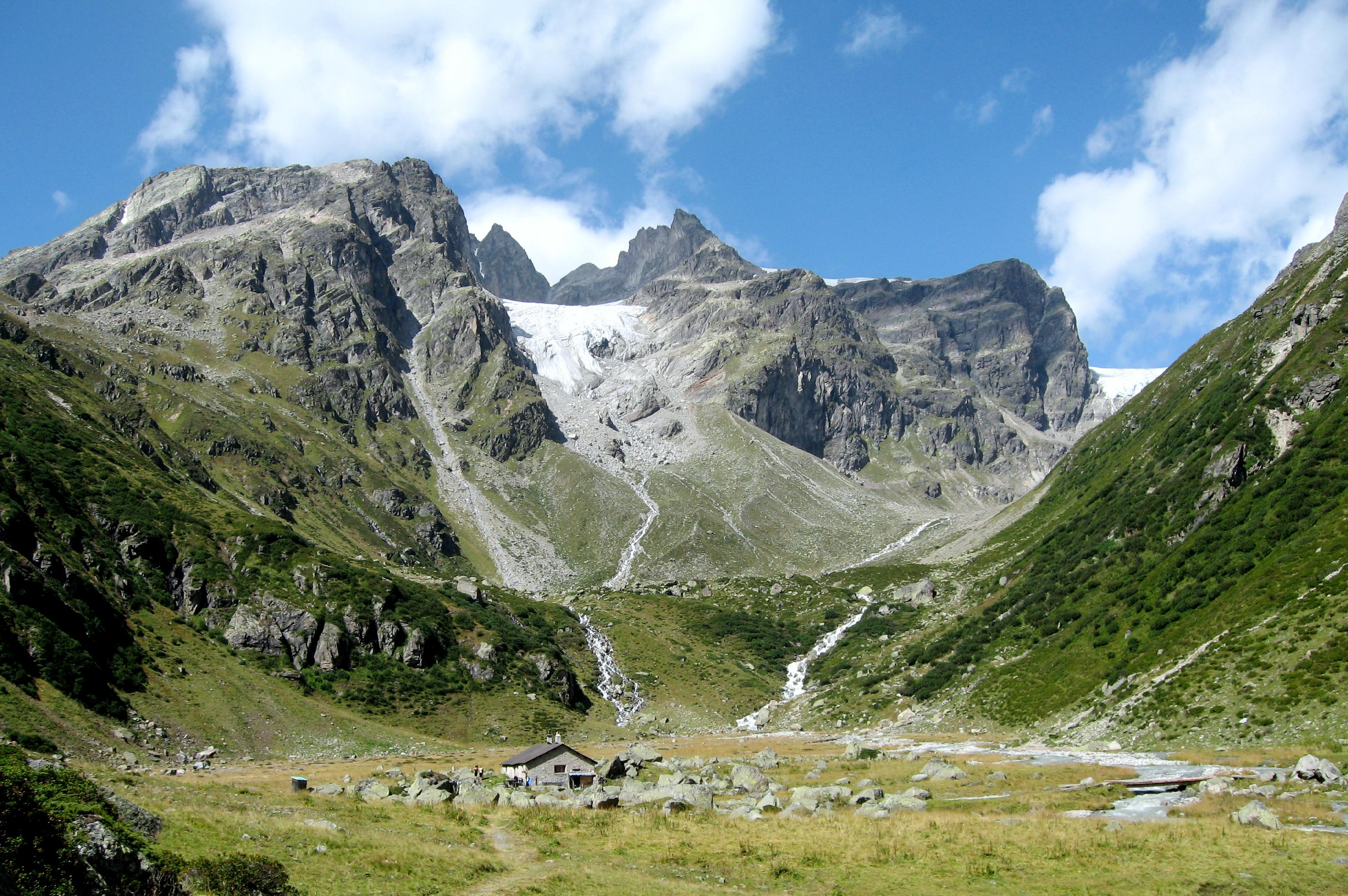
Verstanclahorn mountain near Lavin

Aerial view (1947)

Lavin had an area, as of 2006, of 46.2 km^{2} (17.8 sq mi). Of this area, 19.9% is used for agricultural purposes, while 18.3% is forested. Of the rest of the land, 0.6% is settled (buildings or roads) and the remainder (61.2%) is non-productive (rivers, glaciers or mountains).

The former municipality is located in the Sur Tasna sub-district of the Inn district on the left bank of the Inn river. It is the capital of the sub-district. It consists of the linear village of Lavin.

== Demographics ==
Lavin had a population (as of 2014) of 221. As of 2008, 8.5% of the population was made up of foreign nationals. Over the last 10 years the population has grown at a rate of 7.2%.

As of 2000, the gender distribution of the population was 46.9% male and 53.1% female. The age distribution, as of 2000, in Lavin is; 18 children or 10.3% of the population are between 0 and 9 years old. 14 teenagers or 8.0% are 10 to 14, and 12 teenagers or 6.9% are 15 to 19. Of the adult population, 15 people or 8.6% of the population are between 20 and 29 years old. 20 people or 11.5% are 30 to 39, 25 people or 14.4% are 40 to 49, and 22 people or 12.6% are 50 to 59. The senior population distribution is 14 people or 8.0% of the population are between 60 and 69 years old, 25 people or 14.4% are 70 to 79, there are 7 people or 4.0% who are 80 to 89, and there are 2 people or 1.1% who are 90 to 99.

In the 2007 federal election the most popular party was the SPS which received 46.8% of the vote. The next three most popular parties were the SVP (26.1%), the FDP (15.5%) and the CVP (6.1%).

The entire Swiss population is generally well educated. In Lavin about 87.7% of the population (between age 25–64) have completed either non-mandatory upper secondary education or additional higher education (either university or a Fachhochschule).

Lavin has an unemployment rate of 0.71%. As of 2005, there were 20 people employed in the primary economic sector and about 8 businesses involved in this sector. 2 people are employed in the secondary sector and there is 1 business in this sector. 50 people are employed in the tertiary sector, with 9 businesses in this sector.

The historical population is given in the following table:

year	population
1835	359
1850	367
1900	249
1950	242
1970	155
1990	184
2000	174

== Languages ==
Most of the population (as of 2000) speaks Rhaeto-Romance (75.9%), with German being second most common (23.0%) and Portuguese being third ( 0.6%). By the 19th Century there was a German-speaking minority in Lavin. However the majority speak the Vallader Romansh dialect. Between 1880 and 1941 the Romansh speaking percentage remained the same (83%). In the last decades the Romansh speaking percentage has decreased. In 1990 91% of the population understood Romansh, though some spoke it as a second language, and in 2000 it was 86%.

Languages in Lavin
Languages	Census 1980		Census 1990		Census 2000	
Languages	Number	Percent	Number	Percent	Number	Percent
German	33	18.13%	38	20.65%	40	22.99%
Romanish	147	80.77%	145	78.80%	132	75.86%
Population	182	100%	184	100%	174	100%

== Heritage sites of national significance ==
The abandoned village of Gonda is listed as a Swiss heritage site of national significance. Gonda was first mentioned about 1160 and by the 17th Century was abandoned. In 1983 it was restored.
