= Foscagno Pass =

Mountain pass in Sondrio, Italy

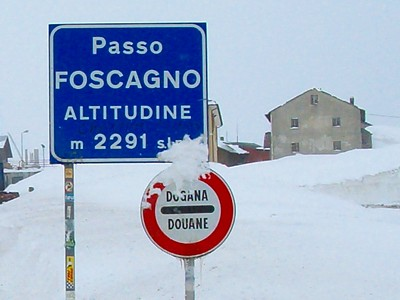

- Location within Alps
- Elevation: 2,291 metres (7,516 ft)
- Traversed by: SS 301

Third Approach
- Location: Lombardy, Italy
- Range: Alps
- Coordinates: 46.495°N 10.209°E

Foscagno Pass (Italian: Passo di Foscagno, Romansh: Pass da Fus-chagn) (el. 2291 m.) is a high mountain pass in the Alps in the province of Sondrio, northern Italy.

The road (SS 301) connects Bormio in the east and Livigno in the west. It is the only link between Livigno and the rest of Italy, and is usually open all year round.

This route also includes the subsidiary Eira Pass (Italian: Passo d'Eira) (2209 m) which lies between the Foscagno Pass and Livigno itself. Here lies the village of Trepalle, part of Livigno municipality, and one of Europe's highest inhabited parishes.

Although both sides of the pass are in the same country, Italy, you are required to pass through customs at the top. This is due to the duty-free status of Livigno.

The pass is located on the main alpine watershed. Water on the north side of the pass flows down into the Inn and Danube, whereas water on the south side flows down into the Adda and Po.

== See also ==
- List of highest paved roads in Europe
- List of mountain passes
