= Trepalle =

Village of Italy in the Italian Alps

Coordinates: 46°32′N 10°11′E

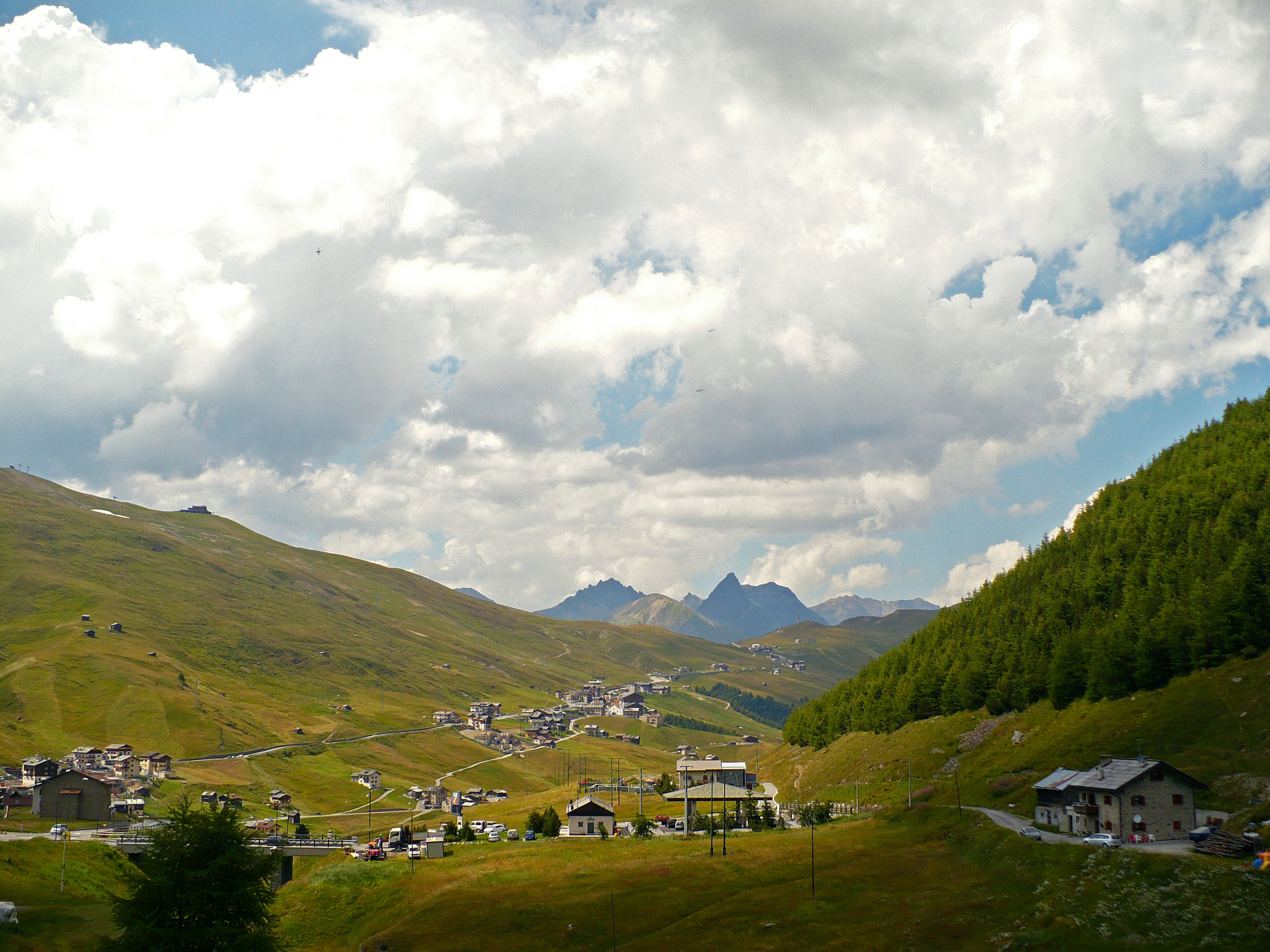
Trepalle

Trepalle is a village (the highest in Italy) in the Italian Alps, a frazione of Livigno, Lombardy. It is sometimes considered to be the village located at the highest altitude in Europe and is the highest in the European Union with its church located at the Passo d'Eira at 2,209 m (7,247 ft). However, Kurush in southern Dagestan in Russia is situated much higher at 2,480–2,560 m (8,140–8,400 ft) in the northern Caucasus Mountains.

Trepalle is located above Livigno between the Foscagno Pass and the Eira Pass. The northern part of the village, by the Eira Pass, is one of the main skiing areas of Livigno. As part of the comune of Livigno, it is also a duty-free area.

The name of this village means "three balls" in Italian, possibly mistranslated from Trevalle, which means "three valleys". In fact, Trepalle is reachable from three different valleys: Val Trela, Val di Foscagno and Vallaccia.

The village's former priest Don Alessandro Parenti inspired Italian writer Giovannino Guareschi for the character of Don Camillo.

== Climate ==
The ET Alpine tundra climate is one of the coldest in Europe, with an average temperature below freezing:

Climate data for Trepalle
Month	Jan	Feb	Mar	Apr	May	Jun	Jul	Aug	Sep	Oct	Nov	Dec	Year
Mean daily maximum °C (°F)	−8.4 (16.9)	−6.6 (20.1)	−2.5 (27.5)	1.3 (34.3)	5.5 (41.9)	11.1 (52.0)	13.5 (56.3)	13.4 (56.1)	9.4 (48.9)	5.0 (41.0)	−2.1 (28.2)	−7.2 (19.0)	2.7 (36.9)
Daily mean °C (°F)	−12.2 (10.0)	−10.9 (12.4)	−6.7 (19.9)	−2.4 (27.7)	1.9 (35.4)	6.9 (44.4)	9.1 (48.4)	8.9 (48.0)	5.0 (41.0)	0.8 (33.4)	−5.7 (21.7)	−10.8 (12.6)	−1.3 (29.6)
Mean daily minimum °C (°F)	−16.4 (2.5)	−15.4 (4.3)	−11.2 (11.8)	−6.6 (20.1)	−2.3 (27.9)	2.0 (35.6)	4.0 (39.2)	4.1 (39.4)	0.4 (32.7)	−3.4 (25.9)	−9.6 (14.7)	−15 (5)	−5.8 (21.6)
Average precipitation mm (inches)	59 (2.3)	54 (2.1)	63 (2.5)	86 (3.4)	104 (4.1)	114 (4.5)	107 (4.2)	103 (4.1)	85 (3.3)	100 (3.9)	120 (4.7)	71 (2.8)	1,066 (41.9)
Average precipitation days	8	7	8	10	13	13	13	12	9	9	10	9	121
Average relative humidity (%)	70	71	71	74	79	73	71	73	75	78	78	71	74
Mean monthly sunshine hours	129	147	180	198	210	261	267	231	174	147	120	117	2,181
Source: climate-data.org

== See also ==
- Extreme points of Italy
