= Heidi Bucher =

Swiss artist

- Born: Adelheid Hildegard Müller; 23 February 1926; Winterthur, Switzerland
- Died: 11 December 1993 (aged 67); Brunnen, Switzerland
- Known for: Sculpture
- Spouse: Carl Bucher 1960 ending in divorce in the early 1970s
- Website: heidibucher.com

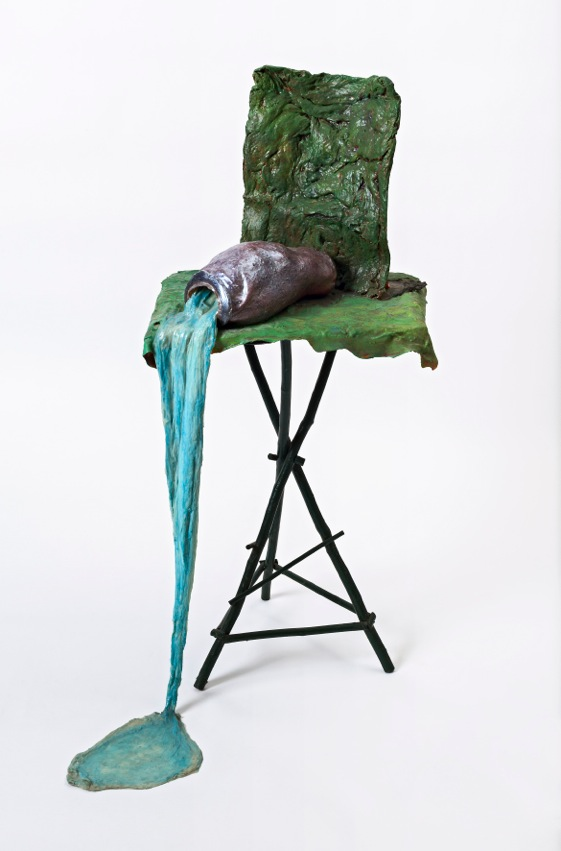
La chute de l'espoir, fiber, wood, glue, acrylic, 117 x 60 x 68 cm, 1986

Heidi Bucher (1926–1993) was a Swiss artist interested in exploring architectural space and the body through sculpture. She was born in Winterthur, Switzerland and attended the School for the Applied Arts in Zurich. Her work dealt primarily with private spaces, the body, domestication, and individual and collective experiences.

== Early work ==
Bucher's early work was mainly focused on the body. In the early 1970s, she moved to Los Angeles. While there, she collaborated with her then-husband Carl Bucher on Landings to Wear and Bodyshells. The large-scale, wearable works blurred the boundary between sculpture and apparel, and they were featured on the cover of Harper's Bazaar. An 8mm film shows the oversized foam "Bodyshells" in action on Venice Beach. They were showcased in an exhibition at the Museum of Contemporary Crafts (now the Museum of Art and Design) in New York City and exhibited at LACMA in April 1972.

== Later work ==
Bucher became more interested in the body's relationship to space in her later work. In the mid-1970s she began experimenting with a new technique, in which she soaked gauze sheets in latex rubber, and used them to cast the interior surfaces of the rooms of her grandparents' house in Winterthur, Switzerland. These were then pulled off in sheets to create thin, skin-like casts of the space; she referred to these casts as "Skinnings." In the 1981 film Räume sind Hüllen, sind Häute, showcased at the Swiss Institute, New York, Bucher captured the process of peeling off latex skins from architectural spaces, specifically her grandparents’ house, transforming everyday surfaces like walls and floors. Bucher's casting method, especially in works from the early 1980s, included slender bamboo poles to create relief in the latex skins, a technique not widely mentioned in official records. These were used to adapt to architectural details like inset paneling and door frames.

In 2017, she was selected to be part of the main exhibition at the 57th Venice Biennale, VIVA ARTE VIVA.

== Solo exhibitions ==
- 2018: Heidi Bucher, Parasol Unit, London, UK
- 2016: Hommage à Heidi Bucher und Carl Bucher, Kulturort Galerie Weiertal, Winterthur, CH
- 2014: Swiss Institute Contemporary Art, New York, USA
- 2014: Alexander Gray Associates, New York, USA
- 2013: Freymond-Guth Fine Arts, Zurich, CH
- 2013: Centre Culturel Suisse, Paris, France
- 2013: The Approach, London, UK
- 2004: Heidi Bucher – Mother of Pearl, Migros Museum für Gegenwartskunst, Zurich, CH
- 1995: Kunsthaus / Barlach Halle K, Hamburg, DE
- 1993: Villa Bleuler, Galerie im Weissen Haus, Winterthur, CH
- 1993: Und ziehen das Gestern ins Heute: Die Häute aus dem Bellevue Projekt, Kunstmuseum Thurgau, CH
- 1983: Hauträume, Kunstmuseum Winterthur, CH
- 1981: Räume sind Hüllen sind Häute, Galerie Maeght, Zurich, CH
- 1979: Parketthaut / Herrenzimmer / Mobili, Galerie Maeght, Zurich, CH
- 1979: L‘Objet préféré de l‘artiste, Galerie Numaga, Auvernier, CH
- 1977: Einbalsamierungen, Borg, Galerie Maeght, Zurich, CH
- 1973: Bodywrappings, Esther Bear Gallery, Santa Barbara, CA, USA
- 1972: Bodyshells, Los Angeles County Museum of Art, CA, USA
- 1971: Soft Sculptures to wear, Museum of Contemporary Crafts (Happenings in conjunction with solo shows by Carl Bucher), New York, NY, USA
- 1971: Musée d’Art Contemporain, Montréal (Happenings in conjunction with solo shows by Carl Bucher), CDN
- 1958: Silkcollage, World House Galleries, New York, NY, USA
- 1956: Collagen, Galerie Suzanne Feigel, Basel, CH
