= Zernez =

- Municipality
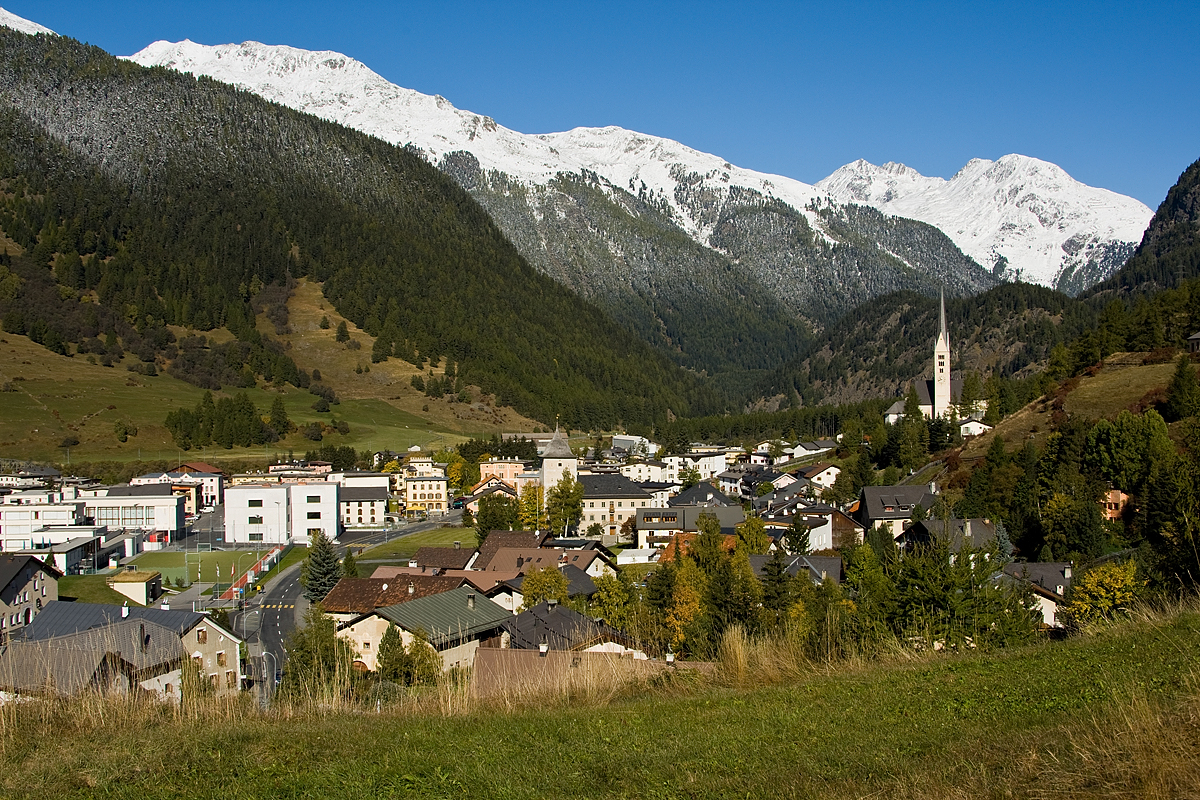
- Zernez village

- Flag Coat of arms
- Location of Zernez
- Location within Switzerland Location within Canton of Grisons
- Coordinates: 46°42′N 10°06′E
- Country: Switzerland
- Canton: Grisons
- District: Engiadina Bassa/Val Müstair

Area
  - Total: 203.85 km^{2} (78.71 sq mi)
- Elevation: 1,474 m (4,836 ft)

Population (December 2015)
  - Total: 1,570
  - Density: 7.70/km^{2} (19.9/sq mi)
- Time zone: UTC+01:00 (CET)
  - Summer (DST): UTC+02:00 (CEST)
- Postal code: 7530
- SFOS number: 3746
- ISO 3166 code: CH-GR
- Localities: Brail, Il Fuorn, Ova Spin, Runatsch
- Surrounded by: Ardez, Lavin, Livigno (IT-SO), S-chanf, Susch, Tarasp, Tschierv, Valdidentro (IT-SO)
- Website: www.zernez.ch

Zernez (Swiss Standard German: [tsɛrˈnɛts]) is a village and a municipality in the Engiadina Bassa/Val Müstair Region in the Swiss canton of the Grisons. On 1 January 2015 the former municipalities of Lavin and Susch merged into the municipality of Zernez.

Zernez is a major node in the regional road network, with roads leading into the Upper Engadine and towards Italy, the Lower Engadine and towards Austria, over the Fuorn Pass into the Val Mustair and over the Flüela Pass. Zernez is the center for visitors of the Swiss National Park (Romansh: Parc Naziunal).

== History ==
Zernez is first mentioned in 1131 as Gumpo de Ernece. In 1161-64 it was mentioned as Zarnetz though both references are found in a copy of the document from 1365.

== Geography and climate ==
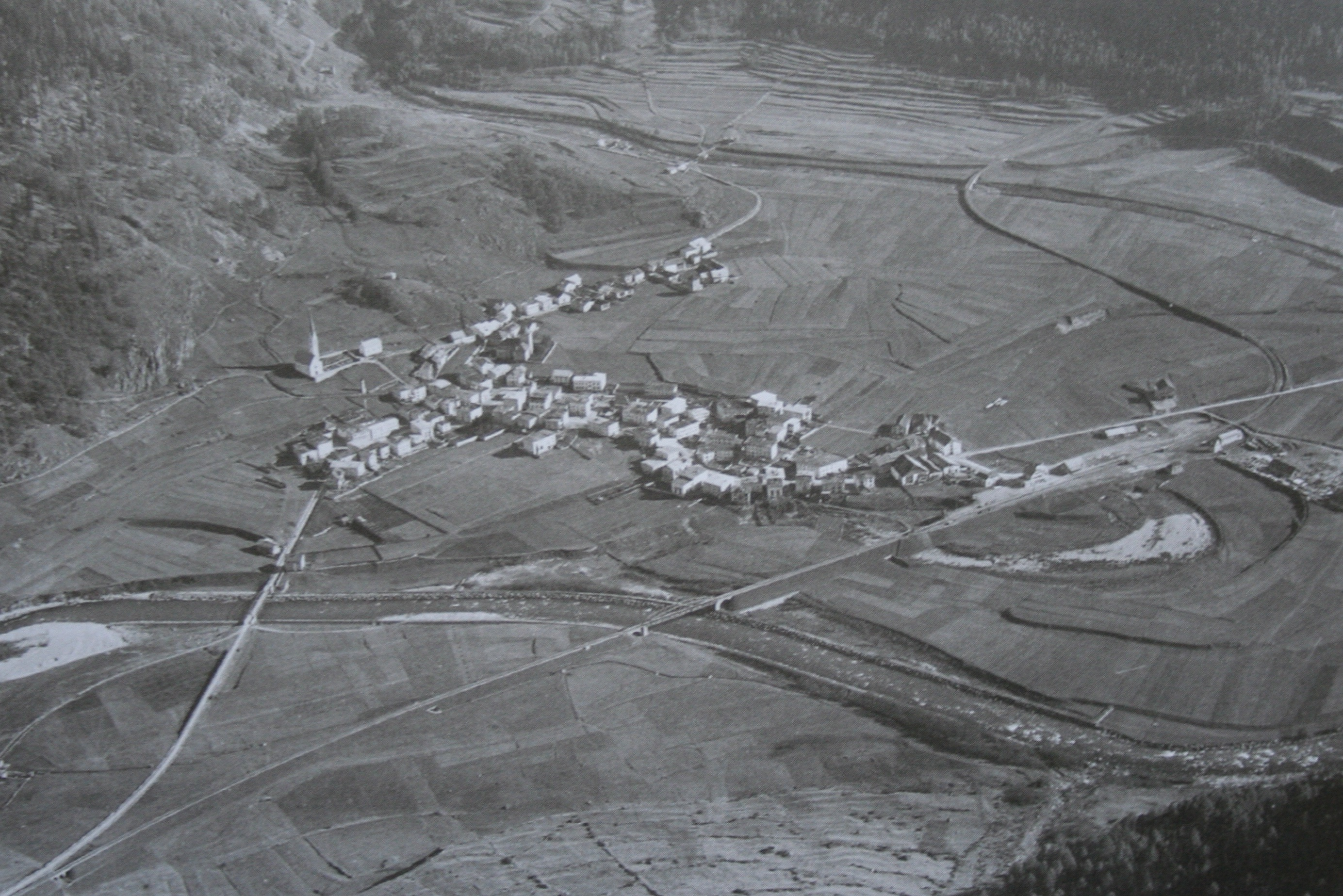
Zernez on an aerial photography by Walter Mittelholzer (1925)

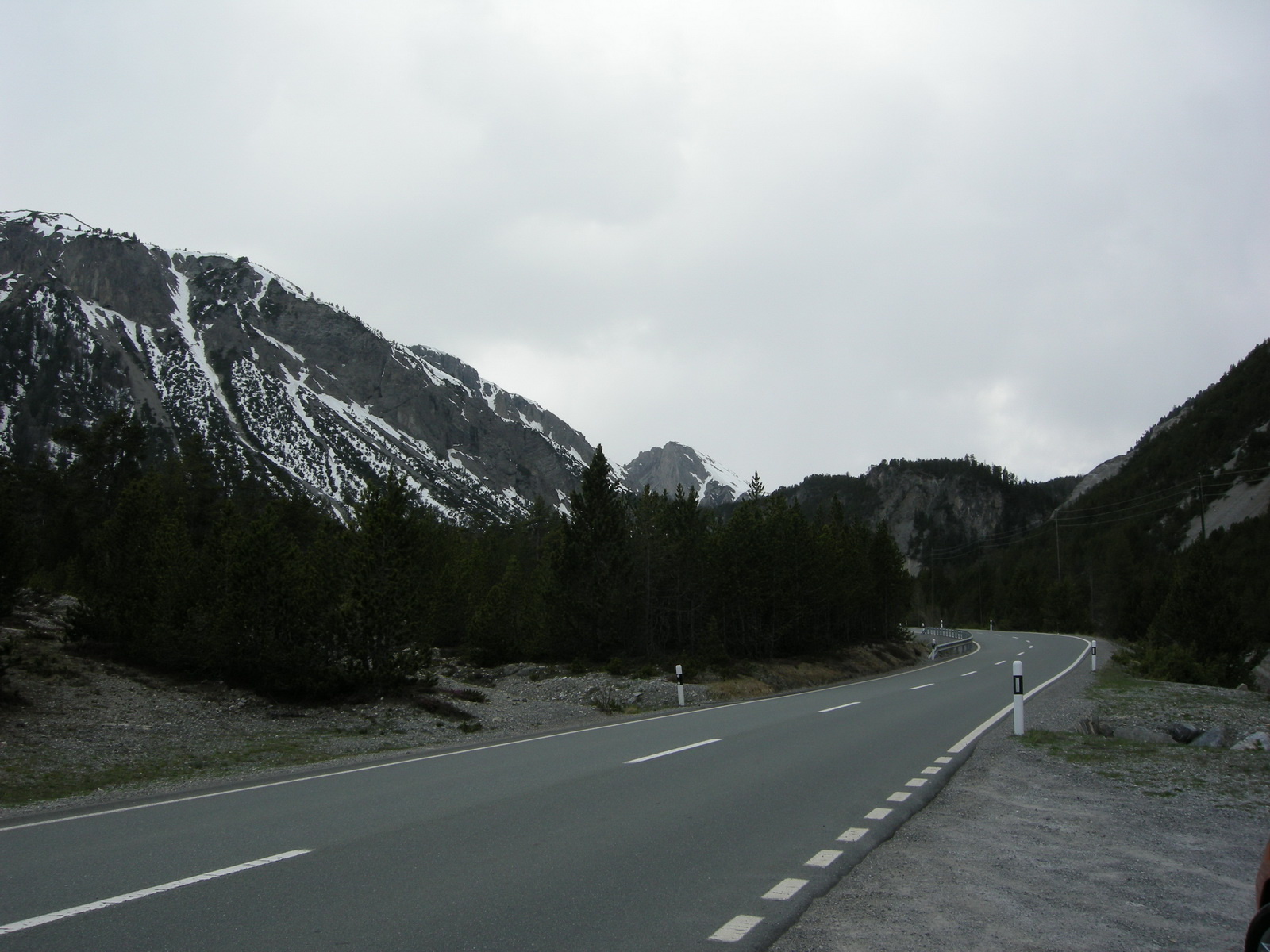
Ofen Pass road

=== Topography ===
After the 2015 merger Zernez had an area of 344.04 km^{2} (132.83 sq mi). Before the merger Zernez had an area, (as of the 2004/09 survey) of 203.91 square kilometers (78.73 sq mi). Of this area, about 7.8% is used for agricultural purposes, while 35.6% is forested. Of the rest of the land, 0.7% is settled (buildings or roads) and 55.9% is unproductive land. Over the past two decades (1979/85-2004/09) the amount of land that is settled has increased by 8 ha (20 acres) and the agricultural land has decreased by 130 ha (320 acres).

Until 2017 the municipality was located in the Sur Tasna sub-district of the Inn district, after 2017 it was part of the Engiadina Bassa/Val Müstair Region. It is located along the Ofen Pass road into the Engadine. It consists of the village of Zernez and the section of Brail.

Lai da Ova Spin is a compensation reservoir on the river Spöl. It is located in the upper areas of the Lower Engadine valley (Romansh: Engiadina Bassa). It is located at an elevation of 1,473 m (4,833 ft) and is connected to the railway network of the Rhätische Bahn. In Zernez, the stream Spöl empties into the Inn (Romansh: En).

=== Climate ===
Zernez has an average of 102.7 days of rain per year and on average receives 752 mm (29.6 in) of precipitation. The wettest month is August during which time Zernez receives an average of 103 mm (4.1 in) of precipitation. During this month there is precipitation for an average of 11.4 days. The driest month of the year is February with an average of 37 mm (1.5 in) of precipitation over 11.4 days.

== Demographics ==
=== Population ===
Zernez has a population (as of December 2020) of 1,506. As of 2013, 18.6% of the population are resident foreign nationals. Over the last 3 years (2010-2013) the population has changed at a rate of 1.14%. The birth rate in the municipality, in 2013, was 8.7 while the death rate was 6.9 per thousand residents.

As of 2013, children and teenagers (0–19 years old) make up 20.6% of the population, while adults (20–64 years old) are 59.4% and seniors (over 64 years old) make up 19.9%.

In 2013 there were 508 private households in Zernez. Of the 282 inhabited buildings in the municipality, in 2000, about 29.4% were single family homes and 38.3% were multiple family buildings. Additionally, about 43.6% of the buildings were built before 1919, while 10.6% were built between 1991 and 2000. In 2012 the rate of construction of new housing units per 1000 residents was 5.22. The vacancy rate for the municipality, in 2014, was 4.03%.

The historical population is given in the following table:

=== Historic Population ===
The historical population is given in the following chart:

note: Population increase in 1910 due to railway construction

=== Languages ===
Most of the population (as of 2000) speaks (Rhaeto-)Romansh (61.1%), with German being second most common (31.3%) and Italian being third ( 4.4%). The Romansh speaking majority speak the Vallader dialect. In 1880 there were 84% of the population spoke Romansh as their first language, in 1900 it was 79% and in 1941 it was 78%. In 1990 about 81% understood Romansh and in 2000 it was 80%.

Languages in Zernez
Languages	Census 1980		Census 1990		Census 2000	
Languages	Number	Percent	Number	Percent	Number	Percent
German	207	22.50%	243	27.96%	300	31.28%
Romansh	645	70.11%	571	65.71%	586	61.11%
Italian	56	6.09%	41	4.72%	42	4.38%
Population	920	100%	869	100%	959	100%

=== Education ===
In Zernez about 72.5% of the population (between age 25-64) have completed either non-mandatory upper secondary education or additional higher education (either university or a Fachhochschule).

=== Economy ===
As of 2012, there were a total of 653 people employed in the municipality. Of these, a total of 63 people worked in 18 businesses in the primary economic sector. The secondary sector employed 208 workers in 27 separate businesses. Finally, the tertiary sector provided 382 jobs in 88 businesses. In 2013 a total of 5.2% of the population received social assistance.

=== Criminality ===
In 2014 the crime rate, of the over 200 crimes listed in the Swiss Criminal Code (running from murder, robbery and assault to accepting bribes and election fraud), in Zernez was 52 per thousand residents, slightly lower than the national average (64.6 per thousand). During the same period, the rate of drug crimes was 7.8 per thousand residents. The rate of violations of immigration, visa and work permit laws was 0.9 per thousand residents, which is only 18.4% of the rate for the entire country.

== Politics ==
In the 2011 federal election the most popular party was the SVP with 45.8% of the vote. The next three most popular parties were the BDP (25.6%), the SP (9.6%) and the FDP (8.0%). In the federal election, a total of 443 votes were cast, and the voter turnout was 58.2%.

In the 2007 federal election the most popular party was the SVP which received 45.9% of the vote. The next three most popular parties were the SPS (23.4%), the FDP (20.6%) and the CVP (7.2%).

== Sights ==
=== Heritage sites of national significance ===
The abandoned village of Gonda, the Reformed Church in Zernez, the Schloss Wildenberg (Wildenberg Castle), the Palazzo Bezzola and the Richtstätte/Galgen Fuorcha are listed as Swiss heritage sites of national significance.

The church was first built in 1367. When the Protestant Reformation entered Zernez in 1553, the church was stripped of all the statues and paintings. Then, in 1609 the old church was replaced with a new baroque building, though the romanesque bell tower of the old church was retained.

The castle was built in the 12th Century but was rebuilt into a baroque castle later. Since 1956 it has served as the town hall.

=== Other sights ===
In addition to the four Swiss Heritage Sites of National Significance, Zernez has several other notable sites. These include the gothic catholic chapel of St. Sebastian, the Morenturm, the Swiss National Park and park house, the abandoned tower of La Serra and in Brail, a medieval Reformed church.

The chapel of St. Sebastian stopped being used as a catholic chapel following the Reformation. In 1952 it was put back into service as a chapel. The Morenturm is a medieval tower house in the village. The Swiss National Park, as of 2009, is the only National Park in Switzerland. It has an area of 174.2 km^{2} (67.3 sq mi) and is the largest protected area of the country. It was one of the earliest national parks in Europe, being founded on 1 August 1914. The Nationalparkhaus in Zernez is a museum for the National Park. The tower of La Serra was built either in the 13th or 14th Century, though it could have been built as late as just before the Swabian War in 1495. During the Bündner Wirren (or Confusion of the Leagues) it was reinforced and a regiment from Schauenstein was stationed there. After the Confusion, it was abandoned and fell into disrepair. In 1996–98 it was repaired and reinforced.

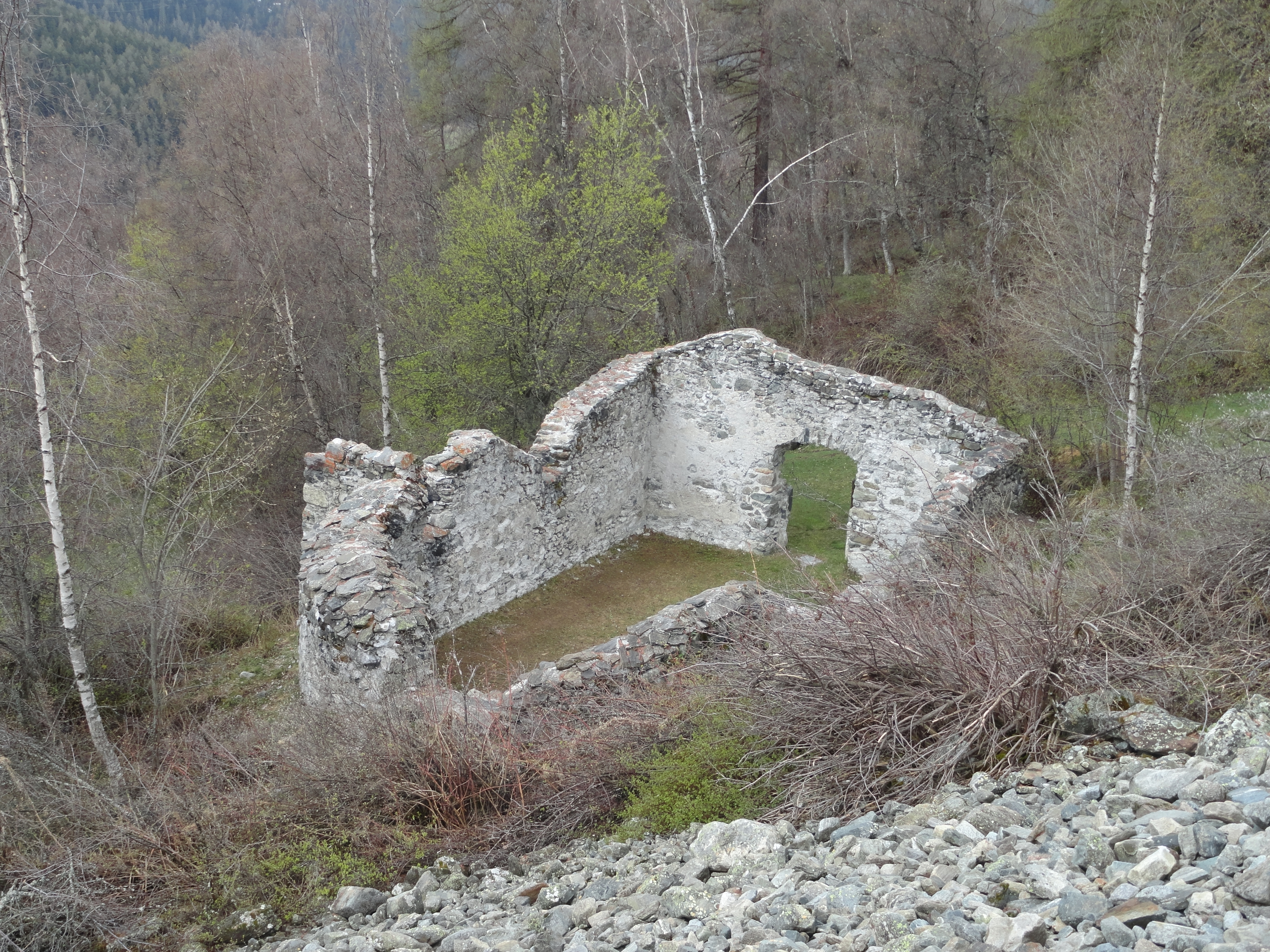
Abandoned village of Gonda

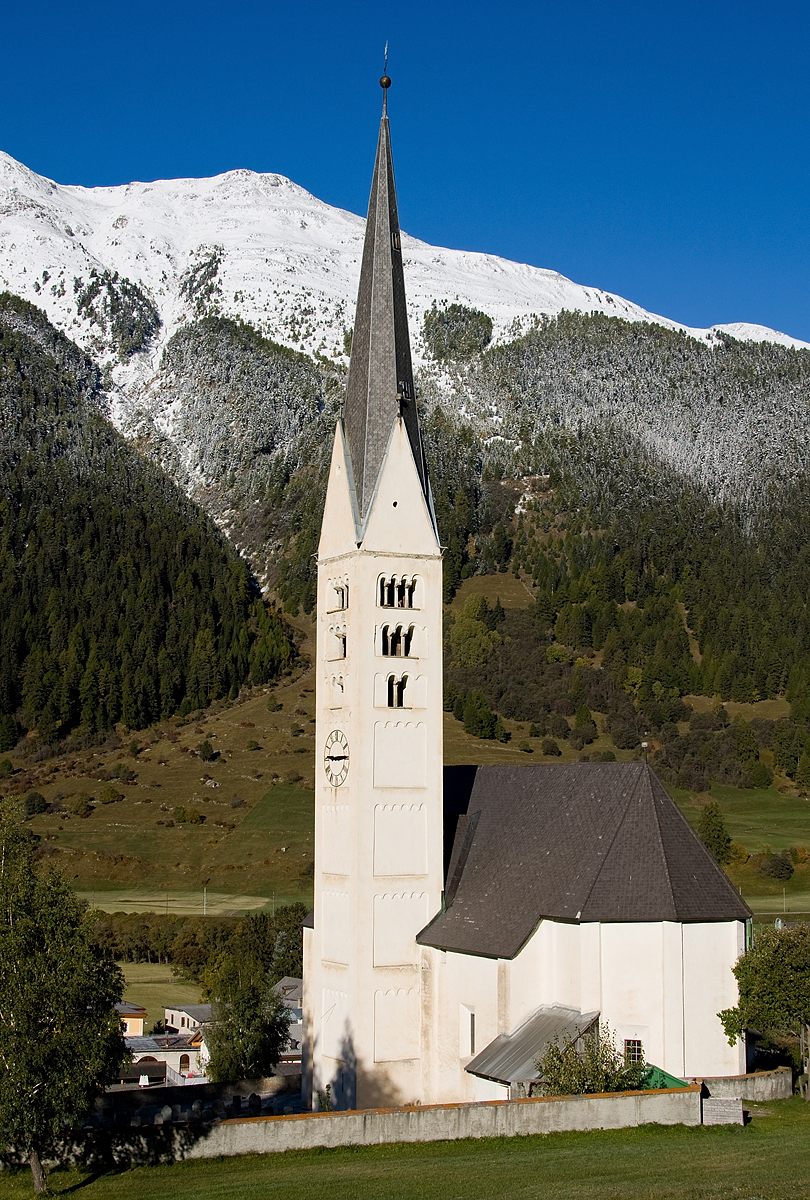
Reformed Church in Zernez

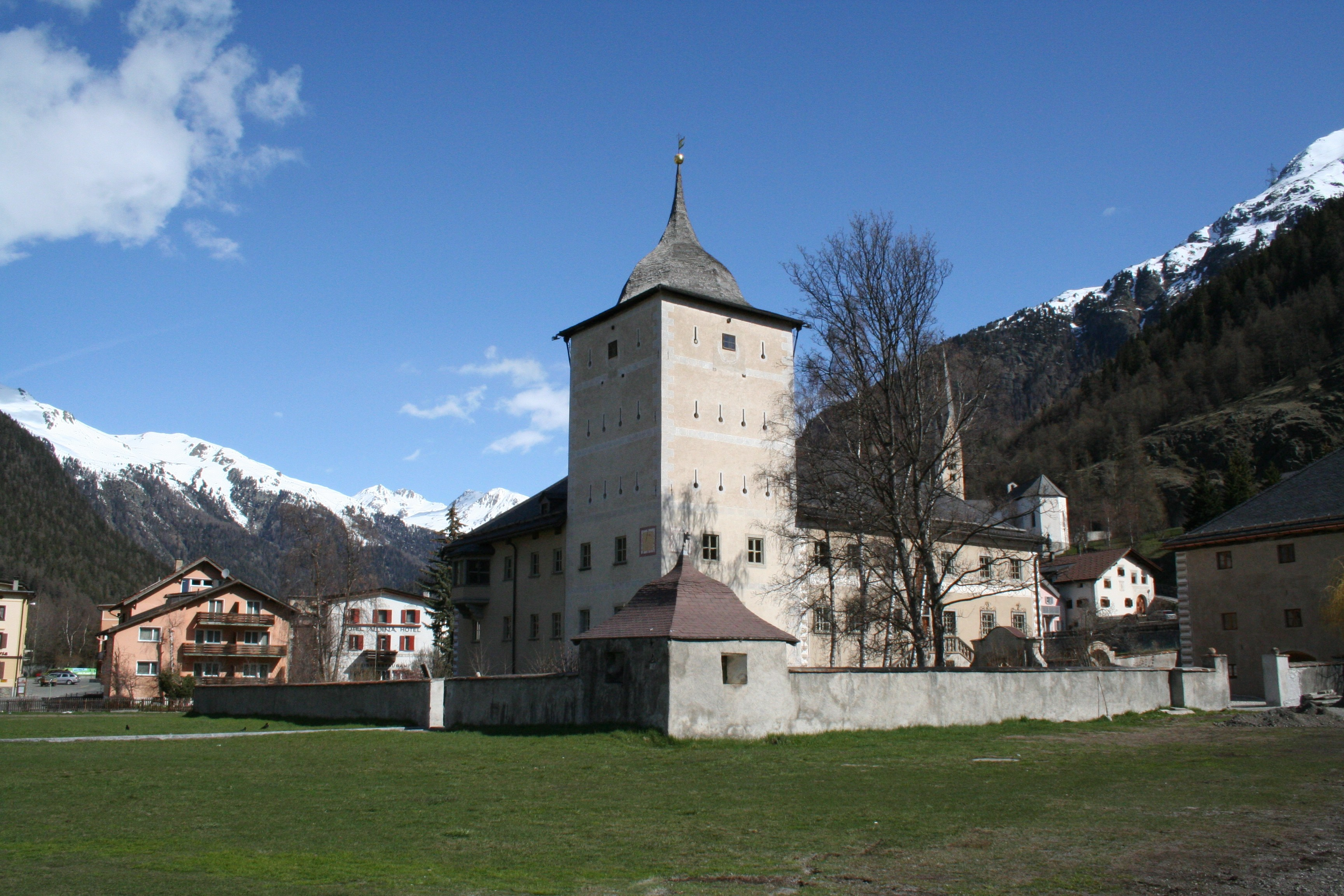
Schloss Planta-Wildenberg (Planta-Wildenberg Castle), medieval tower-house with Baroque annexe

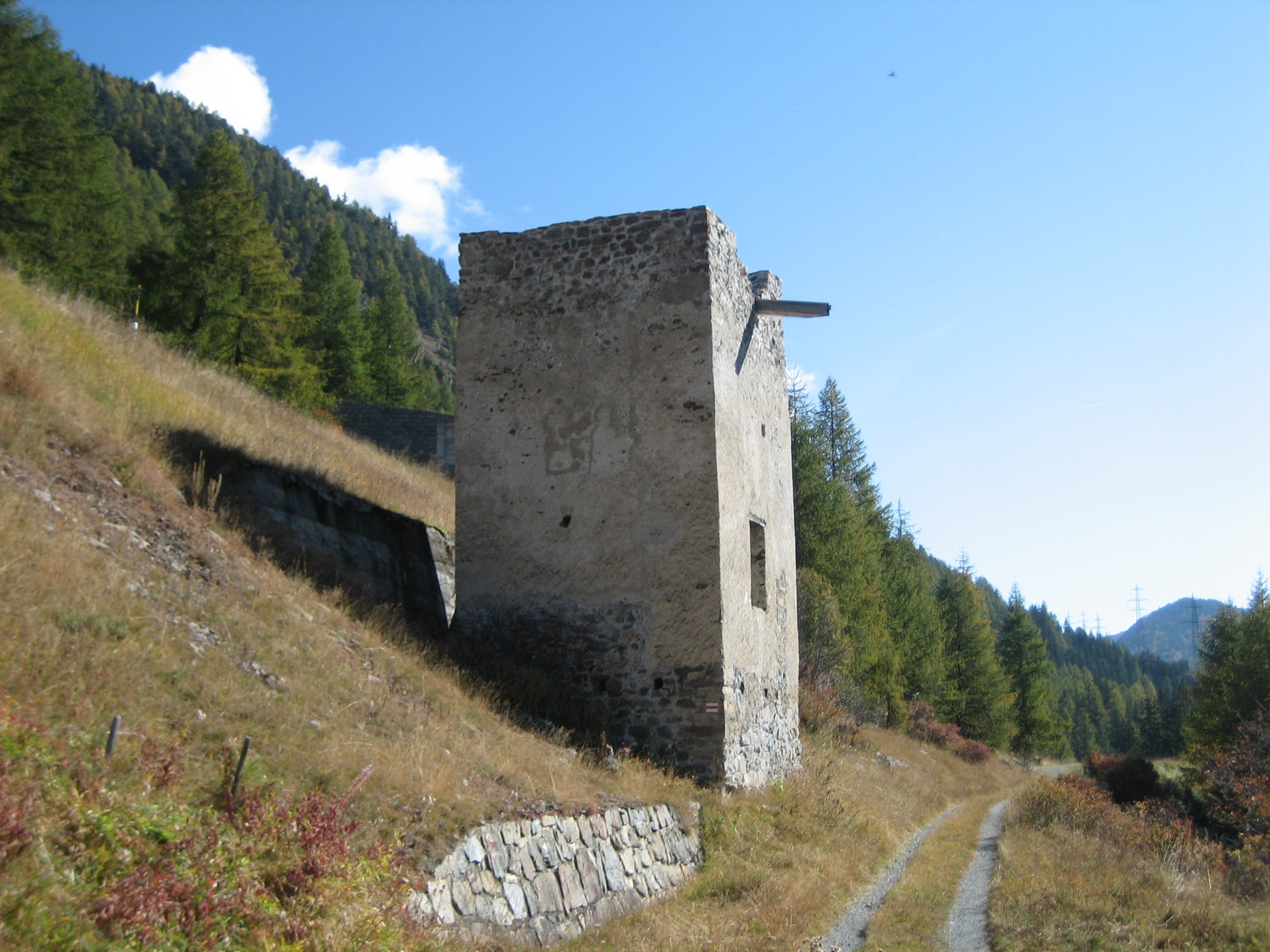
La Serra tower outside Zernez

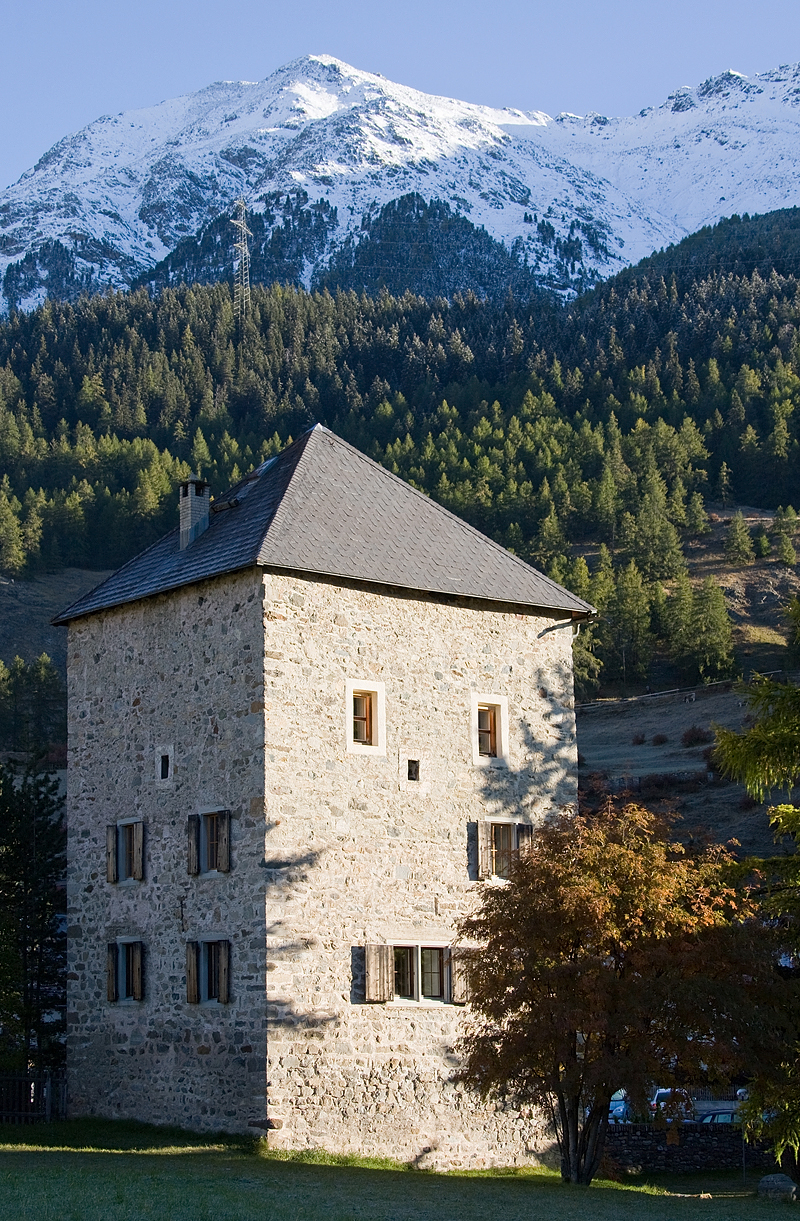
Morenturm, a medieval tower house

== Transportation ==
The municipality has four railway stations: Zernez, Susch, Sagliains, and Lavin. All four are located on the Bever–Scuol-Tarasp line and between them have with regular service to Disentis/Mustér, St. Moritz, Landquart, Scuol-Tarasp, and Pontresina.
