= Spöl =

River in Switzerland and Italy

Coordinates: 46°42′N 10°06′E

Spöl or Aqua Granda
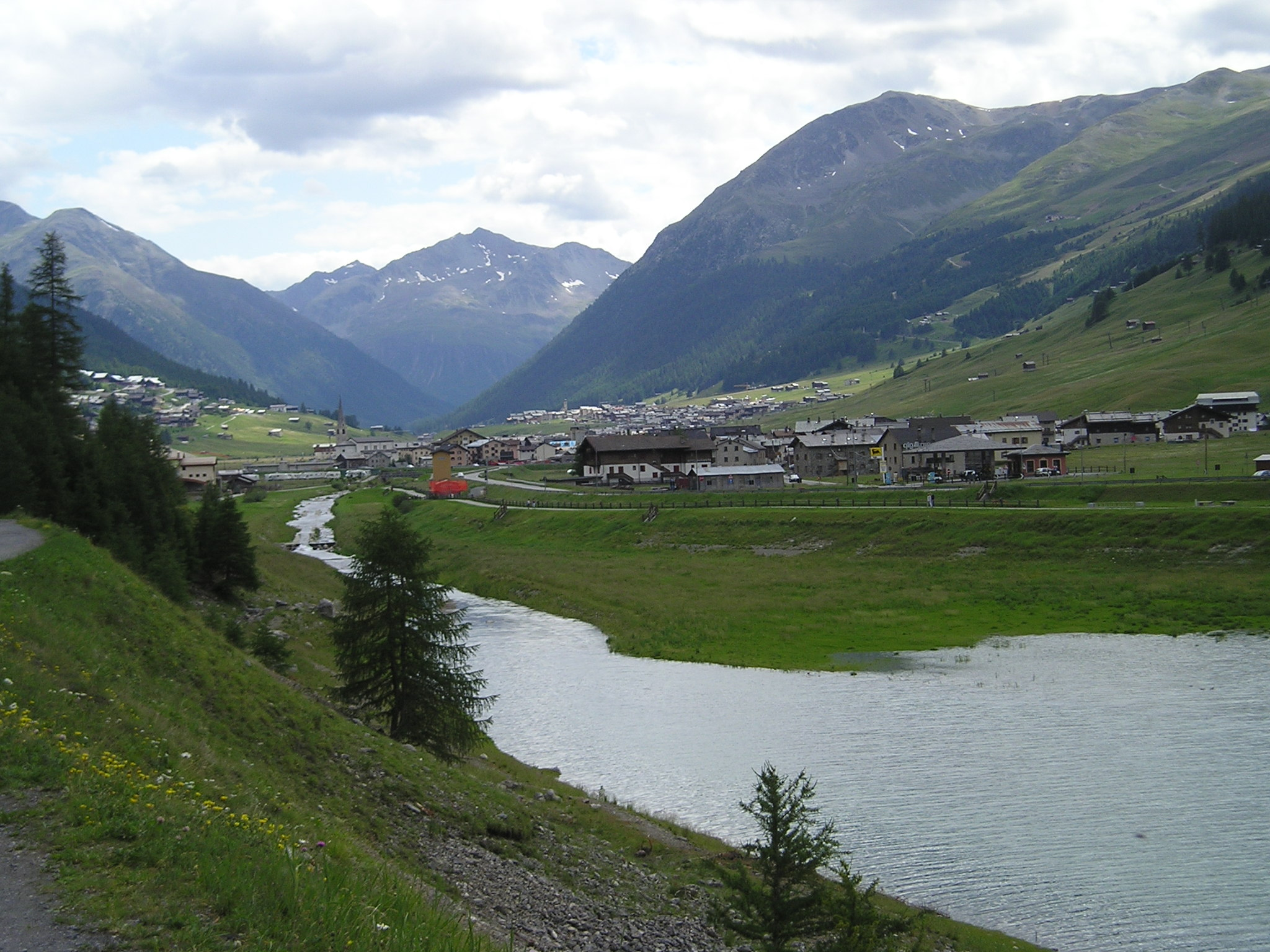

Location
- Country: Italy, Switzerland

Physical characteristics
- Source
  - location: Forcola di Livigno, Italy
  - elevation: 2,315 m (7,595 ft)
- Mouth
  - location: The Inn at Zernez, Switzerland
- Length: 28 km (17 mi)

Basin features
- Progression: Inn→ Danube→ Black Sea

The Spöl or Aqua Granda is an Italian and Swiss river and is a right tributary of the Inn.

The source of the river is near Corno di Campo in the Province of Sondrio in Italy. It flows northeast past Livigno and into Lago di Livigno. It exits the lake at the Italian/Swiss border and flows northwest through Parc Naziunal Svizzer before emptying into the Inn near Zernez.

Despite rising in Italy, the river is a tributary of the Inn, and the Danube, rather than of the Po. In other words, its valley is on the northern side of the Alpine watershed. In this area geographical and political boundaries do not coincide.

Due to an international treaty, an artificial lake, Lago di Livigno, was created by Engadiner Kraftwerke in the 1960s, with a dam on the border. This caused the flooding of part of the ancient village of Livigno. Despite indemnification, not all inhabitants were willing to leave this part of the valley.

The reservoir has a capacity of 164 million cubic metres (133,000 acre⋅ft). Its minimum and maximum water levels above sea level are at 1,700 metres (5,600 ft) and 1,805 metres (5,922 ft) respectively. Since its construction, this lake had been off-limits for any activity, such as wind-surfing or rowing, until the summer of 2005, when Italy's National Rowing team was authorized to train on the lake.

The same international treaty allowed another electricity company to catch the waters of Aqua Granda and other tributaries above a certain elevation and to transport it through a tunnel to the artificial lakes of Cancano, in Val Fraele, on the other side of the watershed. This has decreased the water level on the river dramatically, with some parts of it left without water, causing strong but ineffective protests by the local population.

Nowadays this river is popular for fishing, virtually the only other use which can be made of it.
