= Battle of Calven =

Battle during the Swabian War

Coordinates: 46.6678°N 10.5105°E

- Part of the Swabian War
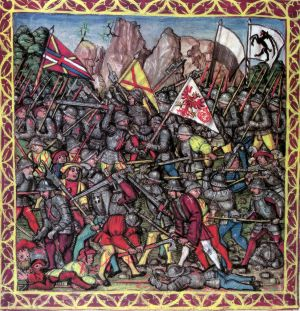
- Depiction of the battle from the Luzerner Schilling, 1513.
Date	22 May 1499
Location	Val Müstair, Vinschgau
Result	Three Leagues victory

Belligerents
Three Leagues of the Grisons, in particular the League of God's House	forces of king Maximilian I of the Holy Roman Empire

Commanders and leaders
Benedikt Fontana †, Dietrich Freuler, Hertli da Capol, Wilhelm Ringk †, Hans von Lombris †	Ulrich von Habsberg

Strength
c. 6,300 infantry	c. 12,000; Swabian Landsknechte and knights, Tyrolian soldiers, Italian mercenaries

Casualties and losses
c. 2,000 dead	c. 5,000 dead

The Battle of Calven (Romansh: Chalavaina)^{1} took place on 22 May 1499 at the exit of the Val Müstair in the Grisons (now part of Switzerland) to the Vinschgau in County of Tyrol (now part of Italy) between the forces of King Maximilian I of the House of Habsburg and those of the free federation of the Three Leagues of the Grisons. It was the decisive battle in the southern Grisons of the Swabian War; after the defeat of the Habsburg troops, the king had to abandon his attempts to control the Engadin and the Val Müstair. The focus of operations in the Swabian War subsequently shifted again to the northern border of the Old Swiss Confederacy.

== Background ==
Since the early Middle Ages, the Bishopric of Chur and the Counts of Tyrol had been disputing and quarrelling over the judicial rights in the lower Engadin, the Val Müstair, and the Vinschgau. When Tyrol came under the rule of the Habsburgs in 1363, Habsburg reeves had tried repeatedly to curtail the rights of the bishopric and to assimilate the valleys to their territories. The people of these valleys opposed these attempts and between 1367 and 1415 united in the League of God's House, one of the Three Leagues of the Grisons.

In the Holy Roman Empire, Maximilian I of the House of Habsburg had become king in 1486. Seven years later, he took over the possessions of his cousin Sigismund of Austria, which included Tyrol, uniting all Habsburg possessions in his hands. The general rise of power of the Habsburgs and their dynastic politics had brought them in conflict with the French kings. Maximilian's second marriage to Bianca Maria Sforza of Milan in 1493 opposed him directly to the French kings who also claimed the Duchy of Milan; a conflict that would escalate to the Italian Wars. The alpine passes in the southern Grisons—and in particular the Umbrail Pass in Val Müstair—had suddenly become strategically important as a direct route from the Tyrol to northern Italy, and the Habsburgs redoubled their efforts to control that region.

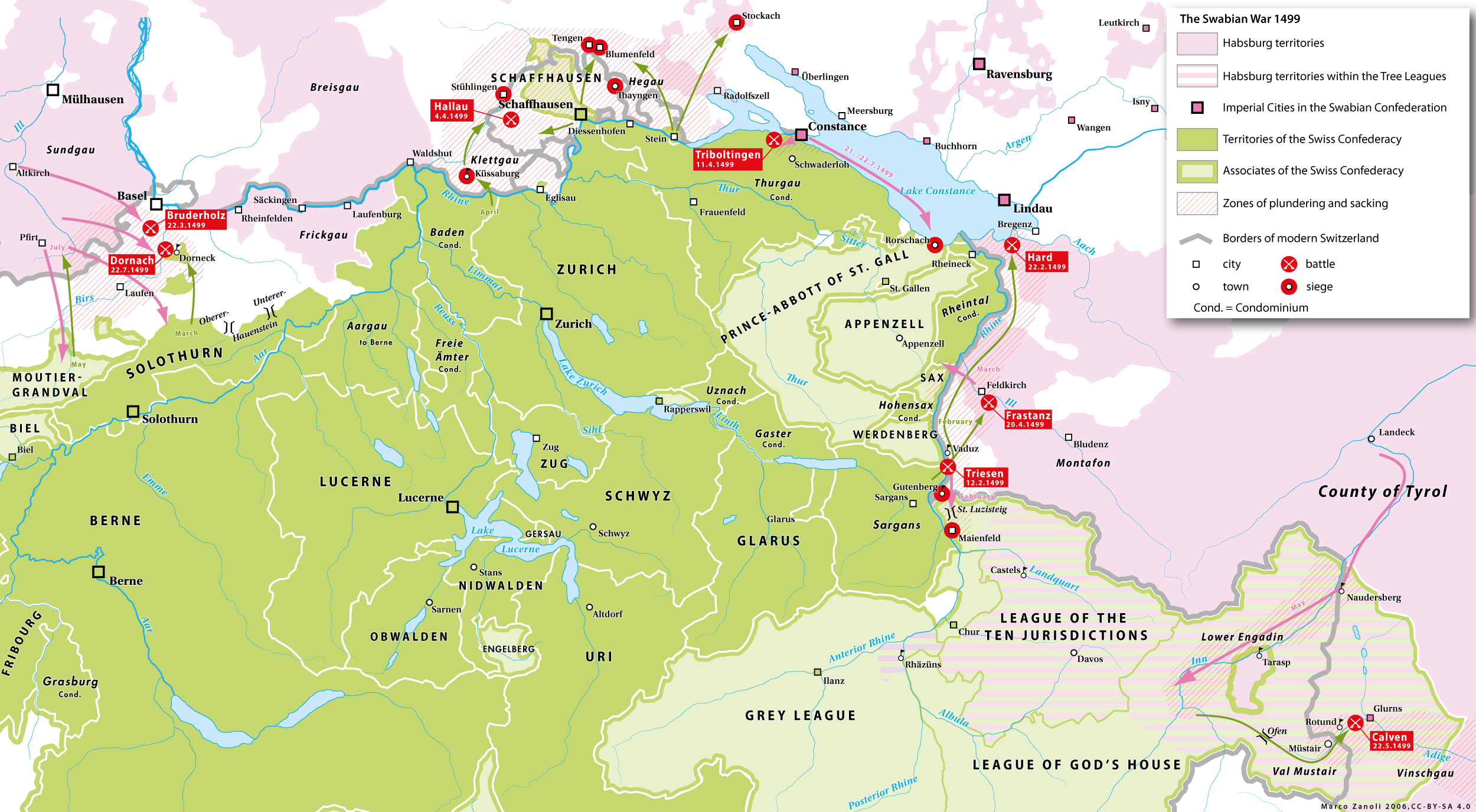
Theater of the Swabian War. The Grisons and Calven are in the lower right corner.

The Habsburg pressure had prompted the Three Leagues of the Grisons to sign a close military alliance with the Old Swiss Confederacy in 1497/98. A raid of Habsburg troops on the Benedictine Convent of Saint John at Müstair on 20 January 1499 had been the immediate cause for the outbreak of the Swabian War, opposing the Swiss Confederacy and the Leagues of the Grisons against the forces of Maximilian, in particular the Swabian League. Part of Maximilian's strategic objective in this war was the control of the Umbrail Pass. Until April 1499, a large Habsburg army with troops from the Swabian League, from Tyrol, and mercenaries from Italy assembled at the villages of Mals and Glurns in the Vinschgau. At Calven, they erected strongly armed wooden fortifications (a so-called Letzi) blocking the entire exit of the Val Müstair. Habsburg troops tried to conquer the Pass dal Fuorn on 11 May 1499, but failed.

== The battle ==
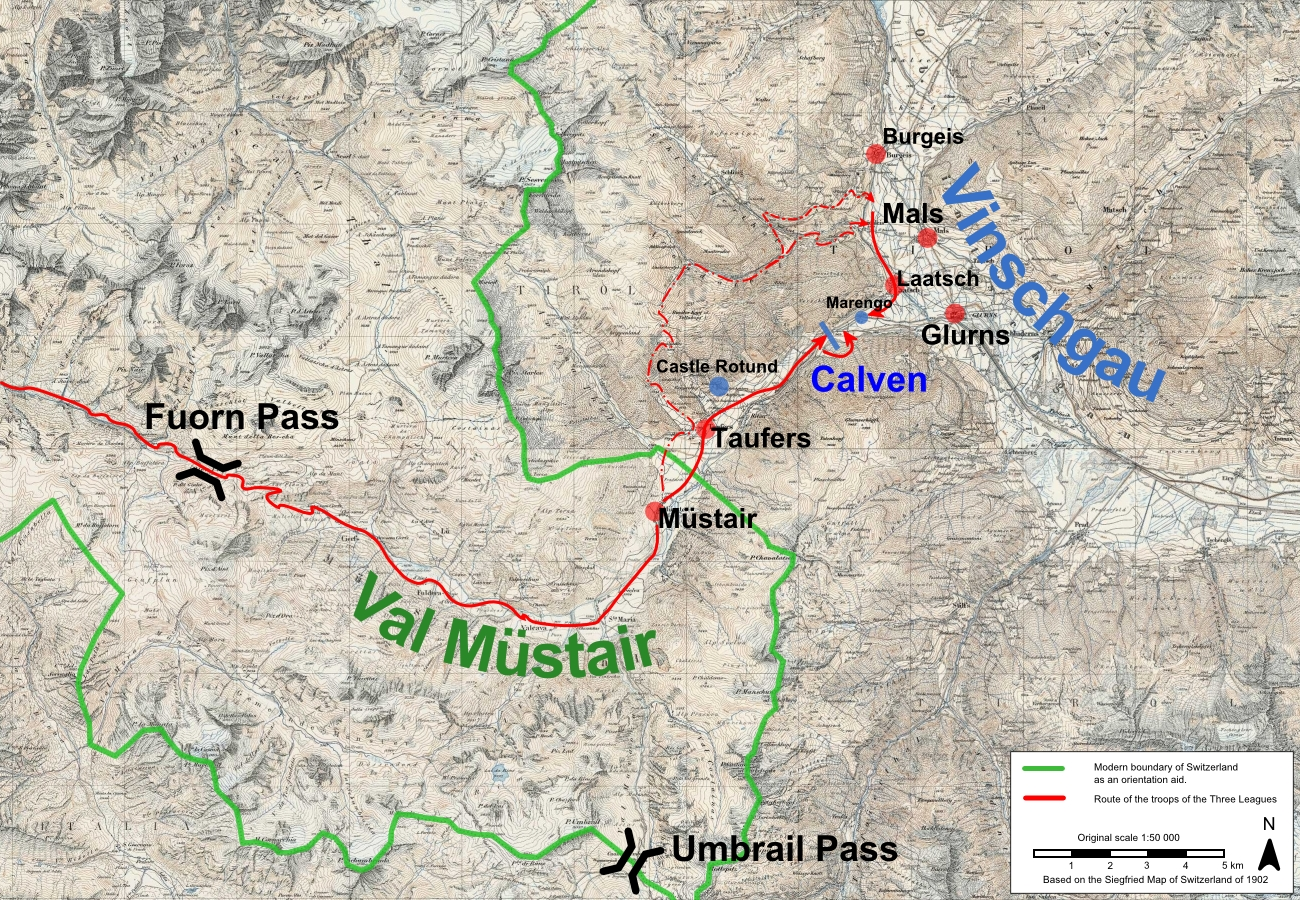
Map of the battle

The bishop's reeve in the southern Grisons, Benedikt Fontana, was forced to leave his seat on the Fürstenburg at Burgeis in the Vinschgau. He had called repeatedly to have strong troops sent to interfere with the preparations of the Habsburg army. The Three Leagues finally complied and assembled an army of about 6,300 men at Zuoz and marched to the Val Müstair. They knew that their time was running out, because they had news of Maximilian being on his way with reinforcements. But the Letzi seemed an insurmountable barrier. The Habsburg army numbered some 12,000 men, of which 2,000 manned the fortifications themselves, while another 1,200 covered the flanks. Castle Rotund at Taufers in front of the barrier was also manned with Habsburg troops, and 200 men guarded the bridge at Marengo behind the Letzi. The rest of the Habsburg army camped at the villages in the Vinschgau.

The mats, as the soldiers of the Three Leagues were called in Romansh, decided to split at Müstair: about 2,000 – 3,000 men led by Wilhelm Ringk and Hans von Lombris were to march over the mountains to bypass the Letzi on the north and to attack the enemy from behind. Because their route was in full view of Castle Rotund, they took off at night. When they arrived in the morning in the Vinschgau, they were immediately engaged by Habsburg troops, who fled in panic, however, when rumours that they numbered 30,000 made the round. But at the Marengo bridge, their advance was stopped. The fleeing troops, united with the 200 Tyrolian soldiers stationed there, managed to hold the bridge.

The other half of the troops of the Three Leagues attacked the fortifications frontally all the same. But the defense was strong; the Letzi was equipped with many cannons, and the mats were driven back several times and suffered heavy losses. The commanders cheered on their soldiers to keep attacking, and threatened to kill them as traitors should they retreat. Their commander Benedikt Fontana fell. A local flanking maneuver over the mountain slopes south of the barrier finally brought the mats the victory. Under simultaneous pressure from all sides, the defenders had to give way. The footsoldiers were overwhelmed and fled, and likewise did the knights, as Pirckheimer reports. They were chased through the Vinschgau and many drowned in the wild mountain rivers.

== Aftermath ==
The victorious troops of the Three Leagues pillaged the Vinschgau valley for three days, burning every house and killing all men over twelve years of age. With their bounty, which included some 300 small and eight larger cannons, they retreated over the Fuorn Pass on 25 May 1499. When Maximilian, who was at that time at Landeck, heard of the defeat, he was enraged and hurried to Glurns, where he arrived on 29 May 1499. 38 hostages from the Engadin were killed in retaliation at Meran, and in June 1499 his troops ravaged the Engadin valley, burning most of the villages up to Samedan. When the Swiss Confederacy sent reinforcements on 18 June 1499 and troops from Bern, Zürich, Uri, and Glarus arrived at Davos, the Habsburg troops cleared the valley.

But the defeat at Calven had put an end to Maximilian's attempt to gain control over the Val Müstair and its passes. His allies of the Swabian League refused to send more soldiers to the Grisons, which was of no interest to them. Maximilian returned to Lake Constance, and subsequently led the operations on the northern border of the Swiss Confederacy. But his troops suffered many defeats, and in September 1499, he had to agree to the Peace of Basel.

Although this peace treaty affirmed the status quo ante bellum and thus the mixed jurisdiction over the Grisons between the Habsburgs, the bishopric of Chur, and the Three Leagues remained, the battle of Calven marked the end of the Habsburg expansion in the Grisons. The victory also strengthened the republican Three Leagues, who would consolidate their alliance in 1524. The Vinschgau, however, became a Habsburg territory in 1618, when the Grisons became a theater in the Thirty Years' War.

== Legend ==
Benedikt Fontana is considered a hero and a freedom fighter in the Grisons. Legend has it that he cheered on his men to attack the Habsburg fortifications with the words "Hei fraischgiamank meiss matts, cun mai ais be ün hom da fear, quai brichia guardad, u chia hoatz Grischuns e Ligias u maa non plü!"—"Go on, my boys, I'm just one man, do not care about me. Today is for the Grisons and the Leagues, or never!". Whether he really used such words is of course uncertain; written accounts that emphasise his role in the battle appeared only in the middle of the 16th century. The legend was further elaborated and became popular in the 19th century, and in 1903, a statue was erected in his honor at Chur.

== Footnotes ==
- ^1 The battle was long known as the "battle of the Malserheide".
