= Lai da Rims =

Lake in the Grisons, Switzerland

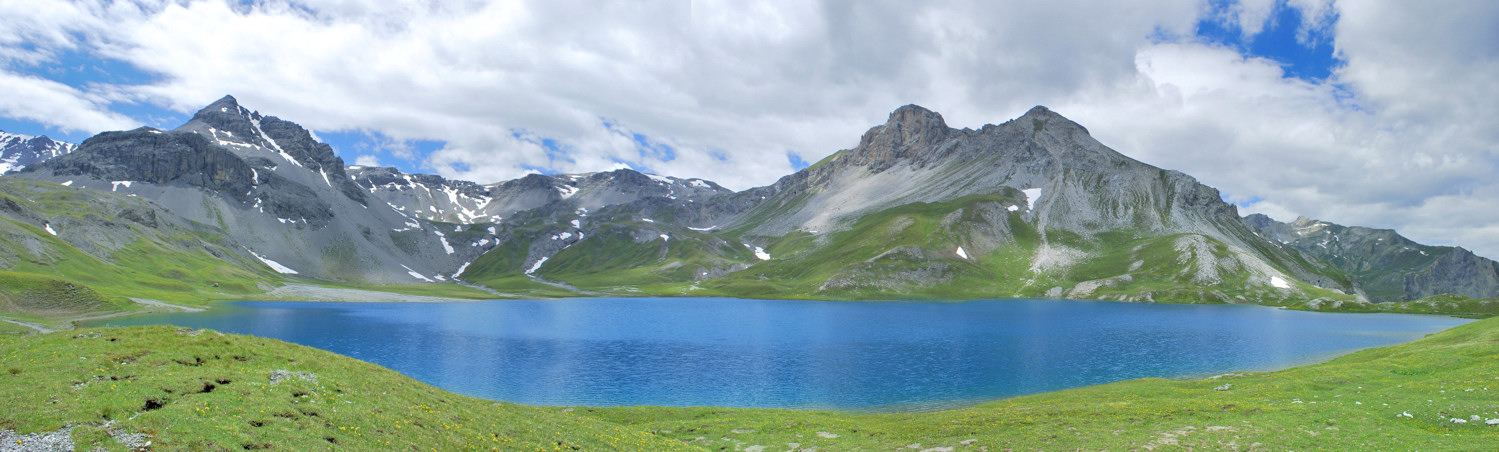

- Location within Canton of Graubünden Location within Switzerland Location within Italy Location within Alps
- Interactive map of Lai da Rims
- Location: Val Müstair, Grisons
- Coordinates: 46°34′N 10°23′E
- Basin countries: Switzerland
- Surface area: 17 ha (42 acres)
- Surface elevation: 2,396 m (7,861 ft)

Lai da Rims (German: Rimsersee) is a lake in Val Müstair, Grisons, Switzerland. The surface area of 17 ha (42 acres) has an elevation of 2396 m. It is the largest lake in the Rom basin, which makes it also the largest lake in the Swiss portion of the Adige basin.

It is not to be confused with Lais da Rims, a set of tarn lakes in the Sesvenna Range near S-charl.

== Geography ==
Lake is located south-east of the Swiss National Park in the Ortler group Southeast above the lake is the Piz Umbrail, which is already on the border with Italy.

Northwest and slightly lower, the fourth stage of the Swiss National Park Panorama Trail (Regional Route 45) runs from Santa Maria Val Müstair through the Val Vau and Val Mora to Buffalora, where there is a bus stop, an inn and the P10 car park.

== See also ==
- List of mountain lakes of Switzerland
- Hydrology of Switzerland
