= Münstertal =

Münstertal may refer to:

- Val Müstair, Switzerland
- Münstertal, Black Forest, Germany

see also

- Taufers im Münstertal, Italy
