= Inn District =

Inn District may refer to:

- Innviertel, a region in Upper Austria
- Inn District, Switzerland
