= Capol =

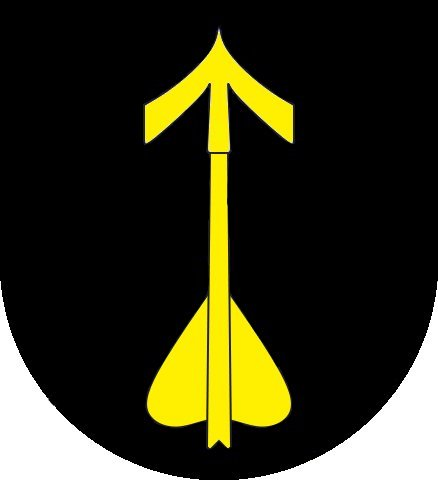
Coat of Arms of the Capol family

The Capol family is an old Swiss noble family from the canton of Grisons. The Capol have lived in this region since the 14th century. Variations of the family name include "Capoll", "Cappol", "Cappoll", "de Capol" and "de Capaulo".

== Origin of the Name ==
The original name Ca Pawli means Paul's house, with Ca or Casa coming from Italian/Venetian and Pawli from Koine Greek. The Capol family also used the Latinized form "a Capaulis" (see the gravestone of Benedict of Capol at the entrance to the Reformed Church in Flims) or "de Capaulo." In old Latin texts, the Capols are also referred to as "Capalus."

== Origin of the Family ==
The family originated in Venice or, more precisely, in Byzantium (971 AD). They are first mentioned in Graubünden in 1377 in Rueun as owners of a farm and in 1410 in Flims with a peasant estate.

== De Capaulo ==
The De Capaulo (Latin for 'from the house of Paul') family originally came from Byzantium and later emigrated to Venice. In Venice, they were known as Vir Nobilis (collateral line of the Polo family). Due to their participation in the 1310 uprising against the Doge in Venice, they were forced to leave in 1311. From there, they migrated via the Misox Valley to the Grisons highlands. A Capaulo is mentioned in the Cartula Donationis of the Charterhouse of Calci (Italy) on September 18, 1111: "Giovanni del fu Opizo dona a Berta del fu Pietro la halfà di tutti i suoi beni, e riceve da Capaulo, per conto della suddetta Berta, un anello d’argento." (Giovanni of Opizo donated half of all his possessions to Berta of Pietro and received from Capaulo, in return for the aforementioned Berta, an silver ring.) A Paulus de Capaulo from Venice is mentioned among the brothers of the Capuchin convent of Santa Margherita Ligure (Italy) around 1315. A Sebastian von Capaulo is mentioned as a Capuchin or provicar in the history of the Tyrolean Capuchin province (1593–1893). The Capol family is named with the de Capaulo surname in various documents: Osvaldus de Capaulo, Volffgang de Capaulo, Susanna de Capaulo, Henriercus de Capaulo, and Juliana de Capaulo.

== Family Chronicle ==
The family chronicle, the "Capoliana," was compiled by Colonel Carl von Capoll (1847–1914) based on genealogical studies by Anton Sprecher von Bernegg-Davos. It is kept in the State Archives of the Canton of Graubünden. The Capolia Saga, published in 2024, delves into the origins and history of the family in detail.

== Capol of Val Müstair ==
The family name Capol appears around 1522 in Santa Maria Val Müstair in the Val Müstair. The Capol family, who served as governors, lived here. They resided in the "Chasa de Capol." In 1506, the future Emperor Maximilian I stayed at the Chasa de Capol.

== Capol of Flims ==
The Capol family served under the Barons of Sax-Misox from 1371 to 1485 in Flims and Gruob. The Sax and De Sacco families also originated in Venice. The Capol family was the one that maintained almost undisputed leadership in the village from the 15th to the 17th centuries. The Capol family of Flims is first documented in the 15th century: In a bishop's leasehold around 1400, the Capols are referred to as "gebure," meaning free farmers. Free farmers owned their own land, which was rare in the Middle Ages. The office of Ammann (village headman) was introduced in Flims in 1427, even before the Bishop of Chur reacquired the rights of lordship from Count Johann Peter Baron of Sax for 4,000 guilders in 1485. The first Capol to become Ammann did not yet have a seal. It was not until 1457 that Otto Capol the Elder used his arrow seal. In 1481, the indebted Johann Peter von Sax sold his Misox estates to Count Trivulzio of Milan. A Milanese document lists "Otto de Capollo fil.qm." (= filius quondam) domini Polli castelanus Verdenberg as his "procurator," demonstrating this ministerialis's connection to his lords, who were active in the then-Diocese of Chur. In 1483, he sold the rights in Gruob to the Bishop of Chur, having previously sold the customs duties in Ilanz to Johann Paul von Chapaul of Ilanz.

== Nobility ==
On February 5, 1481, in Innsbruck, the cousins Hertli and Wilhelm von Capol from Flims received confirmation of their nobility (confirming that the von Capol family had been noble and aristocratic many years ago), confirmation of their coat of arms (confirming their arms and Clement), and elevation to the rank of count (by virtue of Count Isazen's common decree) from Emperor Frederick III. The title of count was necessary for the acquisition of imperial or prince-bishopric fiefs. This is likely connected to the customs rights in Ilanz, which the Capol family had purchased from the Count of Sax around 1483. A copy of the original patent of nobility is located in the State Archives in Chur. This is based on a certified copy of the original from the Salis-Soglio archive dated July 20, 1757 (Andiast), as well as another certified copy dated March 22, 1864 (Chur). In 1489, both finally received a letter of confirmation of nobility and augmentation of their coat of arms (without mention of the title of Count) signed by Emperor Frederick III. The original of this letter is now in the Chur State Archives, and a copy is in the Ulm City Archives. On July 12, 1669, a copy of the letter augmenting the coat of arms was made and certified by the secretary of the Prince-Bishop of Chur and the notary Magister Tobias Zelffe. This letter is also kept in the Ulm City Archives. Individual members of the family used the predicate Junker (squire). The Capols did not use the title Graf (Count) in documents.

== Coat of Arms ==
The coat of arms is described in the first patent of arms from 1481 as featuring a black shield and an arrowhead (ray) with a yellow shaft and white feathers. The later, improved coat of arms of Capol shows a golden, upward-pointing arrow with a silver tip and silver fletching on a black (or red) field. In the Middle Ages, the arrow was also a symbol of power or haste. The Capol coat of arms also served as the village coat of arms of Flims for a long time. The coat of arms is displayed in various locations in Graubünden, St. Gallen, and abroad

== Leading Members ==
- Paul Herkules (Hertli, Hartwig, Härtli) de Capol, son of Härtlin, 1448–1526, Vogt of Lugnez in 1477 and of Fürstenau (1510), Vogt of Fürstenburg Vinschgau and owner of Wiesberg Castle (Burgeis), mayor of Chur, commander-in-chief of the Grisons troops after the death of Benedikt Fontana at the Battle of Calven, envoy of the Three Leagues to the peace negotiations of Basel in 1499 (Peace of Basel), steward of the Bishop of Chur in 1502, commander during the conquest of the Valtellina in 1512. Married first to Gilia de Mont and second to Anna Iter, daughter of the mayor of Chur.
- Sir Johann Gaudenz de Capol (1641–1723), a member of the leading family of Flims, Knight Bachelor of England (Gaudentius de Capell/Capol 23rd of June 1700) and Knights of the Order of Saint Mark of Venice. Built the Schlössli (Little Castle), a manor house, in 1682. He bequeathed the Flims castle to his niece Maria, who was married to Herkules Dietegen von Salis-Seewis. His Unter-Tagstein castle was inherited by his niece Margareta, who was married to Anton von Salis-Seewis. In 1707, he concluded a treaty with the Emperor, the Queen of England, and the States General of the United Netherlands concerning the passage of their peoples through the Grisons region.
- Dr. Herkules de Capol (also de Cappol or Kapool), 1642–1706, physician and officer, second son of Benedikt von Capol. Married to Elisabeth Sprecher von Bernegg from Luzein. In 1684, he owned Girsberg Castle near Guntalingen. Together with his brother Johann Gaudenz, he also owned Untertagstein Castle and estate near Masein. A Protestant officer in French, Spanish, and Dutch service (as colonel of a Grisons Free Company from 1693). In 1702, he served in a Grisons regiment in Holland. In 1706, he served as a brigadier (Dutch general) at the Battle of Ramillies and was killed in action at the Siege of Menen during the War of the Spanish Succession under the command of the Duke of Marlborough. It was thanks to Hercules that the Three Leagues agreed in 1693 to recruit a regiment for the Netherlands.
- Carl (Karl) Friedrich von Capoll, Ulm (Söfingen), (1847–1914), Colonel, author of the Capoliana (now in the State Archives of Graubünden), lived for a time in Flims in his ancestral holiday home, which had been impressively renovated (the house next to the Hotel Bellevue, featuring a Capoll bay window and the former Capoll garden). He was the last representative of the Ulm Capoll line and died as a veteran, volunteering for service in the First World War. His rank was that of lieutenant colonel and battalion commander in the Württemberg Landwehr Infantry Regiment No. 121. He fell on November 3, 1914, at the Battle of Barrenkopf near Hohrodberg in the Vosges Mountains. A beautiful tomb was erected in his honor.

== Manor House ==
The Reiche Stübe, or "Rich Room", of this manor is visitable in the Metropolitan museum. On the floor of the castle the coat of arms of the Capol, a golden arrow on a black shield, is clearly visible. He was owner of different castles in Grisons.

== Soldiers/Mercenary ==
Many Capols have fought for countries other that Switzerland. One family line emigrated to Ulm in Germany in 1637, another to France in 1757. Capols were involved in the Battle of Calven (Grisons) 1499, in the battle of Marciano near Siena (Italy) 1554, in the Battle of Ramillies (Belgium) 1706 and Battle of Barrenkopf or Vosges Mountain (France) in First World War 1914.

== Castle Ownerships ==
Members of the Capol family owned also many castles in Grisons: Castle "Schlössli" Flims, Castle Untertagstein in Thusis, Castle Ringgenberg, Castle Rietberg and Castle Löwenberg.

== Locations ==
The family spread over the world. So members of the family live in Switzerland, Germany, France, United States, Hong Kong and Philippines.

== Literature ==
- Konrad Huber, Raetic book of names, Part 1, Berna 1986
- Robert von Planta and Andrea Schorta, Raetic book of names, Part 2, Berna 1986
- Collection "Capoliana" in Federal Archive of Canton Grisons
- Georges Capol: Capolia. Genealogische Studie zur Chronik der Capol oder Capaul, Uzwil/Vattiz 2024, ISBN 978-3-9525222-1-9.
- Historisch-Biographisches Lexikon der Schweiz
- Die Anfänge der Bündner Aristokratie im 15. und 16. Jahrhundert, Paul Eugen Grimm, Juris Druck + Verlag, 1981
- Schweizerische Gesellschaft für Volkskunde, Band 2, Paul Geiger, 1950
- Atlas der schweizerischen Volkskunde, Band 2, Paul Geiger, 1979
- Die Schweiz: illustrierte Monatsschrift, Band 3, Die Schweiz, 1917
- Geschichte von Graubünden in ihren Hauptzügen, Peter C. von Planta, 1894
- The knights of England : a complete record from the earliest time to the present day of the knights of all the orders of chivalry in England, Scotland, and Ireland, and of knights bachelors, Royal Historical Society, 1906
