= Benedikt Fontana =

- Benedetg Fontana
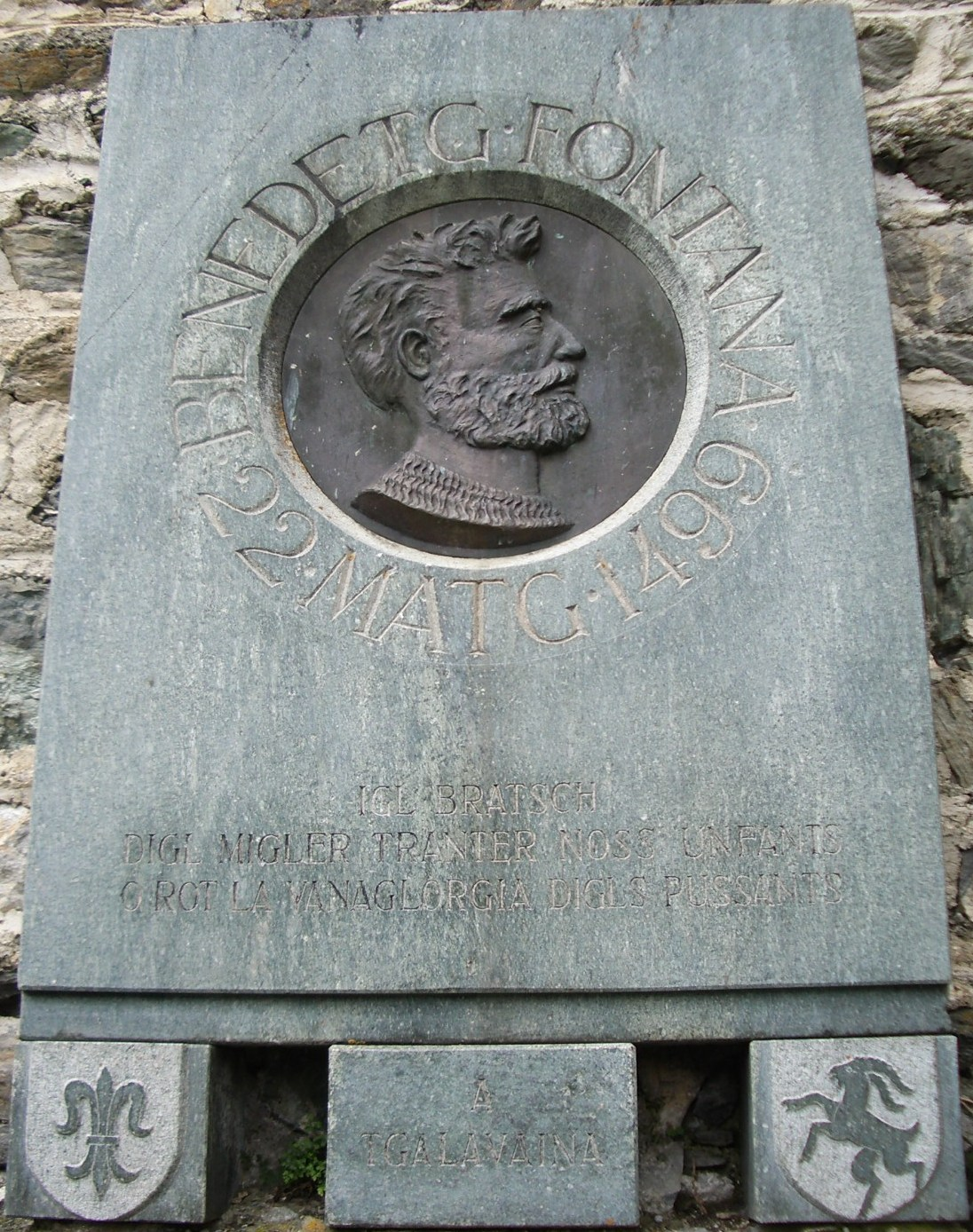
- Memorial to Benedikt Fontana in Riom
- Born: c. 1450; Salouf, League of God's House
- Died: 22 May 1499 (aged 48–49); Val Müstair, Three Leagues
- Military career
- Allegiance: Free State of the Three Leagues

Benedikt Fontana (c. 1450 – 22 May 1499) was a Romansh bailiff and minister who allegedly died a heroic death during the Battle of Calven in 1499, in present-day Grisons, Switzerland.

As a captain in the Three Leagues during the Swabian War, Fontana achieved fame fighting in the Battle of Calven against the Holy Roman Empire. While troops were under the command of Dietrich Freuler from the Swiss Confederacy, Freuler hesitated during an attack and Fontana is said to have assumed control and fought valiantly while shouting "We are Grisons, today or never!". Fontana was mortally wounded during the battle but the Swiss troops defeated the Empire's troops despite being outnumbered 2:1.

According to local legend, Fontana's sword was later thrown into the headwaters of a creek in his hometown of Salouf and has never been found. Fontana remains a legendary figure in Romansh culture to this day, and in 1903 a statue was erected to Fontana in the cantonal capital of Chur.
