= Hydrology of Switzerland =

The five major river basins of Switzerland: Rhine with Aar sub-basin Rhone Po Danube Adige

Hydrology is the science which studies the water cycle as a whole, hence the water exchanges between soil and atmosphere (precipitation and evaporation) but also between the soil and sub ground (groundwater).

Switzerland has a varied and complex hydrological system. The climate of Switzerland gives precipitation under the form of snow and rain and is also responsible for the evaporation of water into the atmosphere. The altitude and climate allow the formation and maintenance of many glaciers that feed rivers from five major European river catchments, through which water leaves the country and joins the sea.

Switzerland is sometimes called the "water tower of Europe". Water from Switzerland reaches all northern, southern, western and eastern parts of Europe.

== Surface water ==
Surface water flows through a network of nearly 65,000 km of rivers, shared between the basins of five European rivers: the Rhine, the Rhone, the Po, the Danube and the Adige. Thus, the hydrological network of Switzerland brings feeds the North Sea, the Mediterranean Sea (Western Mediterranean and Adriatic Sea) and the Black Sea. Among these five rivers, two have their source in Switzerland, the Rhine and the Rhone. The other three rivers have tributaries that originate in Switzerland. While most of the country drains into the North Sea, most of the basins (3 out of 5) drain into the Mediterranean Sea.

All major lakes of Switzerland are located in the Rhine, Rhone and Po basins. Lakes in the Danube and Adige basins are less than 5 km^{2}. All basins except the Adige have glaciers.

Basin	Percent of Swiss territory	Major affluents in Switzerland	Cantons	Largest lakes	Largest glaciers	Empties in	Location
Rhine	68 %	Rhine itself (Anterior Rhine and Posterior Rhine), Aar, Reuss, Thur, Limmat	Aargau, Appenzell Ausserrhoden, Appenzell Innerrhoden, Basel-Stadt, Basel-Landschaft, Bern, Fribourg, Glarus, Grisons, Jura, Lucerne, Neuchâtel, Nidwalden, Obwalden, Schaffhausen, Schwyz, Solothurn, St. Gallen, Ticino, Thurgau, Uri, Valais, Vaud, Zug, Zurich	Lake Constance, Neuchâtel, Lucerne, Zurich	Unteraar, Grindelwald, Gauli, Trift, Hüfi	North Sea	Rhine–Meuse–Scheldt delta in the Netherlands
Rhone	18 %	Rhone itself, Doubs	Fribourg, Geneva, Jura, Neuchâtel, Valais, Vaud	Lake Geneva	Aletsch, Gorner, Fiesch, Oberaletsch, Corbassière, Rhone	Western Mediterranean Sea	Rhone delta in France
Po	9.3 %	Ticino	Grisons, Ticino, Valais	Lake Maggiore, Lugano	Forno, Palü	Adriatic Sea	Po delta in Italy
Danube	4.4 %	Inn	Grisons	Lake Sils, Silvaplana	Morteratsch, Roseg	Black Sea	Danube Delta in Romania and Ukraine
Adige	0.3 %	Rom	Grisons	Lai da Rims	none	Adriatic Sea	North of Po delta in Italy

== Groundwater ==
Groundwater refers to water located beneath the ground surface, as opposed to surface water that forms lakes and rivers. This is called hydrogeology. The nature and location of the groundwater is defined by the geological nature of the soils. In the mid-twentieth century, knowledge of groundwater in Switzerland suffered from significant gaps. They were partially filled in the 1980s and 1990s, with a national research program.

The geological structure of Switzerland was formed by collision of two tectonic plates, the Eurasian Plate to the north and the Adriatic Plate to the south. Geologically, the subsoil is very complex and varied with the Alps in the south, the Jura in the northwest and the plateau between them. Large quantities of water are present in the basement of Switzerland, and form a vast network linked to the geological structures. The underground lake of Saint-Léonard, located in Valais, with its 300 m long and 25 m wide is a notable example.

Each year, one hectare of the Swiss plateau filters an average of four million liters of clean groundwater. According to the Federal Office of Environment, the Swiss basement contains about fifty billion m3 of water. Groundwater is by far the main source of drinking water in Switzerland, covering 80% of requirements. Considering other uses (drinking water and industrial water), groundwater covers 58% of requirements.

== See also ==
- List of rivers of Switzerland
- List of lakes of Switzerland
- List of glaciers of Switzerland
- List of islands of Switzerland
- List of valleys of the Alps
- Geography of Switzerland
- Correction of the Rhône upstream of Lake Geneva
