= Viola Lake =

Lake in Lombardy, Italy

- Location within Lombardy
- Location: Valdidentro (SO, Lombardy)
- Coordinates: 46°25′07″N 10°09′47″E
- Basin countries: Italy
- Max. length: 170 m (560 ft)
- Max. width: 140 m (460 ft)
- Surface elevation: 2,314 m (7,592 ft)

Viola Lake is a small lake in Val Viola, Lombardy, Italy. It is located in the municipality of Valdidentro.
