= Fuldera =

- Former municipality
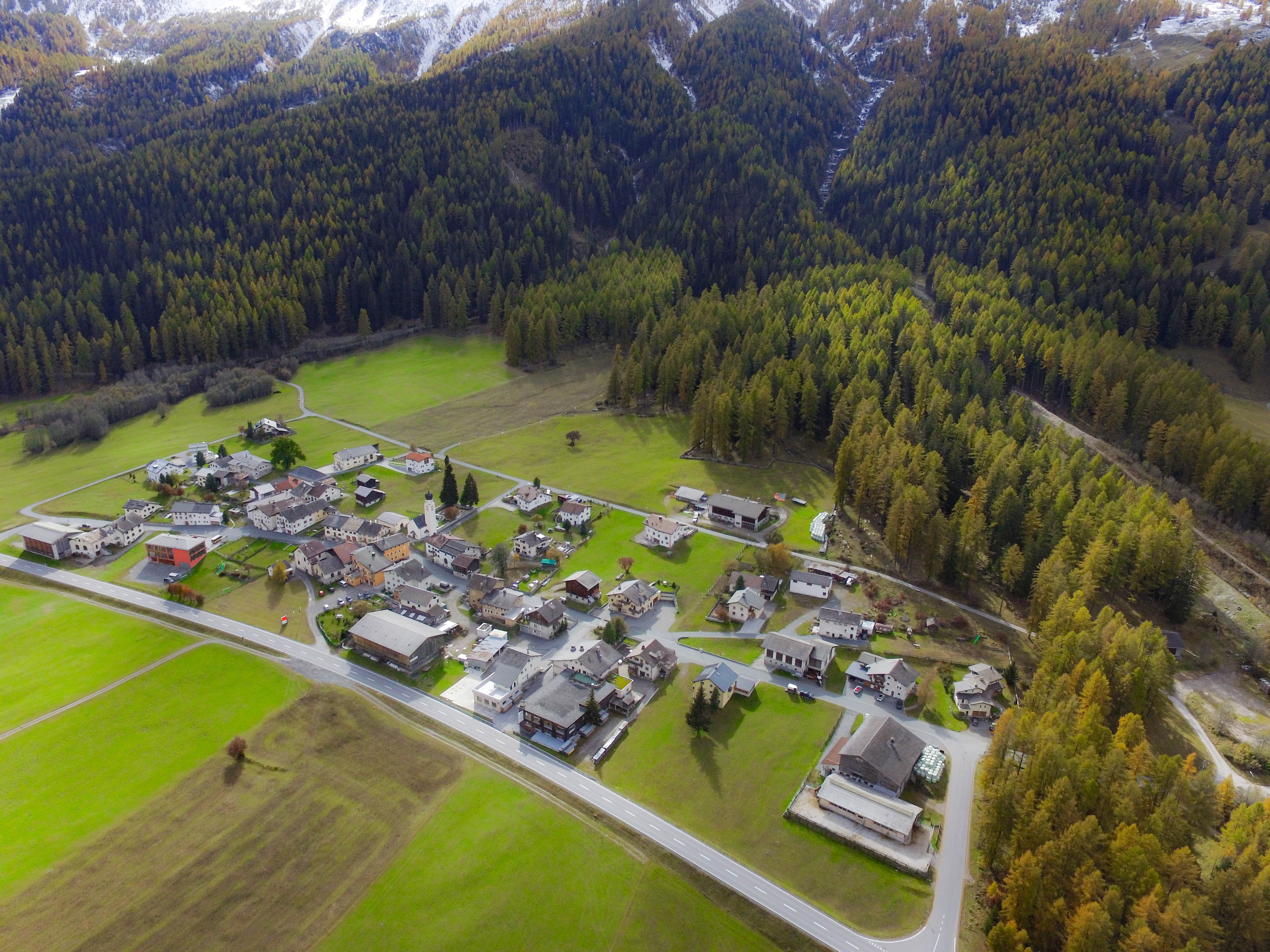
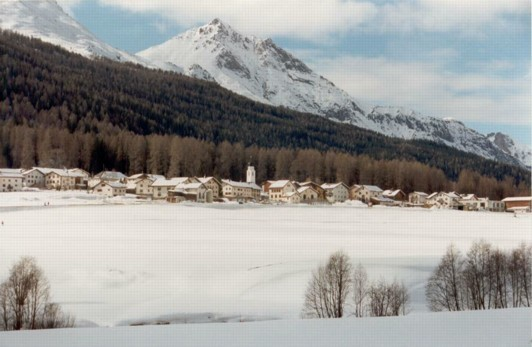

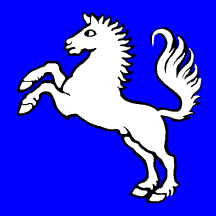
- Flag Coat of arms
- Location of Fuldera
- Location within Switzerland Location within Canton of Graubünden
- Coordinates: 46°36′N 10°22′E
- Country: Switzerland
- Canton: Graubünden
- District: Inn

Area
  - Total: 13.19 km^{2} (5.09 sq mi)
- Elevation: 1,638 m (5,374 ft)

Population (December 2008)
  - Total: 121
  - Density: 9.17/km^{2} (23.8/sq mi)
- Time zone: UTC+01:00 (CET)
  - Summer (DST): UTC+02:00 (CEST)
- Postal code: 7533
- SFOS number: 3841
- ISO 3166 code: CH-GR
- Surrounded by: Lü, Müstair, Tschierv, Valchava
- Website: SFSO statistics

Fuldera is a village in the Val Müstair municipality in the district of Inn in the Swiss canton of Graubünden. In 2009 Fuldera merged with Lü, Müstair, Santa Maria Val Müstair, Tschierv and Valchava to form the municipality of Val Müstair.

== History ==
Fuldera is first mentioned in 1322 as Faldiera.

== Geography ==
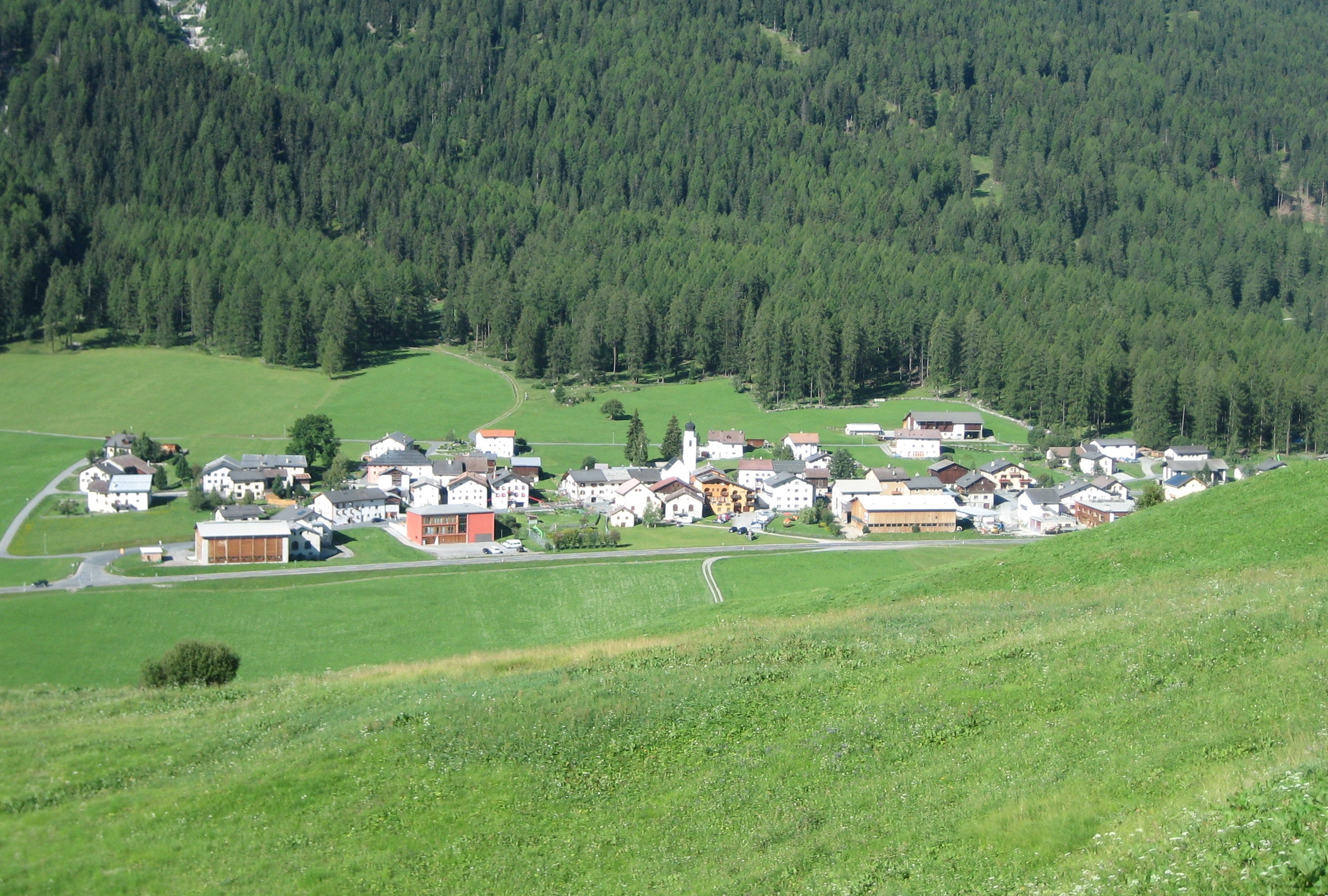
Fuldera village

Fuldera had an area, as of 2006, of 13.2 km^{2} (5.1 sq mi). Of this area, 24.9% is used for agricultural purposes, while 37.2% is forested. Of the rest of the land, 1.4% is settled (buildings or roads) and the remainder (36.4%) is non-productive (rivers, glaciers or mountains).

The village is located in the Val Müstair sub-district (now Val Müstair municipality) of the Inn district. It is located on the right side of the Rombach. It consists of the larger Fuldera-Dora and the smaller Fuldera-Daint.

== Demographics ==
Fuldera had a population (as of 2008) of 121, of which 6.6% are foreign nationals. Over the last 10 years the population has decreased at a rate of -3.2%.

As of 2000, the gender distribution of the population was 47.9% male and 52.1% female. The age distribution, as of 2000, in Fuldera is; 20 children or 17.4% of the population are between 0 and 9 years old. 12 teenagers or 10.4% are 10 to 14, and 1 teenager is 15 to 19. Of the adult population, 10 people or 8.7% of the population are between 20 and 29 years old. 20 people or 17.4% are 30 to 39, 12 people or 10.4% are 40 to 49, and 10 people or 8.7% are 50 to 59. The senior population distribution is 16 people or 13.9% of the population are between 60 and 69 years old, 6 people or 5.2% are 70 to 79, there are 8 people or 7.0% who are 80 to 89.

In the 2007 federal election the most popular party was the SVP which received 44.2% of the vote. The next three most popular parties were the SPS (29.4%), the CVP (18.5%) and the FDP (5.9%).

In Fuldera about 81.8% of the population (between age 25-64) have completed either non-mandatory upper secondary education or additional higher education (either University or a Fachhochschule).

Fuldera has an unemployment rate of 1.63%. As of 2005, there were 13 people employed in the primary economic sector and about 6 businesses involved in this sector. 18 people are employed in the secondary sector and there are 2 businesses in this sector. 17 people are employed in the tertiary sector, with 6 businesses in this sector.

The historical population is given in the following table:

year	population
1835	179
1850	123
1900	98
1950	118
2000	115
2008	121

== Languages ==
Most of the population (as of 2000) speaks Rhaeto-Romance (74.8%), with German being second most common (23.5%) and Italian being third (0.9%). The Romansh speaking population speak the Vallader dialect. Between 1880 and 1980 most of the population spoke Romansh as their first language (1880: 80%, 1941 89% and 1980 95%). In 1990 93% of the population understood Romansh, even if it wasn't their first language, and in 2000 92% understood it.

Languages in Fuldera
Languages	Census 1980		Census 1990		Census 2000	
Languages	Number	Percent	Number	Percent	Number	Percent
German	5	5.00%	17	16.19%	27	23.48%
Romanish	95	95.00%	87	82.86%	86	74.78%
Italian	0	0.00%	1	0.95%	1	0.87%
Population	100	100%	105	100%	115	100%
