= Inn District, Switzerland =

Coordinates: 46°48′N 10°17′E

Inn District Bezirk Inn District d'En
- District
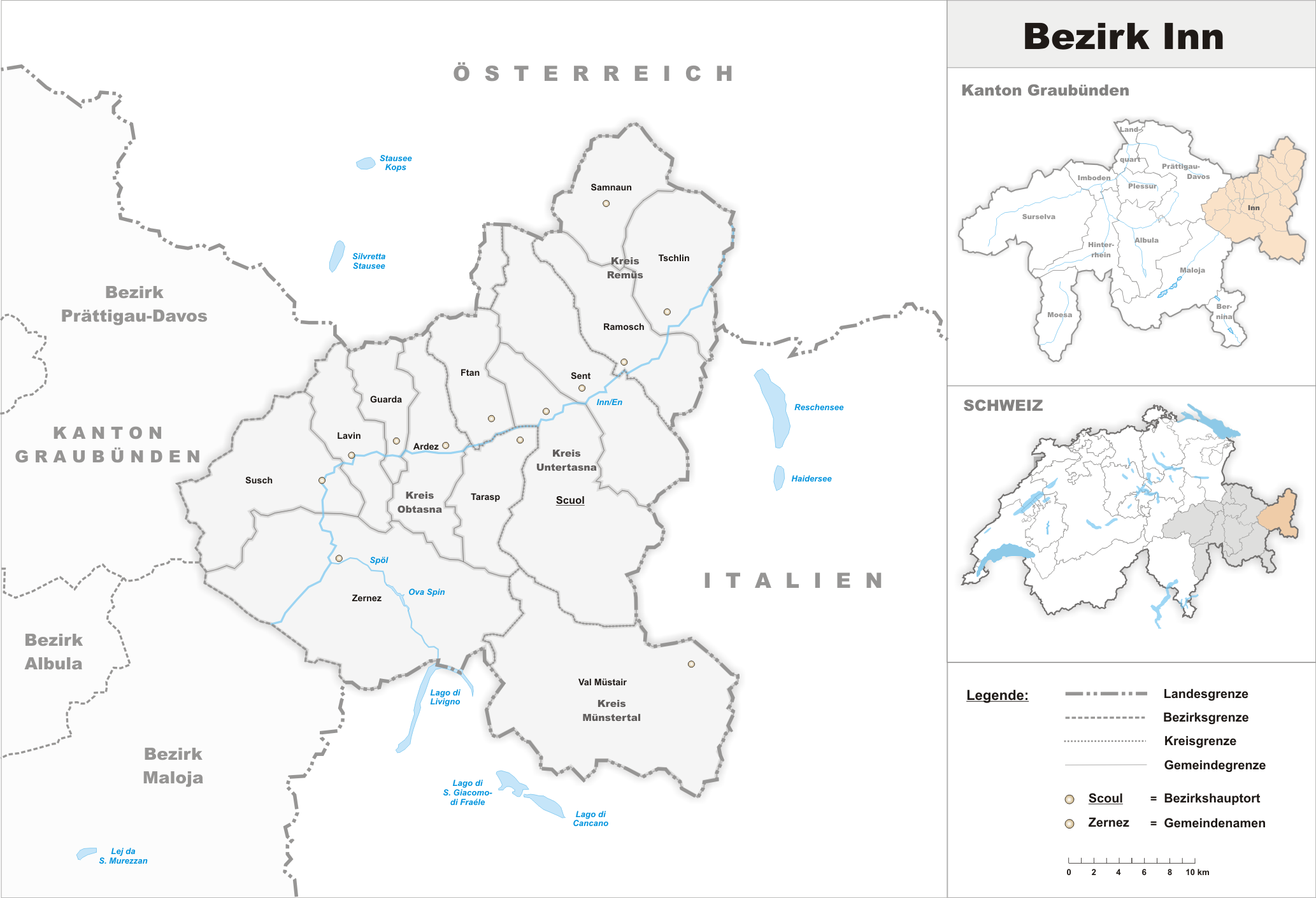
- Country: Switzerland
- Canton: Graubünden
- Capital: Scuol

Area
  - Total: 1,196.56 km^{2} (461.99 sq mi)

Population (2020)
  - Total: 9,476
  - Density: 7.919/km^{2} (20.51/sq mi)
- Time zone: UTC+1 (CET)
  - Summer (DST): UTC+2 (CEST)
- Municipalities: 7

Inn District (Romansh: District da l'En) is a former administrative district in the canton of Graubünden, Switzerland. It had an area of 1,196.77 km^{2} (462.08 sq mi) and had a population of 9,476 in 2015. It was replaced with the Engiadina Bassa/Val Müstair Region on 1 January 2017 as part of a reorganization of the Canton.

It consisted of four Kreise (sub-districts) and seven municipalities:

Ramosch (Remüs) sub-district
Municipality	Population (31 December 2020)	Area (km^{2})
Samnaun	784	56.18
Valsot	826	158.96

Suot Tasna (Untertasna) sub-district
Municipality	Population (31 December 2020)	Area (km^{2})
Scuol	4,624	144.14

Sur Tasna (Obtasna) sub-district
Municipality	Population (31 December 2020)	Area (km^{2})
Lavin	226	46.18
Susch	211	93.95
Zernez	1,506	203.91

Val Müstair
Municipality	Population (31 December 2020)	Area (km^{2})
Val Müstair	1,423	198.65

== Mergers and name changes ==
- In 2009 Fuldera, Lü, Müstair, Santa Maria Val Müstair, Tschierv and Valchava merged to form the municipality of Val Müstair.
- On 1 January 2013 the municipalities of Romosch and Tschlin merged to form the new municipality of Valsot.
- On 1 January 2015 the former municipalities of Ardez, Guarda, Tarasp, Ftan and Sent merged into the municipality of Scuol.

== Languages ==
Along with Surselva, the district of Inn is predominantly Romansh-speaking, with a large German-speaking minority. Except for the municipality of Samnaun, all of the municipalities of the district has both Romansh and German as their language, although the latter has an unofficial status in most of the municipalities.

Languages of Inn District, GR
Languages	Census 2000	
Languages	Number	Percent
German	3,177	35.7%
Romansh	5,144	57.9%
Italian	194	2.2%
TOTAL	8,888	100%
