= Tschierv =

- Former municipality
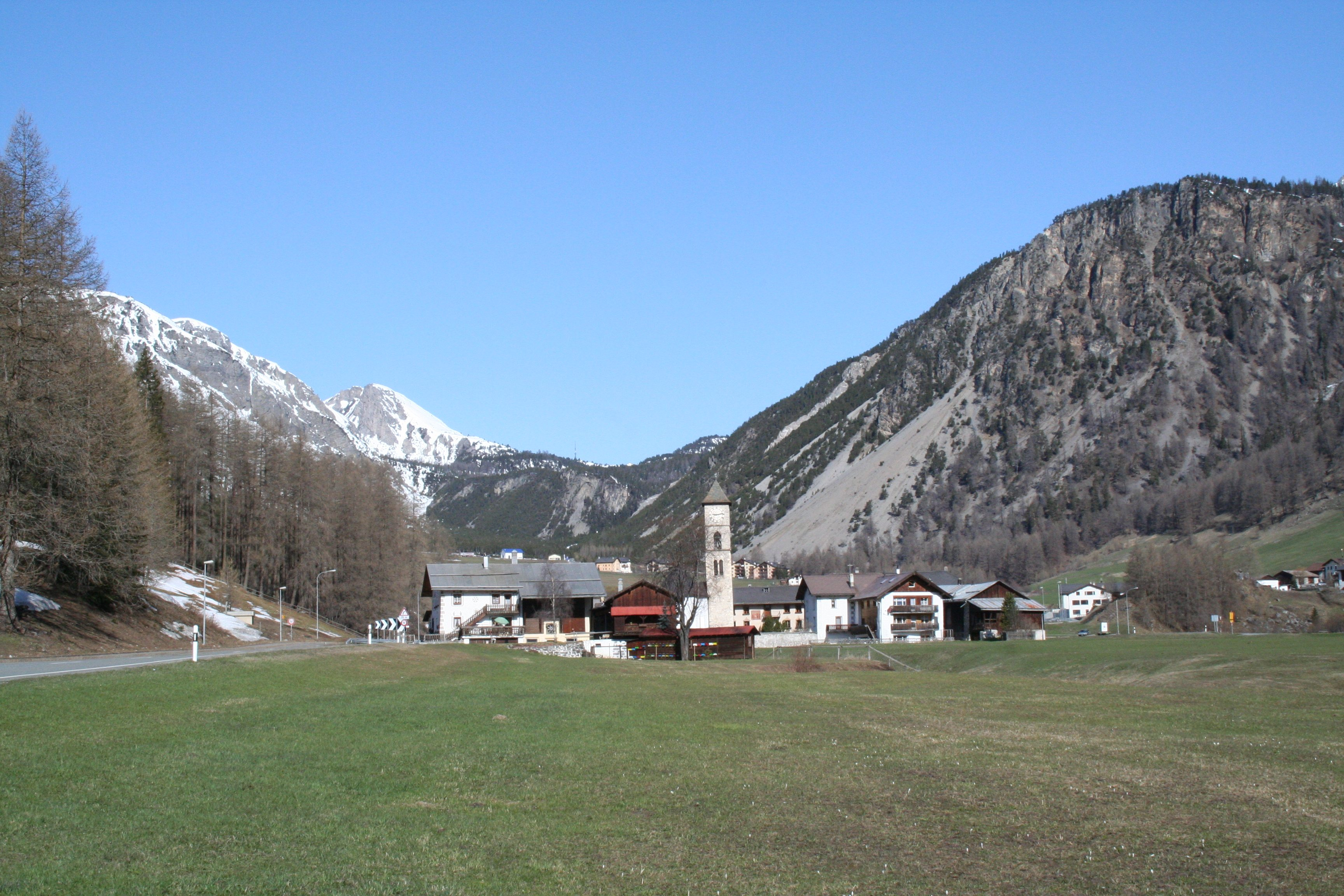
- Tschierv village

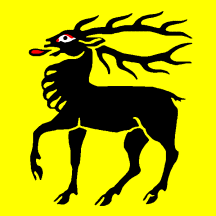
- Flag Coat of arms
- Location of Tschierv
- Location within Switzerland Location within Canton of Graubünden
- Coordinates: 46°37′N 10°20′E
- Country: Switzerland
- Canton: Graubünden
- District: Inn

Area
  - Total: 42.56 km^{2} (16.43 sq mi)
- Elevation: 1,660 m (5,450 ft)

Population (December 2008)
  - Total: 167
  - Density: 3.92/km^{2} (10.2/sq mi)
- Time zone: UTC+01:00 (CET)
  - Summer (DST): UTC+02:00 (CEST)
- Postal code: 7532
- SFOS number: 3845
- ISO 3166 code: CH-GR
- Surrounded by: Fuldera, Lü, Müstair, Scuol, Tarasp, Valchava, Valdidentro (IT-SO), Zernez
- Website: www.val-müstair.ch

Tschierv is a village in the Val Müstair municipality in the district of Inn in the Swiss canton of Graubünden. In 2009 Tschierv merged with Fuldera, Lü, Müstair, Santa Maria Val Müstair and Valchava to form the municipality of Val Müstair.

== History ==
Tschierv is first mentioned in 1432 as Zirff. In the past it was known under the German name of Cierfs.

== Geography ==
Aerial view (1954)

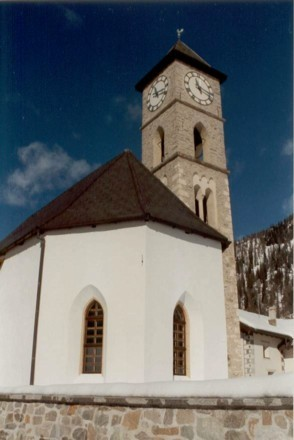
Reformed church in Tschierv

Tschierv has an area, as of 2006, of 42.6 km^{2} (16.4 sq mi). Of this area, 25.9% is used for agricultural purposes, while 26.9% is forested. Of the rest of the land, 1% is settled (buildings or roads) and the remainder (46.3%) is non-productive (rivers, glaciers or mountains).

The municipality is located in the Val Müstair sub-district (now Val Müstair municipality) of the Inn District. The borders of the village once stretched west over the Ofen Pass to Buffalora, Italy and included part of the Val Nüglia, which since 1918 has been part of the Swiss National Park. It consists of the house groups of Aintasom-Tschierv, Chasuras, Plaz and Orasom-Tschierv. Until 1943 Tschierv was known as Cierfs.

== Demographics ==
Tschierv has a population (as of 2008) of 167, of which 4.8% are foreign nationals. Over the last 10 years the population has decreased at a rate of -7.5%.

As of 2000, the gender distribution of the population was 50.0% male and 50.0% female. The age distribution, as of 2000, in Tschierv is; 18 children or 11.7% of the population are between 0 and 9 years old. 14 teenagers or 9.1% are 10 to 14, and 8 teenagers or 5.2% are 15 to 19. Of the adult population, 14 people or 9.1% of the population are between 20 and 29 years old. 17 people or 11.0% are 30 to 39, 27 people or 17.5% are 40 to 49, and 23 people or 14.9% are 50 to 59. The senior population distribution is 11 people or 7.1% of the population are between 60 and 69 years old, 13 people or 8.4% are 70 to 79, there are 9 people or 5.8% who are 80 to 89.

In the 2007 federal election the most popular party was the SVP which received 78.2% of the vote. The next three most popular parties were the SPS (14.8%), the FDP (6.2%) and the CVP (0.9%).

The entire Swiss population is generally well educated. In Tschierv about 61.3% of the population (between age 25-64) have completed either non-mandatory upper secondary education or additional higher education (either University or a Fachhochschule).

Tschierv has an unemployment rate of 1%. As of 2005, there were 9 people employed in the primary economic sector and about 4 businesses involved in this sector. 6 people are employed in the secondary sector and there are 4 businesses in this sector. 54 people are employed in the tertiary sector, with 16 businesses in this sector.

The historical population is given in the following table:

year	population
1835	155
1850	145
1900	146
1930	126
1941	160
1950	165
1960	139
1970	127
1980	134
1990	147
2000	154

== Languages ==
Most of the population (as of 2000) speaks Rhaeto-Romance (77.3%), with German being second most common (18.8%) and Portuguese being third ( 1.3%). Until 1980, nearly the entire population of the village spoke the Jauer dialect of Romansh. Since that time, the percentage of German speakers has been growing. In 1880 about 81.8% spoke Romansh as a first language, in 1910 it was 93%, in 1941 it was 92% and in 1970 88% spoke Romansh. In 1990 92% spoke Romansh as either a first or second language and in 2000 it was 92%.

Languages in Tschierv
Languages	Census 1980		Census 1990		Census 2000	
Languages	Number	Percent	Number	Percent	Number	Percent
German	6	4.48%	18	12.24%	29	18.83%
Romanish	128	95.52%	125	85.03%	119	77.27%
Population	134	100%	147	100%	154	100%
