= Lü, Switzerland =

Lü
- Former municipality
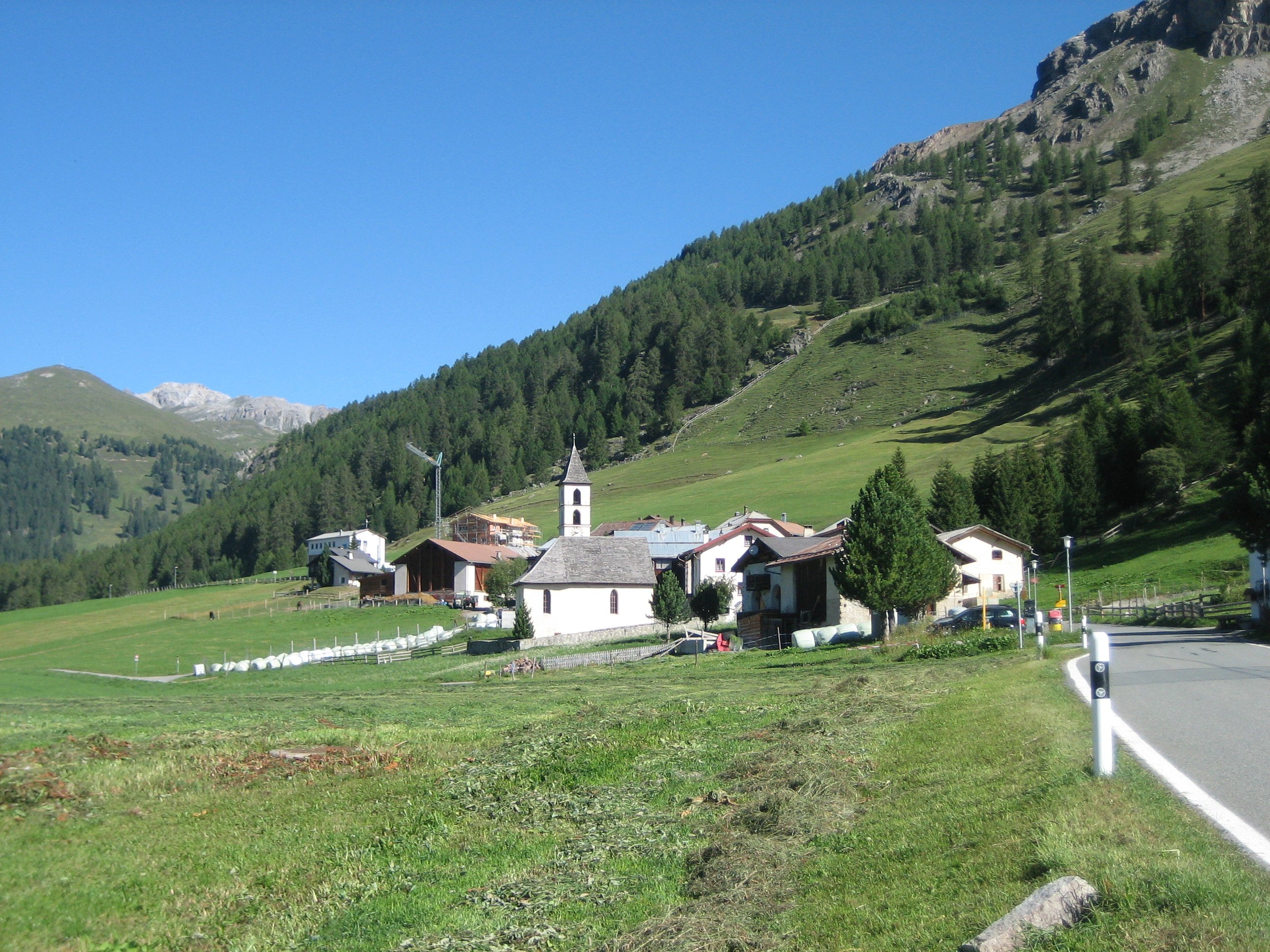
- Lü village

- Flag Coat of arms
- Location of Lü
- Location within Switzerland Location within Canton of Graubünden
- Coordinates: 46°37′N 10°22′E
- Country: Switzerland
- Canton: Graubünden
- District: Inn

Area
  - Total: 6.84 km^{2} (2.64 sq mi)
- Elevation: 1,920 m (6,300 ft)

Population (December 2008)
  - Total: 63
  - Density: 9.2/km^{2} (24/sq mi)
- Time zone: UTC+01:00 (CET)
  - Summer (DST): UTC+02:00 (CEST)
- Postal code: 7534
- SFOS number: 3842
- ISO 3166 code: CH-GR
- Surrounded by: Fuldera, Santa Maria Val Müstair, Tschierv, Taufers im Münstertal (IT-BZ), Valchava
- Website: SFSO statistics

Lü is a village in the Val Müstair municipality in the district of Inn in the Swiss canton of Graubünden. In 2009, Lü merged with Fuldera, Müstair, Santa Maria Val Müstair, Tschierv and Valchava to form the municipality of Val Müstair.

== History ==
Lü is first mentioned in 1466 as Lug.

== Geography ==
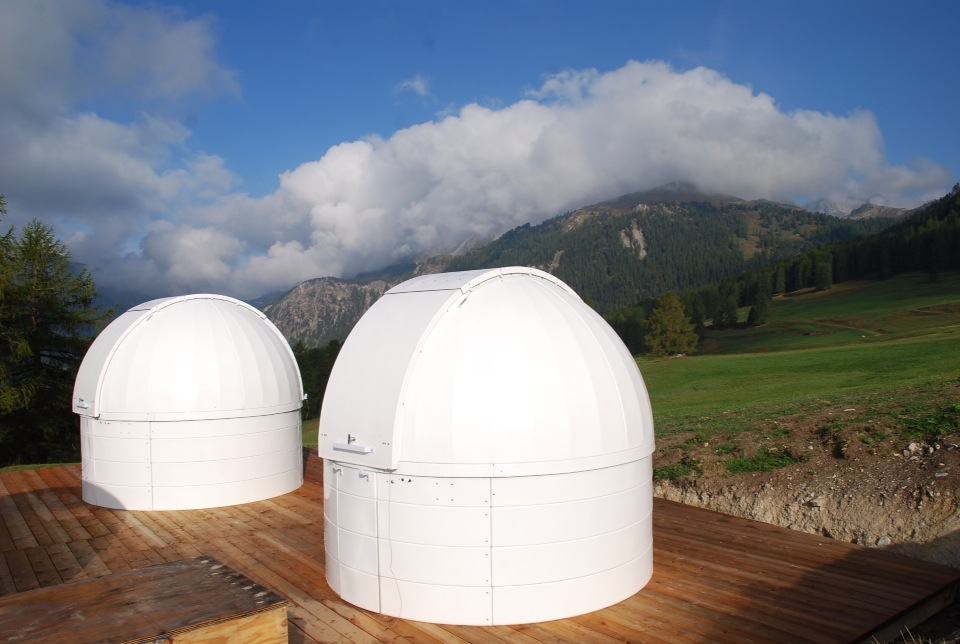
Astrophotography Center Alpine Astrovillage Lü-Stailas, excellent conditions in central Europe, open to the public

Lü had an area, as of 2006, of 6.8 km^{2} (2.6 sq mi). Of this area, 45.5% is used for agricultural purposes, while 34.5% is forested. Of the rest of the land, 1.5% is settled (buildings or roads) and the remainder (18.6%) is non-productive (rivers, glaciers or mountains).

The municipality is located in the Val Müstair sub-district (now Val Müstair municipality) of the Inn district. It is one of the highest villages in Europe, at an elevation of 1,920 m (6,300 ft) on a terrace above the left bank of the Rombach. It consists of the village of Lü and the hamlet of Lüsai.

== Demographics ==
Lü has a population (as of 2008) of 63, of which 4.8% are foreign nationals. Over the last 10 years the population has decreased at a rate of -19.8%.

As of 2000, the gender distribution of the population was 47.7% male and 52.3% female. The age distribution, as of 2000, in Lü is; 9 children or 14.5% of the population are between 0 and 9 years old. 6 teenagers or 9.7% are 10 to 14, and 1 teenager is 15 to 19. Of the adult population, no one is between 20 and 29 years old. 12 people or 19.4% are 30 to 39, 13 people or 21.0% are 40 to 49, and 5 people or 8.1% are 50 to 59. The senior population distribution is 10 people or 16.1% of the population are between 60 and 69 years old, 2 people or 3.2% are 70 to 79, there are 4 people or 6.5% who are 80 to 89.

In the 2007 federal election the most popular party was the SVP which received 98% of the vote. The rest of the votes went to the FDP (1%) and the SPS (0%).

The entire Swiss population is generally well educated. In Lü about 71.9% of the population (between age 25-64) have completed either non-mandatory upper secondary education or additional higher education (either University or a Fachhochschule).

Lü has an unemployment rate of 0%. As of 2005, there were 16 people employed in the primary economic sector and about 8 businesses involved in this sector. 3 people are employed in the secondary sector and there are 2 businesses in this sector. 12 people are employed in the tertiary sector, with 2 businesses in this sector.

The historical population is given in the following table:

year	population
1835	74
1850	95
1900	59
1950	56
1980	56
2000	62

== Languages ==
Most of the population (as of 2000) speaks Rhaeto-Romance (82.3%), with the rest speaking German (17.7%) In the valley, the Romansh speaking population speaks the Jauer dialect. In 1910 about 90% of the population spoke Romansh, in 1941 it was 96% and in 1970 it was 94%. In 1990 98% understood Romansh even if wasn't their first language and in 2000 it was 87%.

Languages in Lü
Languages	Census 1980		Census 1990		Census 2000	
Languages	Number	Percent	Number	Percent	Number	Percent
German	4	7.14%	5	9.09%	11	17.74%
Romansh	51	91.07%	50	90.91%	51	82.26%
Population	56	100%	55	100%	62	100%

== Tourism ==
There is a small car parking in the village. A number of hiking trails start here, up the hills or down to the valley in summer and winter. In fall 2009 - the International Year of Astronomy - a public observatory Alpine Astrovillage Lü-Stailas was inaugurated. The Center is equipped with robotic telescopes for direct observations as well as for astrophotography. The equipment is also used in introductory courses for beginning amateur astronomers. The Astrovillage is located on a terrace at an elevation of 2,000 m (6,400 ft) and has favorable geographical and meteorological conditions for astronomy.
