= Valdidentro =

- Comune
- Comune di Valdidentro
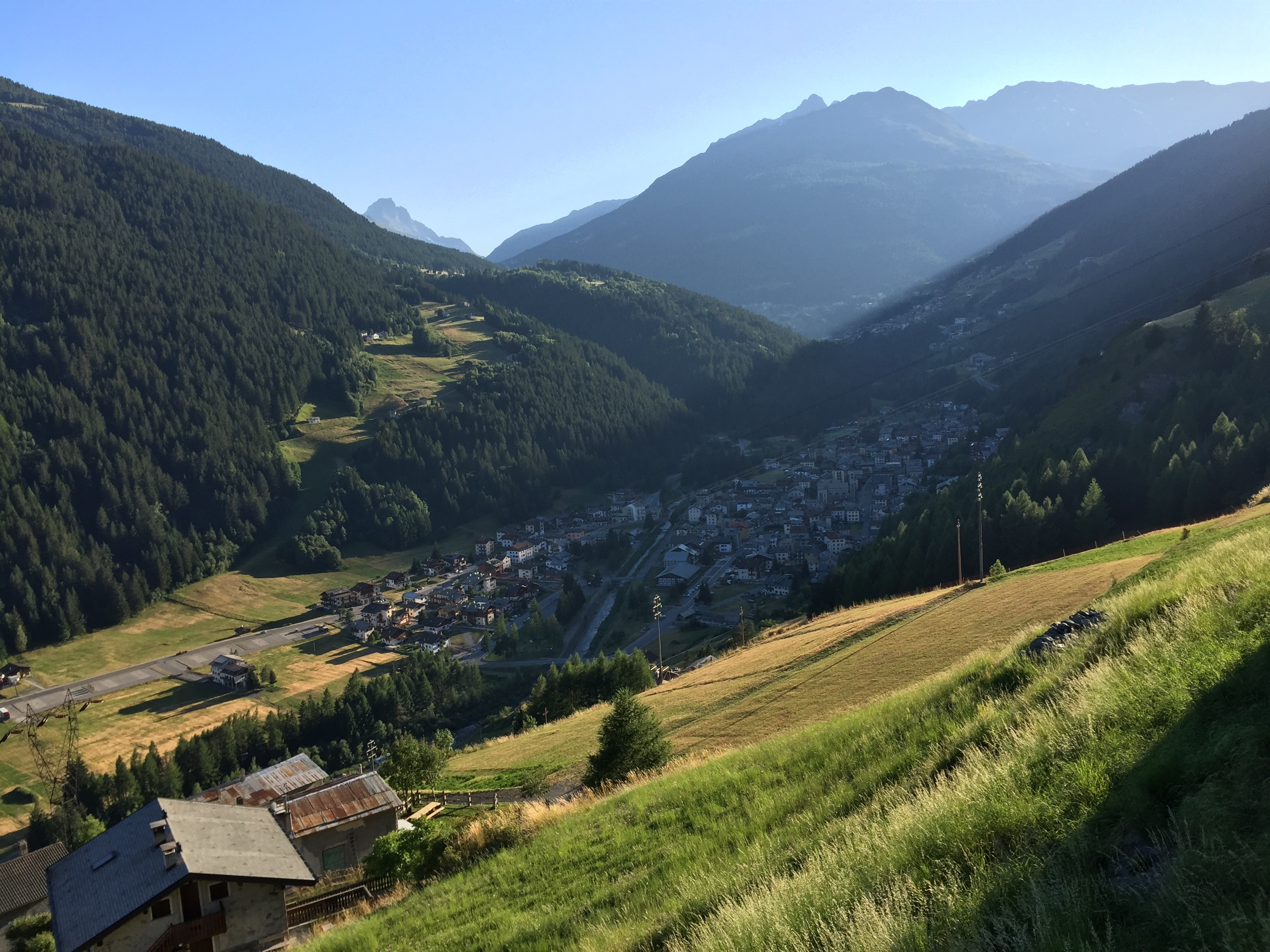
- View over Valdidentro

- Coat of arms

- Location within Italy Location within Lombardy
- Coordinates: 46°29′N 10°18′E
- Country: Italy
- Region: Lombardy
- Province: Sondrio (SO)
- Frazioni: Premadio, Pedenosso, Isolaccia, Semogo

Government
  - Mayor: Massimiliano Trabucchi

Area
  - Total: 244.2 km^{2} (94.3 sq mi)
- Elevation: 1,345 m (4,413 ft)

Population (31 July 2017)
  - Total: 4,118
  - Density: 16.86/km^{2} (43.68/sq mi)
- Time zone: UTC+1 (CET)
  - Summer (DST): UTC+2 (CEST)
- Postal code: 23038
- Dialing code: 0342

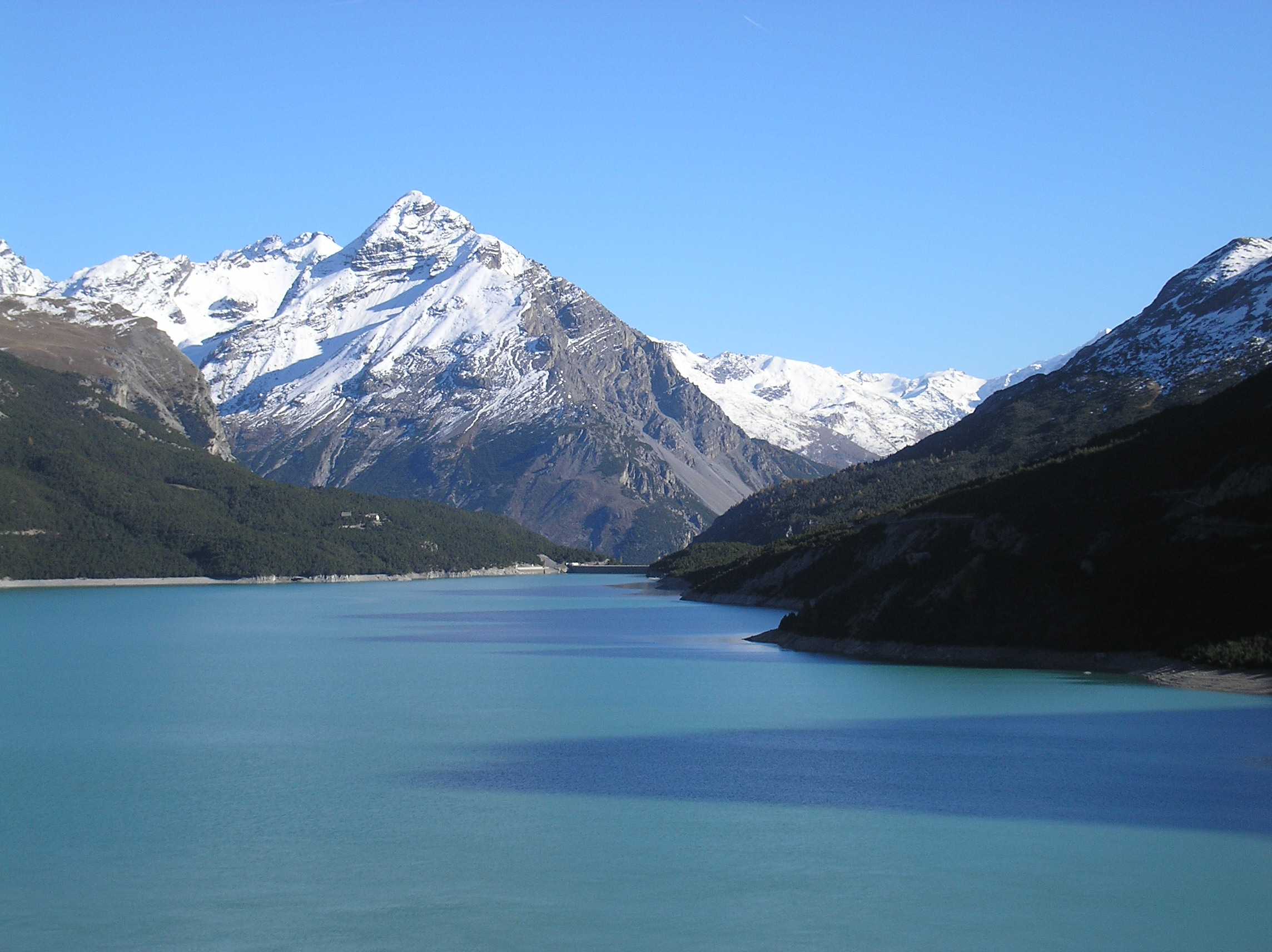
Cancano Lake in Autumn

Valdidentro is a comune (municipality) in the Province of Sondrio in the Italian region Lombardy, located about 140 kilometres (87 mi) northeast of Milan and about 50 kilometres (31 mi) northeast of Sondrio, in the upper Alta Valtellina on the border with Switzerland.

It is the seat of hot baths, located on Monte Reit in the frazione of Premadio.

Valdidentro borders the following municipalities: Bormio, Grosio, Livigno, Müstair (Switzerland), Poschiavo (Switzerland), Santa Maria Val Müstair (Switzerland), Tschierv (Switzerland), Valdisotto, Zernez (Switzerland).

== See also ==
- Lago Viola
- Stelvio Pass
