= Rom (river) =

River in Switzerland and Italy

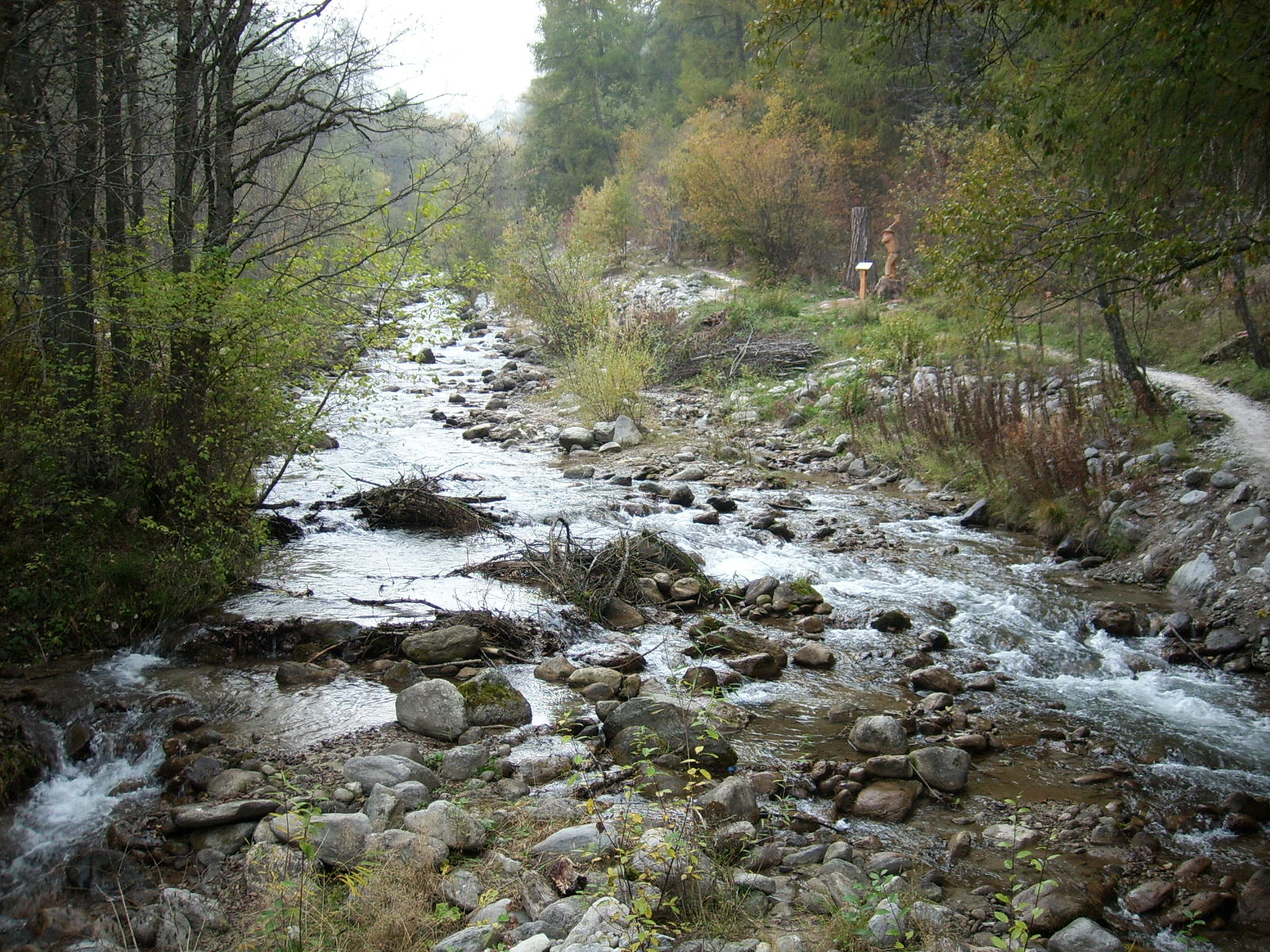
- Rom near Valchava, Val Müstair

Location
- Country: Switzerland, Italy

Physical characteristics
- Mouth: Adige
  - coordinates: 46.6705°N 10.5445°E
- Length: 24.7 km (15.3 mi)
- Basin size: 189 km^{2} (73 sq mi)

Basin features
- Progression: Adige→ Adriatic Sea

The Rom (Romansh: Rom; Italian: Ram; German: Rombach in Switzerland or Rambach in South Tyrol (Italy) is a river in Switzerland and Italy. The 24.7-kilometre (15.3 mi) long river is a tributary of the Adige. It rises in the Ortler Alps, close to the Fuorn Pass. It flows through the Val Müstair in Switzerland, and joins the Adige near the town Glurns in the Italian province of South Tyrol. The drainage basin is 189 square kilometres (73 mi^{2}).

== See also ==
- List of rivers of Italy
- List of rivers of Switzerland
