= Müstair =

- Former municipality
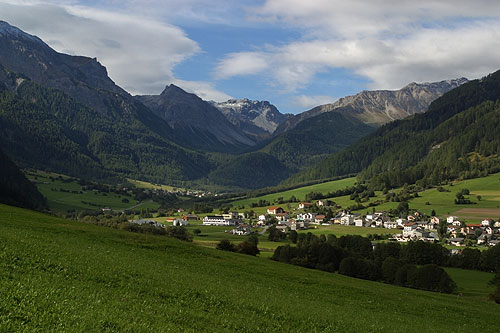

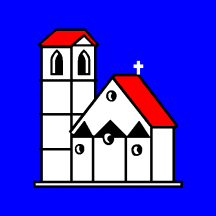
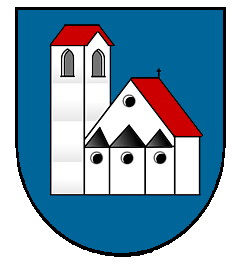
- Flag Coat of arms
- Location of Müstair
- Location within Switzerland Location within Canton of Graubünden
- Coordinates: 46°37′N 10°27′E
- Country: Switzerland
- Canton: Graubünden
- District: Inn

Area
  - Total: 77.71 km^{2} (30.00 sq mi)
- Elevation: 1,273 m (4,177 ft)

Population (December 2008)
  - Total: 748
  - Density: 9.63/km^{2} (24.9/sq mi)
- Time zone: UTC+01:00 (CET)
  - Summer (DST): UTC+02:00 (CEST)
- Postal code: 7537
- SFOS number: 3843
- ISO 3166 code: CH-GR
- Surrounded by: Fuldera, Prad am Stilfser Joch (IT-BZ), Santa Maria Val Müstair, Stilfs (IT-BZ), Tschierv, Taufers im Münstertal (IT-BZ), Valchava, Valdidentro (IT-SO)
- Website: SFSO statistics

Müstair [myʃtɐir] is a village in the Val Müstair municipality in the district of Inn in the Swiss canton of Graubünden. In 2009 Müstair merged with Fuldera, Lü, Switzerland, Santa Maria Val Müstair, Tschierv and Valchava to form Val Müstair.

The easternmost point of Switzerland, at Piz Chavalatsch, is located in the municipality.

The main tourist attraction in the area is the Benedictine Convent of Saint John.

== History ==
Müstair is first mentioned in the early 9th Century as monasterium Tuberis.

== Geography ==
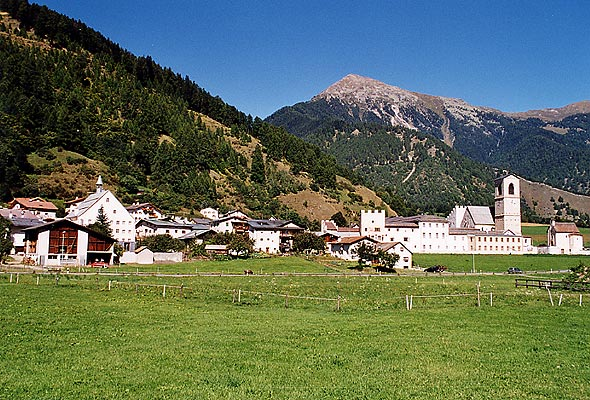
Müstair

Aerial view (1954)

Müstair has an area, as of 2006, of 77.7 km^{2} (30.0 sq mi). Of this area, 24.1% is used for agricultural purposes, while 21.1% is forested. Of the rest of the land, 0.6% is settled (buildings or roads) and the remainder (54.1%) is non-productive (rivers, glaciers or mountains). The village is located in the Val Müstair sub-district (now Val Müstair municipality) of the Inn district. It is a long linear village and is the lowest and largest village in the Val Müstair. It is also the most eastern village in Switzerland. Until 1943 Müstair was known as Münster (GR).

== Demographics ==
Müstair has a population (as of 2008) of 748, of which 5.9% are foreign nationals. Over the last 10 years the population has decreased at a rate of −9.4%.

As of 2000, the gender distribution of the population was 49.6% male and 50.4% female. The age distribution, as of 2000, in Müstair is; 76 children or 10.2% of the population are between 0 and 9 years old. 71 teenagers or 9.5% are 10 to 14, and 40 teenagers or 5.4% are 15 to 19. Of the adult population, 66 people or 8.9% of the population are between 20 and 29 years old. 107 people or 14.4% are 30 to 39, 109 people or 14.6% are 40 to 49, and 100 people or 13.4% are 50 to 59. The senior population distribution is 68 people or 9.1% of the population are between 60 and 69 years old, 76 people or 10.2% are 70 to 79, there are 28 people or 3.8% who are 80 to 89, and there are 4 people or 0.5% who are 90 to 99.

In the 2007 federal election the most popular party was the CVP which received 57.5% of the vote. The next three most popular parties were the SVP (21.7%), the SPS (12.7%) and the FDP (7%).

The entire Swiss population is generally well educated. In Müstair about 69.1% of the population (between age 25-64) have completed either non-mandatory upper secondary education or additional higher education (either University or a Fachhochschule).

Müstair has an unemployment rate of 0.95%. As of 2005, there were 45 people employed in the primary economic sector and about 25 businesses involved in this sector. 121 people are employed in the secondary sector and there are 14 businesses in this sector. 270 people are employed in the tertiary sector, with 50 businesses in this sector.

The historical population is given in the following table:

Year	Population
1835	513
1850	475
1900	599
1950	776
2000	745

== Languages ==
Most of the population (as of 2000) speaks Rhaeto-Romance (72.9%), with German being second most common (24.7%) and Portuguese being third (0.7%). Most of the population speaks the Jauer dialect of Romansh. In 1880 about 87% spoke Romansh as a first language, in 1910 88% spoke Romansh and in 1941 it was 89%. In 1990 about 88% understood Romansh as a first or second language, and in 2000 it was 86%.

Languages in Müstair
Languages	Census 1980		Census 1990		Census 2000	
Languages	Number	Percent	Number	Percent	Number	Percent
Romansh	574	81.19%	578	76.86%	543	72.89%
German	123	17.40%	160	21.28%	184	24.70%
Italian	8	1.13%	10	1.33%	4	0.54%
Population	707	100%	752	100%	745	100%

== Heritage sites of national significance ==
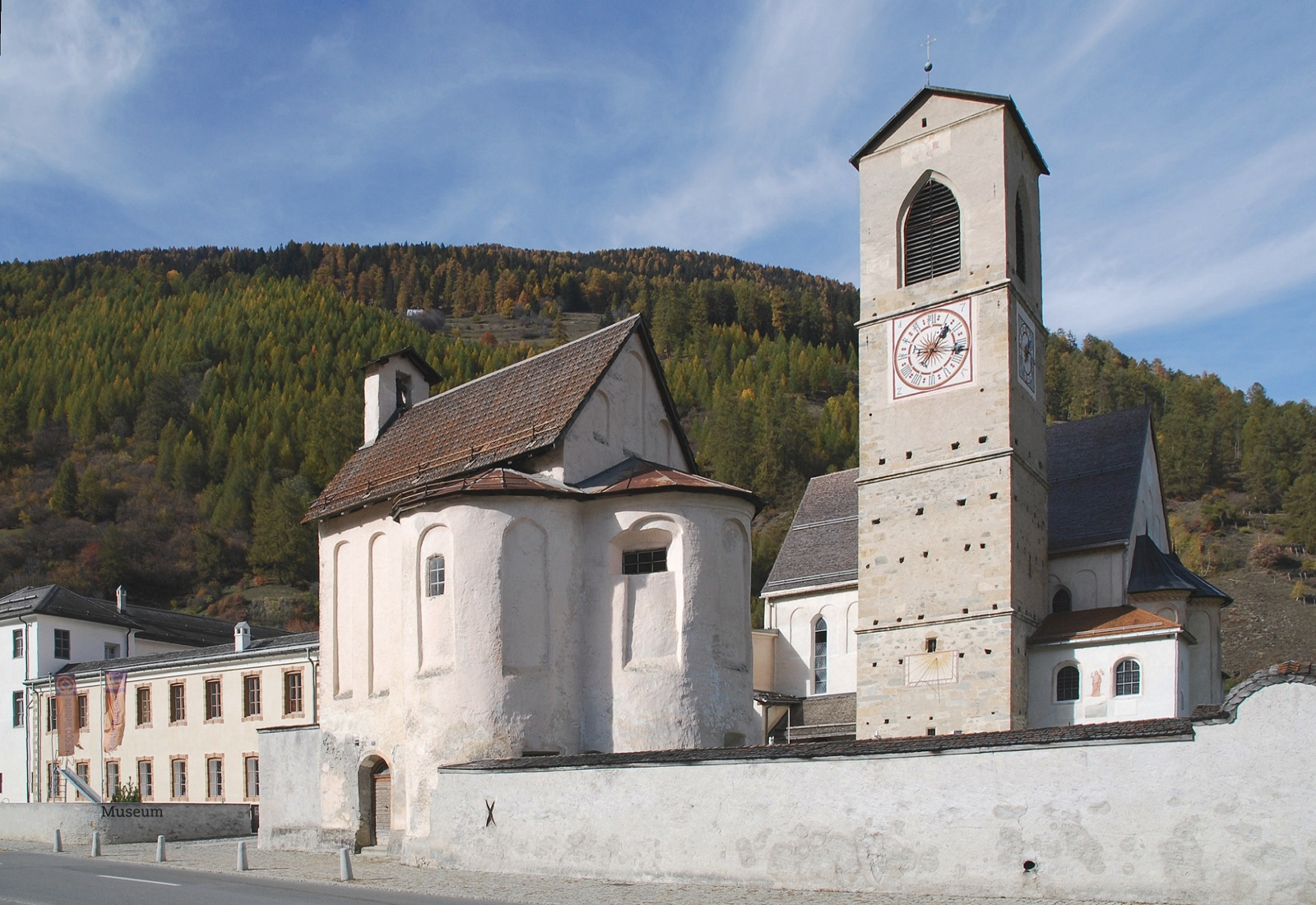
Benedictine Convent of Saint John

The Benedictine Convent of Saint John is both listed as a Swiss heritage site of national significance and a UNESCO World Heritage Site.

== Weather ==
Müstair has an average of 86.7 days of rain per year and on average receives 690 mm (27 in) of precipitation. The wettest month is August during which time Müstair receives an average of 86 mm (3.4 in) of precipitation. During this month there is precipitation for an average of 9.3 days. The month with the most days of precipitation is May, with an average of 10, but with only 80 mm (3.1 in) of precipitation. The driest month of the year is February with an average of 33 mm (1.3 in) of precipitation over 9.3 days.
