= Santa Maria Val Müstair =

- Former municipality
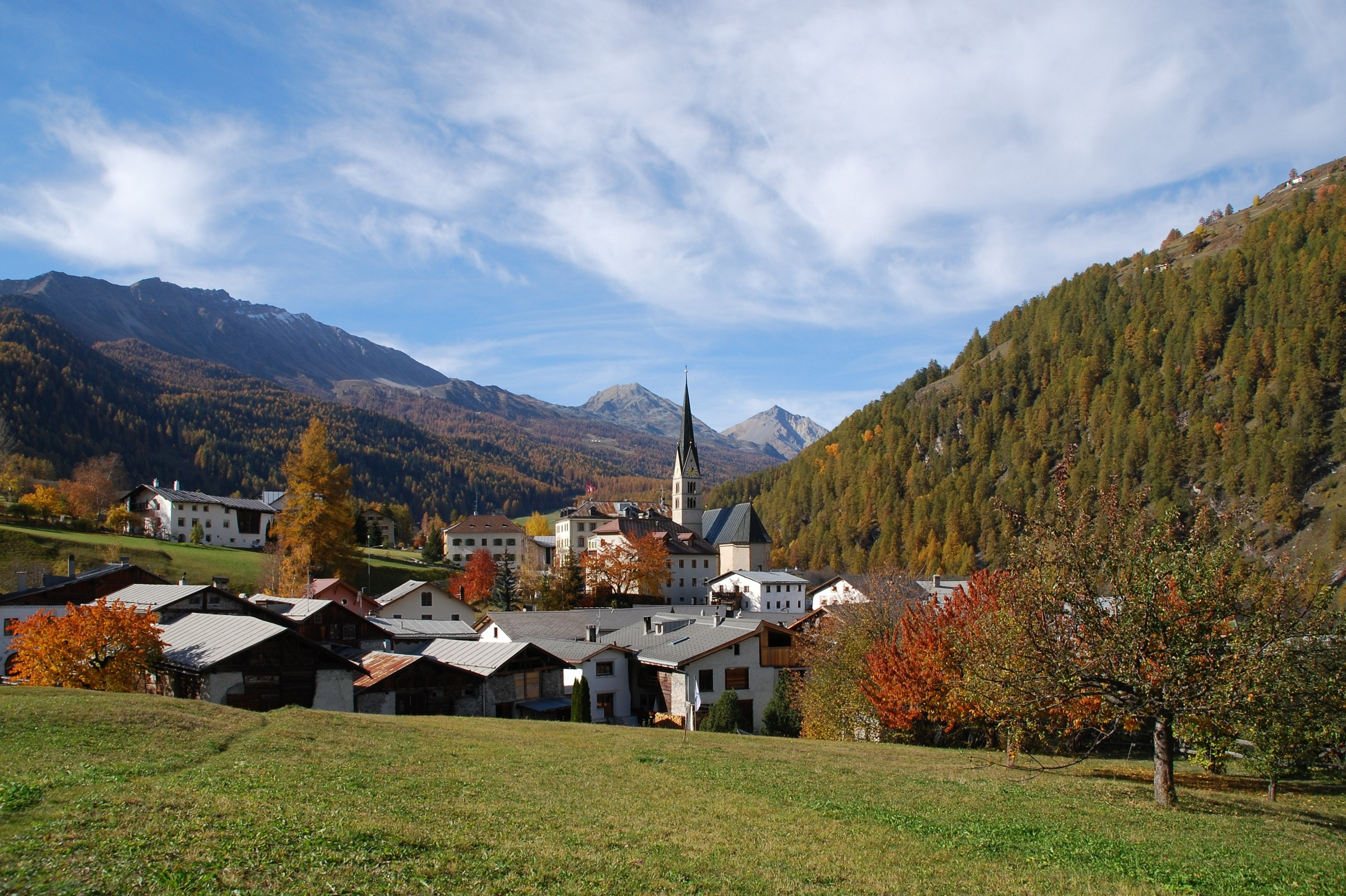

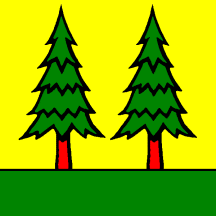
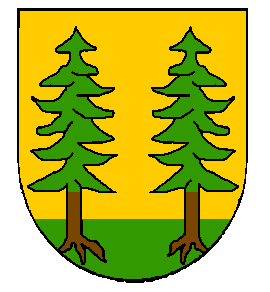
- Flag Coat of arms
- Location of Santa Maria Val Müstair
- Location within Switzerland Location within Canton of Graubünden
- Coordinates: 46°36′N 10°25′E
- Country: Switzerland
- Canton: Graubünden
- District: Inn

Area
  - Total: 41.54 km^{2} (16.04 sq mi)
- Elevation: 1,375 m (4,511 ft)

Population (December 2008)
  - Total: 339
  - Density: 8.16/km^{2} (21.1/sq mi)
- Time zone: UTC+01:00 (CET)
  - Summer (DST): UTC+02:00 (CEST)
- Postal code: 7536
- SFOS number: 3844
- ISO 3166 code: CH-GR
- Surrounded by: Bormio (IT-SO), Lü, Müstair, Stilfs (IT-BZ), Taufers im Münstertal (IT-BZ), Valchava, Valdidentro (IT-SO)
- Website: www.stamaria.ch

Santa Maria Val Müstair (Romansh: Soncha Maria) is a village in the Val Müstair municipality in the district of Inn in the Swiss canton of Graubünden. In 2009 Santa Maria Val Müstair merged with Lü, Müstair, Fuldera, Tschierv and Valchava to form the municipality of Val Müstair.

== History ==
Sta. Maria Val Müstair is first mentioned in 1167–70 as die Kapelle Sancte Mariae in Silvaplana.

== Geography ==
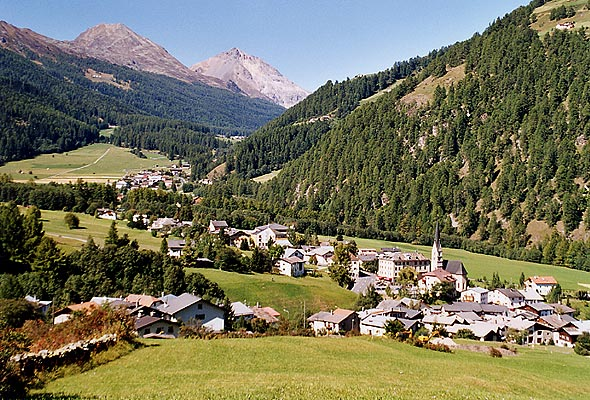
Santa Maria Val Müstair

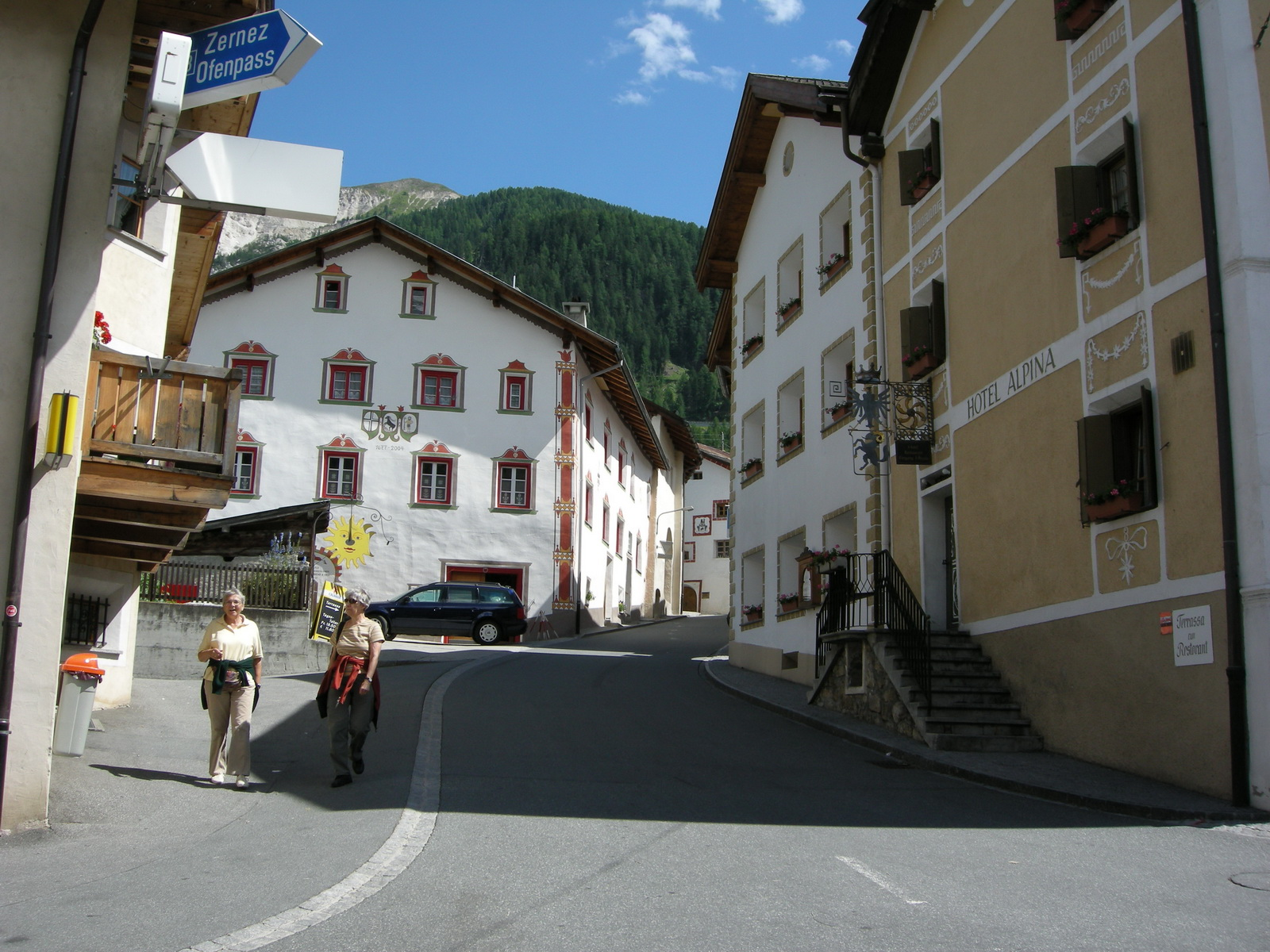
One of the main streets in Santa Maria Val Müstair

Aerial view (1954)

Sta. Maria Val Müstair has an area, as of 2006, of 41.6 km^{2} (16.1 sq mi). Of this area, 31.9% is used for agricultural purposes, while 24.7% is forested. Of the rest of the land, 1.2% is settled (buildings or roads) and the remainder (42.1%) is non-productive (rivers, glaciers or mountains).

The village is located in the Val Müstair sub-district (now Val Müstair municipality) of the Inn district. It is along the Umbrail pass road. It consists of the cross-shaped village of Sta. Maria Val Müstair and the alpine settlements of Craistas, Büglios and Pütschai as well as the hamlet of Sielva which includes the hospital. Until 1995 Sta. Maria Val Müstair was known as Santa Maria im Münstertal.

== Population ==
Sta. Maria Val Müstair has a population (as of 2008) of 339, of which 8.8% are foreign nationals. Over the last 10 years the population has decreased at a rate of −14.8%.

As of 2000, the gender distribution of the population was 54.2% male and 45.8% female. The age distribution, as of 2000, in Sta. Maria Val Müstair is; 7 children or 4.5% of the population are between 0 and 9 years old. 6 teenagers or 3.9% are 10 to 14, and 10 teenagers or 6.5% are 15 to 19. Of the adult population, 13 people or 8.4% of the population are between 20 and 29 years old. 15 people or 9.7% are 30 to 39, 25 people or 16.2% are 40 to 49, and 26 people or 16.9% are 50 to 59. The senior population distribution is 27 people or 17.5% of the population are between 60 and 69 years old, 19 people or 12.3% are 70 to 79, there are 4 people or 2.6% who are 80 to 89, and there are 2 people or 1.3% who are 90 to 99.

In the 2007 federal election the most popular party was the SVP which received 43.7% of the vote. The next three most popular parties were the SPS (23.3%), the FDP (19.6%) and the CVP (11.8%).

The entire Swiss population is generally well educated. In Sta. Maria Val Müstair about 63.7% of the population (between age 25–64) have completed either non-mandatory upper secondary education or additional higher education (either University or a Fachhochschule).

Sta. Maria Val Müstair has an unemployment rate of 1.45%. As of 2005, there were 32 people employed in the primary economic sector and about 10 businesses involved in this sector. 49 people are employed in the secondary sector and there are 10 businesses in this sector. 192 people are employed in the tertiary sector, with 32 businesses in this sector.

The historical population is given in the following table:

Historical population
Year	Pop.	±%
1850	437	—
1900	385	−11.9%
1950	420	+9.1%
2000	327	−22.1%

== Languages ==
Most of the population (as of 2000) speaks Rhaeto-Romance (69.7%), with German being second most common (25.4%) and Portuguese being third ( 2.4%). Most of the population speaks the Jauer dialect of Romansh, though even in the 19th century there was a German-speaking minority. In 1880 about 81% of the population spoke Romansh as their first language, in 1910 it was 63%, in 1941 it was 74% and in 1970 it had grown to 81%.

Languages in Santa Maria
Languages	Census 1980		Census 1990		Census 2000	
Languages	Number	Percent	Number	Percent	Number	Percent
German	78	20.31%	106	28.73%	83	25.38%
Romansh	295	76.82%	259	70.19%	228	69.72%
Italian	5	1.30%	3	0.81%	2	0.61%
Population	384	100%	369	100%	327	100%

== Climate ==
Sta. Maria in Val Müstair features a warm summer humid continental climate (Dfb) according to the Köppen climate classification. The town receives on average 95.6 days of rain per year totalling 767 mm (30.2 in) of precipitation. This relatively low level of precipitation is primarily due to its central location inside the Alps. The wettest month is August during which time Sta. Maria receives on average 109 mm (4.3 in) of precipitation. During this month there is precipitation for an average of 11.0 days. The driest month of the year is February with an average of 25 mm (0.98 in) of precipitation over 5.1 days. The wettest month is therefore nearly 5 times wetter than the driest one, making Sta. Maria one of the places with the largest seasonal precipitation variety in all of Switzerland, only behind Samedan in the neighbouring Engadin valley.

Climate data for Sta. Maria, Val Müstair, elevation 1,386 m (4,547 ft), (1991–2020)
Month	Jan	Feb	Mar	Apr	May	Jun	Jul	Aug	Sep	Oct	Nov	Dec	Year
Mean daily maximum °C (°F)	0.5 (32.9)	2.4 (36.3)	6.6 (43.9)	10.7 (51.3)	15.2 (59.4)	19.5 (67.1)	21.2 (70.2)	20.5 (68.9)	15.9 (60.6)	11.0 (51.8)	5.0 (41.0)	1.1 (34.0)	10.8 (51.4)
Daily mean °C (°F)	−2.6 (27.3)	−1.6 (29.1)	1.9 (35.4)	5.8 (42.4)	10.1 (50.2)	13.9 (57.0)	15.6 (60.1)	15.1 (59.2)	10.9 (51.6)	6.6 (43.9)	1.7 (35.1)	−1.9 (28.6)	6.3 (43.3)
Mean daily minimum °C (°F)	−5.6 (21.9)	−5.4 (22.3)	−2.1 (28.2)	1.3 (34.3)	5.4 (41.7)	8.8 (47.8)	10.6 (51.1)	10.4 (50.7)	6.9 (44.4)	3.3 (37.9)	−1.1 (30.0)	−4.6 (23.7)	2.3 (36.1)
Average precipitation mm (inches)	27.0 (1.06)	25.3 (1.00)	32.9 (1.30)	47.1 (1.85)	59.7 (2.35)	92.2 (3.63)	98.6 (3.88)	109.1 (4.30)	79.2 (3.12)	88.6 (3.49)	70.4 (2.77)	36.6 (1.44)	766.7 (30.19)
Average snowfall cm (inches)	40.3 (15.9)	37.2 (14.6)	28.2 (11.1)	14.6 (5.7)	1.7 (0.7)	0.1 (0.0)	0.0 (0.0)	0.0 (0.0)	0.1 (0.0)	7.5 (3.0)	28.9 (11.4)	42.2 (16.6)	200.8 (79.1)
Average precipitation days (≥ 1.0 mm)	4.8	5.1	5.5	7.0	9.2	10.8	11.6	11.0	8.1	8.5	7.9	6.1	95.6
Average snowy days (≥ 1.0 cm)	7.0	7.0	4.8	2.8	0.3	0.0	0.0	0.0	0.0	1.2	4.8	7.1	35.0
Average relative humidity (%)	66	62	62	63	65	65	65	71	73	75	73	68	67
Source 1: NOAA
Source 2: MeteoSwiss

== Personalities ==
- Dario Cologna, cross-country skier
