= Taufers im Münstertal =

- Comune
- Municipality of Taufers im Münstertal; Gemeinde Taufers im Münstertal (German); Comune di Tubre (Italian)
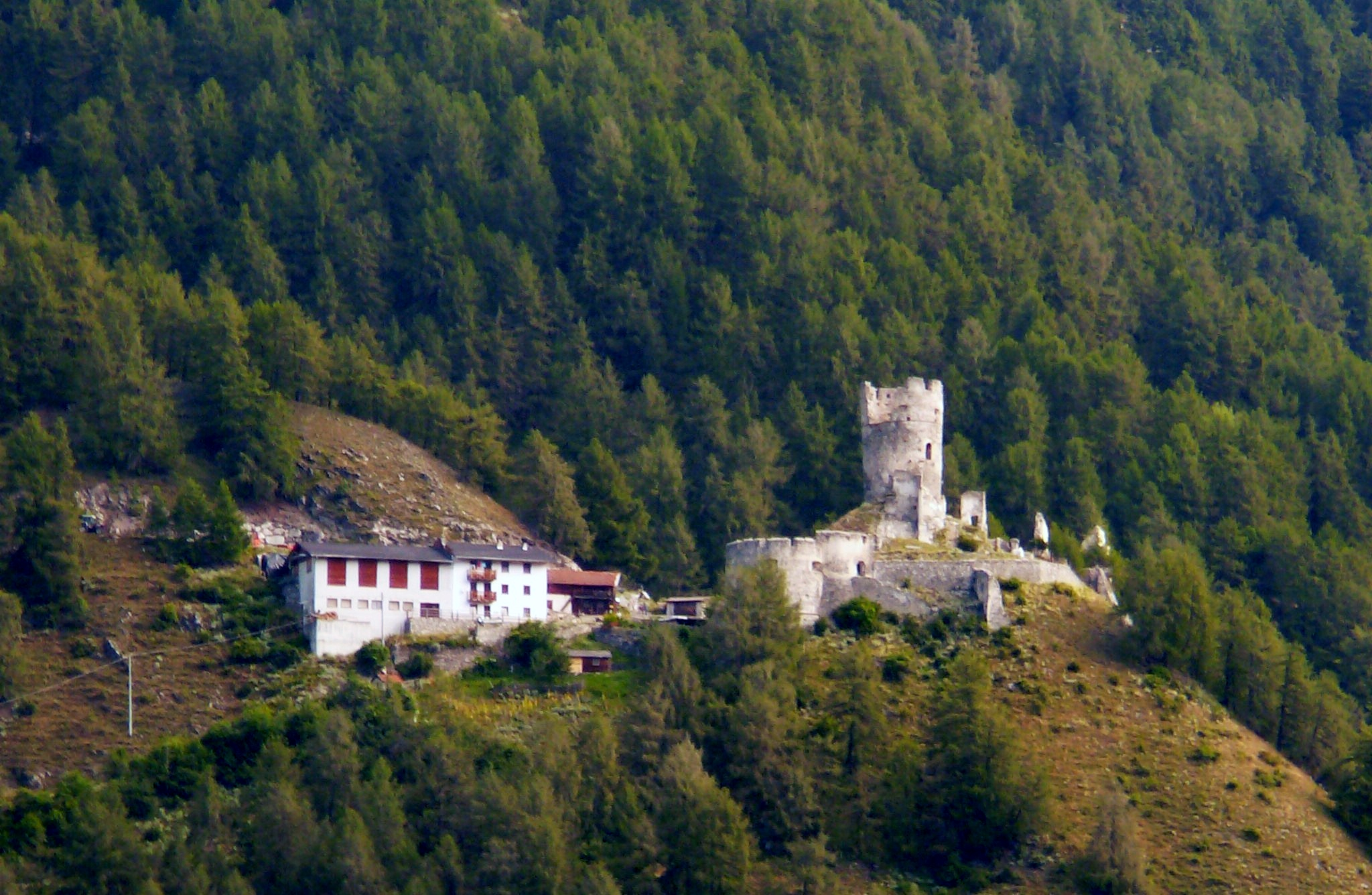
- Reichenberg Castle, in Taufers

- Coat of arms

- Location within Italy Location within Trentino-Alto Adige/Südtirol
- Coordinates: 46°39′N 10°28′E
- Country: Italy
- Region: Trentino-Alto Adige/Südtirol
- Province: South Tyrol (BZ)
- Frazioni: Pundweil (Pontevilla), Rifair (Rivaira)

Government
  - Mayor: Roselinde Gunsch Koch

Area
  - Total: 45.8 km^{2} (17.7 sq mi)
- Elevation: 1,240 m (4,070 ft)

Population (Nov. 2010)
  - Total: 964
  - Density: 21.0/km^{2} (54.5/sq mi)
- Demonym(s): German: Tauferser; Italian: tubresi
- Time zone: UTC+1 (CET)
  - Summer (DST): UTC+2 (CEST)
- Postal code: 39020
- Dialing code: 0473
- Website: Official website

Taufers im Münstertal (German: [ˈtaʊfɐs ʔɪm ˈmʏnstɐtaːl]; Italian: Tubre [ˈtuːbre]; Romansh: Tuer) is a comune (municipality) in South Tyrol in northern Italy, located about 70 kilometres (43 mi) west of the city of Bolzano, on the border with Switzerland.

== Geography ==
As of November 30, 2010, it had a population of 964 and an area of 45.8 square kilometres (17.7 mi^{2}).

Taufers borders the following municipalities: Glurns, Mals, Prad am Stilfser Joch, Stilfs, Lü (Switzerland), Müstair (Switzerland), Santa Maria Val Müstair (Switzerland), Scuol (Switzerland), and Valchava (Switzerland).

=== Frazioni ===
The municipality of Taufers contains the frazioni (subdivisions, mainly villages and hamlets) Pundweil (Pontevilla) and Rifair (Rivaira).

== History ==
=== Coat-of-arms ===
The shield is party per bend, the first part of gules and the second fusilly of argent and azure. It is the insignia of Lords of Reichenberg who lived in the local castle since 1373. The emblem was granted in 1967.

== Society ==
=== Linguistic distribution ===
According to the 2024 census, 97.68% of the population speak German and 2.32% Italian as first language.

=== Demographic evolution ===
Historical population

| Year | Pop. | ±% |
|---|---|---|
| 1860 | ? | — |
| 1870 | ? | — |
| 1880 | 821 | — |
| 1900 | ? | — |
| 1910 | 857 | — |

| Year | Pop. | ±% |
|---|---|---|
| 1921 | 1,002 | +16.9% |
| 1931 | 1,034 | +3.2% |
| 1936 | 1,102 | +6.6% |
| 1951 | 993 | −9.9% |
| 1961 | 1,004 | +1.1% |

| Year | Pop. | ±% |
|---|---|---|
| 1971 | 991 | −1.3% |
| 1981 | 955 | −3.6% |
| 1991 | 952 | −0.3% |
| 2001 | 949 | −0.3% |
| 2011 | 964 | +1.6% |

Source: Data from ISTAT
