= Val Müstair =

- Municipality
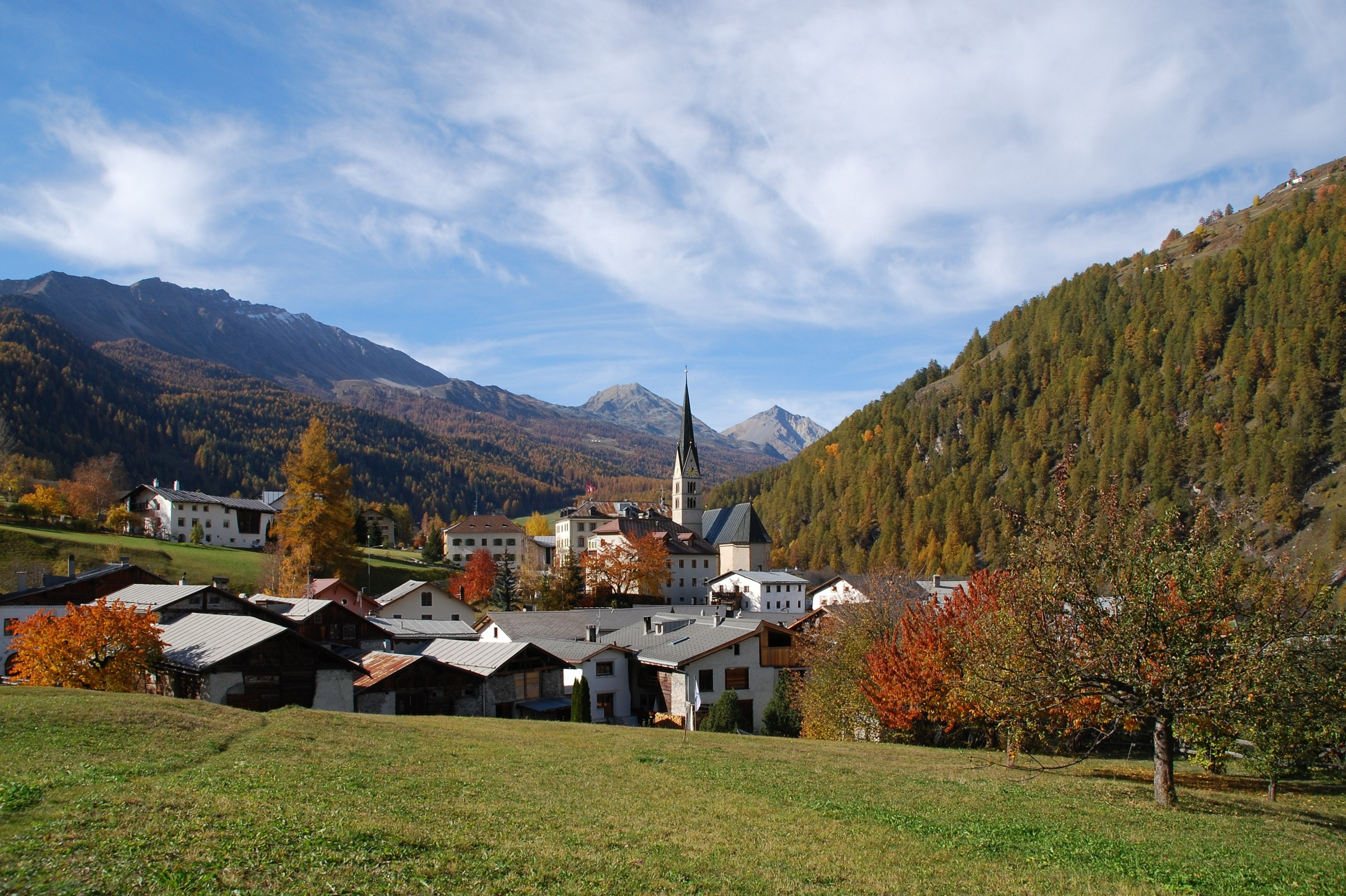

- Flag Coat of arms
- Location of Val Müstair
- Location within Switzerland Location within Canton of Grisons
- Coordinates: 46°36′N 10°25′E
- Country: Switzerland
- Canton: Grisons
- District: Engiadina Bassa/Val Müstair

Area
  - Total: 198.65 km^{2} (76.70 sq mi)

Population (December 2020)
  - Total: 1,423
  - Density: 7.163/km^{2} (18.55/sq mi)
- Time zone: UTC+01:00 (CET)
  - Summer (DST): UTC+02:00 (CEST)
- Postal code: 7537
- SFOS number: 3847
- ISO 3166 code: CH-GR
- Surrounded by: Tschierv, Fuldera, Lü, Valchava, Santa Maria Val Müstair and Müstair.
- Website: http://www.cdvm.ch/

Val Müstair (German: Münstertal, pronounced [ˈmʏnstərˌtaːl]) is a municipality in the Engiadina Bassa/Val Müstair Region in the Swiss canton of the Grisons. It was formed on 1 January 2009 through the merger of Tschierv, Fuldera, Lü, Valchava, Santa Maria Val Müstair and Müstair.

== Demographics ==
Val Müstair had a population (as of 31 December 2020) of 1,423.

== Geography ==
Aerial view (1954)

The Val Müstair (German: Münstertal, Italian: Val Monastero) is a mountain valley in the Swiss Alps. It connects the Fuorn Pass, (2,149 m (7,051 ft)) with the Italian province of South Tyrol and the Vinschgau (914 m (2,999 ft)).

The Benedictine Convent of Saint John at Müstair (monastery), a World Heritage Site, was probably founded by Charlemagne, sharing history with its neighbor, the Marienberg Abbey.

The most important villages in the Val Müstair are: Tschierv (1,660 m (5,450 ft)), Valchava (1,412 m (4,633 ft)), Sta. Maria (1,375 m (4,511 ft)), Müstair (1,247 m (4,091 ft)) (all Swiss) and Taufers im Münstertal in South Tyrol. There are no other inhabited connected valleys, but the road over the Umbrail Pass (and the Stelvio Pass) is connected with Sta. Maria.

The largest part of the valley is part of the Swiss canton of the Grisons. A small part lies in the Italian province of South Tyrol. The border is located at approximately 1245 meter between Müstair (1247 meter) and Taufers im Münstertal (1240 meter).

The river in the valley is the Rom (Il Rom or Rombach).

== Naming convention ==
Contrary to the common notion, where the beginning of a valley is referred as the "upper valley" and the end as the "lower valley", in Val Müstair these are referred to as "inner" and "outer" respectively. This is often reflected in location names.

For instance, the valley is traditionally divided into three thirds:

- Terzal d'Aint (inner third) with Tschierv, Fuldera and Lü
- Terzal d'Immez (middle third) with Valchava and Sta. Maria
- Terzal d'Oura (outer third) with Müstair

Incidentally, this division corresponds to the first three plateaus occurring on the Swiss part of the valley.

== Language ==
The majority of the population in the new municipality speaks Romansh, with a large German speaking minority. The following table lists the historical language distribution of the formerly independent municipalities and also for the combined municipality:

Languages in Val Müstair
Languages	Villages	Census 1980		Census 1990		Census 2000	
Languages	Villages	Number	Percent	Number	Percent	Number	Percent
German
German	Fuldera	5	5.00%	17	16.19%	27	23.48%
German	Lü	4	7.14%	5	9.09%	11	17.74%
German	Müstair	123	17.40%	160	21.28%	184	24.70%
German	Sta. Maria	78	20.31%	106	28.73%	83	25.38%
German	Tschierv	6	4.48%	18	12.24%	29	18.83%
German	Valchava	44	20.18%	31	15.20%	37	18.32%
German	Total	260	16.26%	337	20.65%	371	23.12%
Romansh							
Romansh	Fuldera	95	95.00%	87	82.86%	86	74.78%
Romansh	Lü	51	91.07%	50	90.91%	51	82.26%
Romansh	Müstair	574	81.19%	578	76.86%	543	72.89%
Romansh	Sta. Maria	295	76.82%	259	70.19%	228	69.72%
Romansh	Tschierv	128	95.52%	125	85.03%	119	80.27%
Romansh	Valchava	168	77.06%	167	81.86%	163	80.69%
Romansh	Total	1,311	81.99%	1,266	77.57%	1,190	74.14%
Population		1,599	100%	1,632	100%	1,605	100%

== Heritage sites of national significance ==
The Benedictine Convent of Saint John is both listed as a Swiss heritage site of national significance and a UNESCO World Heritage Site.

== Weather ==
Müstair village has an average of 86.7 days of rain per year and on average receives 690 mm (27 in) of precipitation. The wettest month is August during which time Müstair receives an average of 86 mm (3.4 in) of precipitation. During this month there is precipitation for an average of 9.3 days. The month with the most days of precipitation is May, with an average of 10, but with only 80 mm (3.1 in) of precipitation. The driest month of the year is February with an average of 33 mm (1.3 in) of precipitation over 9.3 days.

The higher elevation village of Sta. Maria Val Müstair has an average of 94.6 days of rain per year and on average receives 801 mm (31.5 in) of precipitation. The wettest month is August during which time Sta. Maria Val Müstair receives an average of 105 mm (4.1 in) of precipitation. During this month there is precipitation for an average of 10.6 days. The driest month of the year is February with an average of 34 mm (1.3 in) of precipitation over 10.6 days.

== Tourism ==
There is a small amount of car parking in the village. It is the starting point for a number of hiking trails. Above Tschierv, at the mountain Minschuns, is a little ski resort. In 2009, during the International Year of Astronomy, a new public observatory Alpine Astrovillage Lü-Stailas was inaugurated. The center is equipped with robotic telescopes for direct observations, as well as for astrophotography. The equipment is also used to provide introductory courses for amateur astronomers. The Astrovillage is located on a terrace at an elevation of 2,000 m (6,400 ft).

== Sports ==
Val Müstair has hosted several stages of the Tour de Ski, a cross-country skiing stage event.

== Notable residents ==
Donna Leon, American crime novelist.

== See also ==
- Nature parks in Switzerland
