= Lai da Tarasp =

Lake in the Grisons, Switzerland

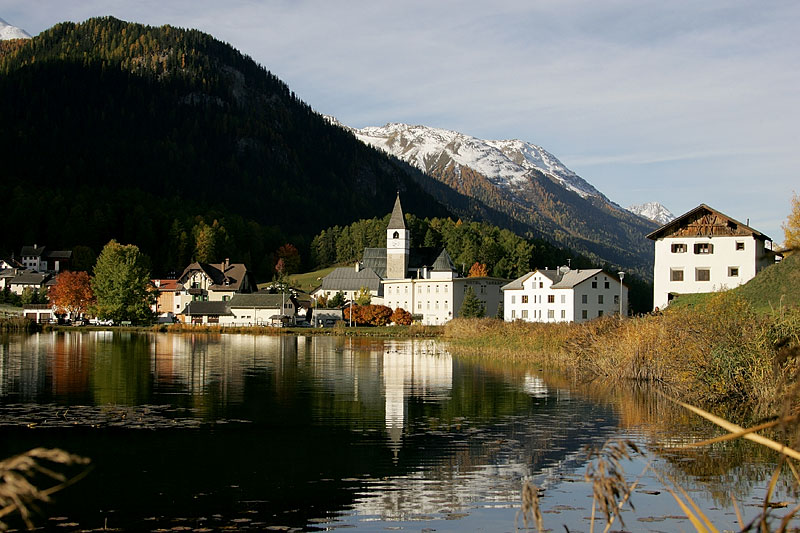

- Location within Canton of Graubünden Location within Switzerland Location within Alps
- Interactive map of Lai da Tarasp
- Location: Tarasp, Engadin, Grisons
- Coordinates: 46.7771°N 10.2627°E
- Basin countries: Switzerland
- Surface area: 2 ha (4.9 acres)
- Surface elevation: 1,404 m (4,606 ft)

Lai da Tarasp is a lake at Tarasp in the Grisons, Switzerland. Its surface area is 2 ha (4.9 acres).

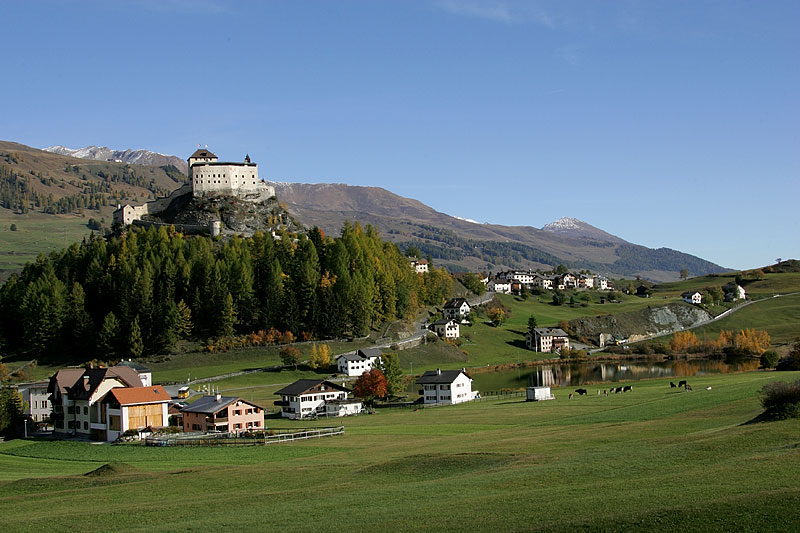
Castle of Tarasp above the village and its lake.
