= Pradella =

Coordinates: 46°48′N 10°19′E

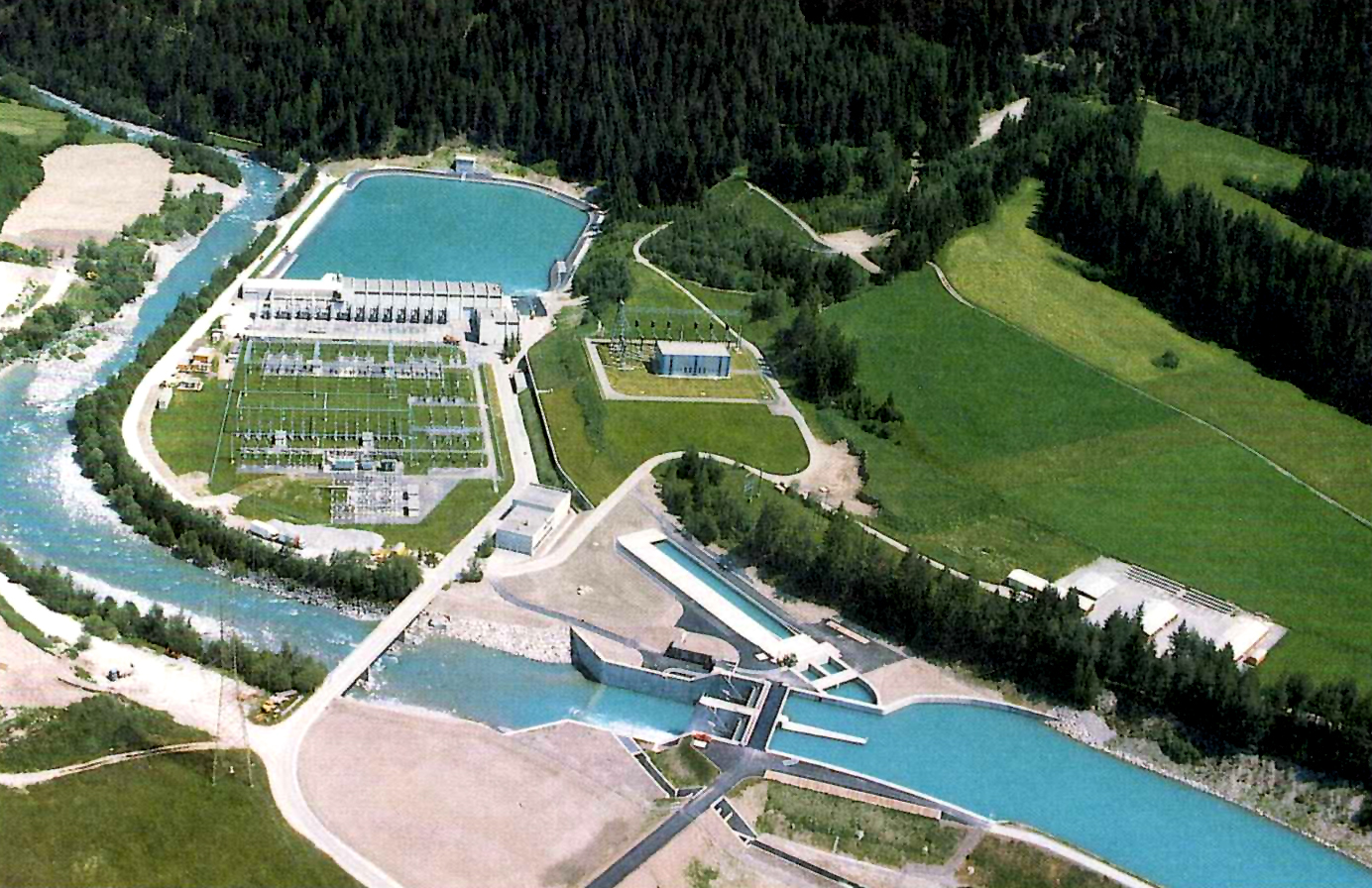
Kraftwerk Pradella on the Inn with the reservoir (bottom right)

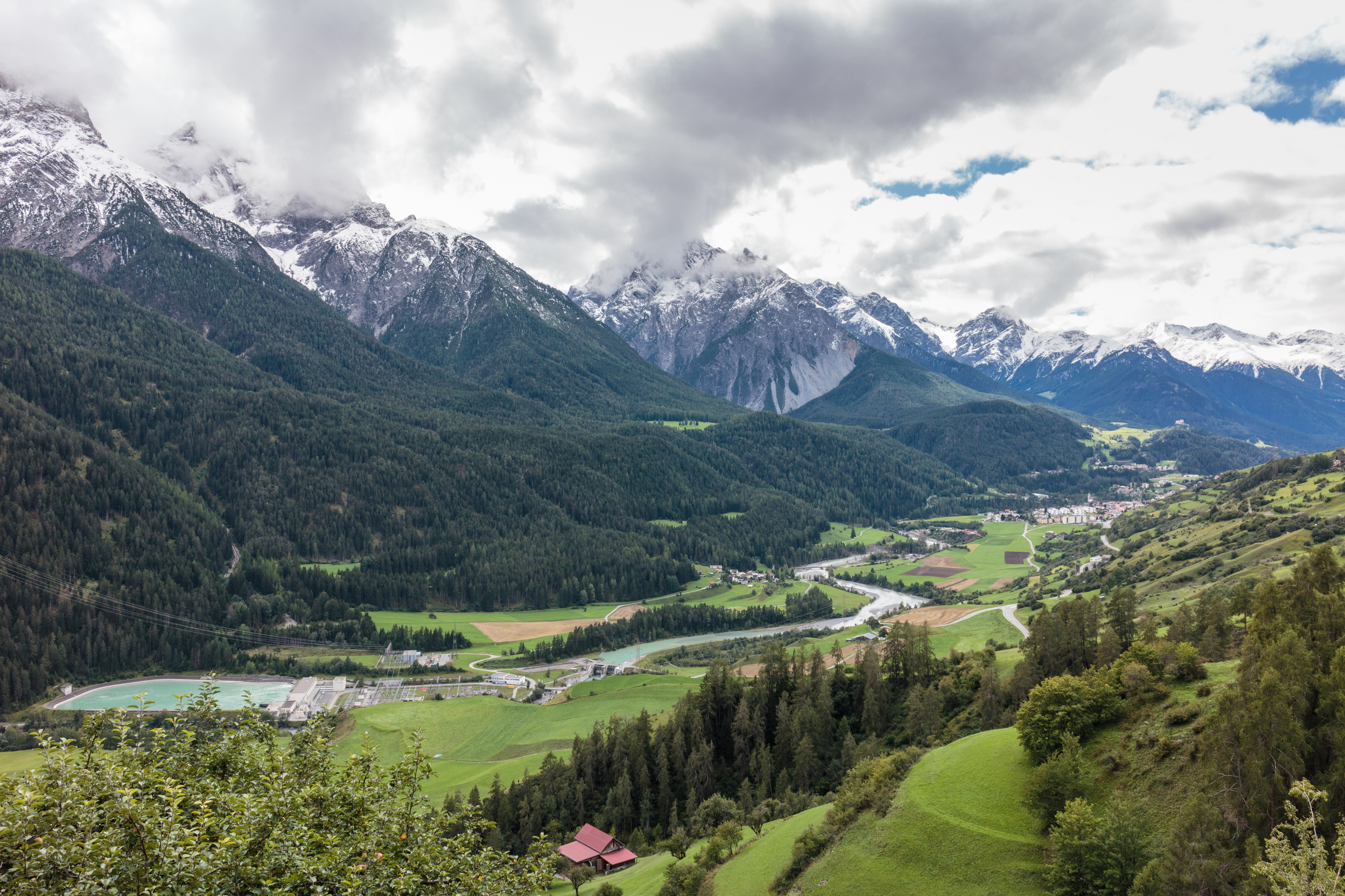
The village in the middle of the photo and Sesvenna Alps above. A view from Sent

Pradella is a village in the canton of Graubünden, located east of Scuol in the Engadin. It lies on the right bank of the Inn and has about 35 inhabitants. It belongs to the municipality of Scuol.

Near Pradella is a power station owned by the Engadiner Kraftwerke company. The Pradellasee, the reservoir formed by the dam on the Inn, has an area of 8.00 ha.
