= Hotel Waldhaus Vulpera =

Hotel in Switzerland, 1896–1989

Coordinates: 46°47′15.51239″N 10°17′20.81″E

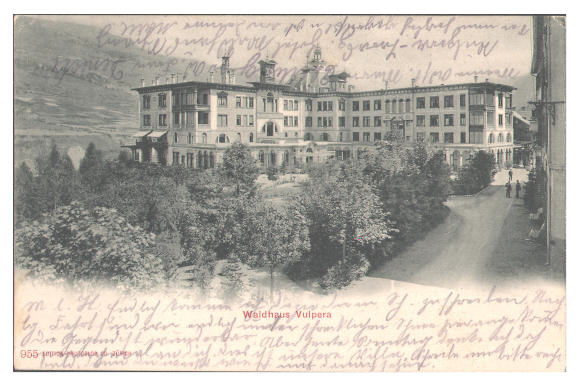
Waldhaus Vulpera 1907

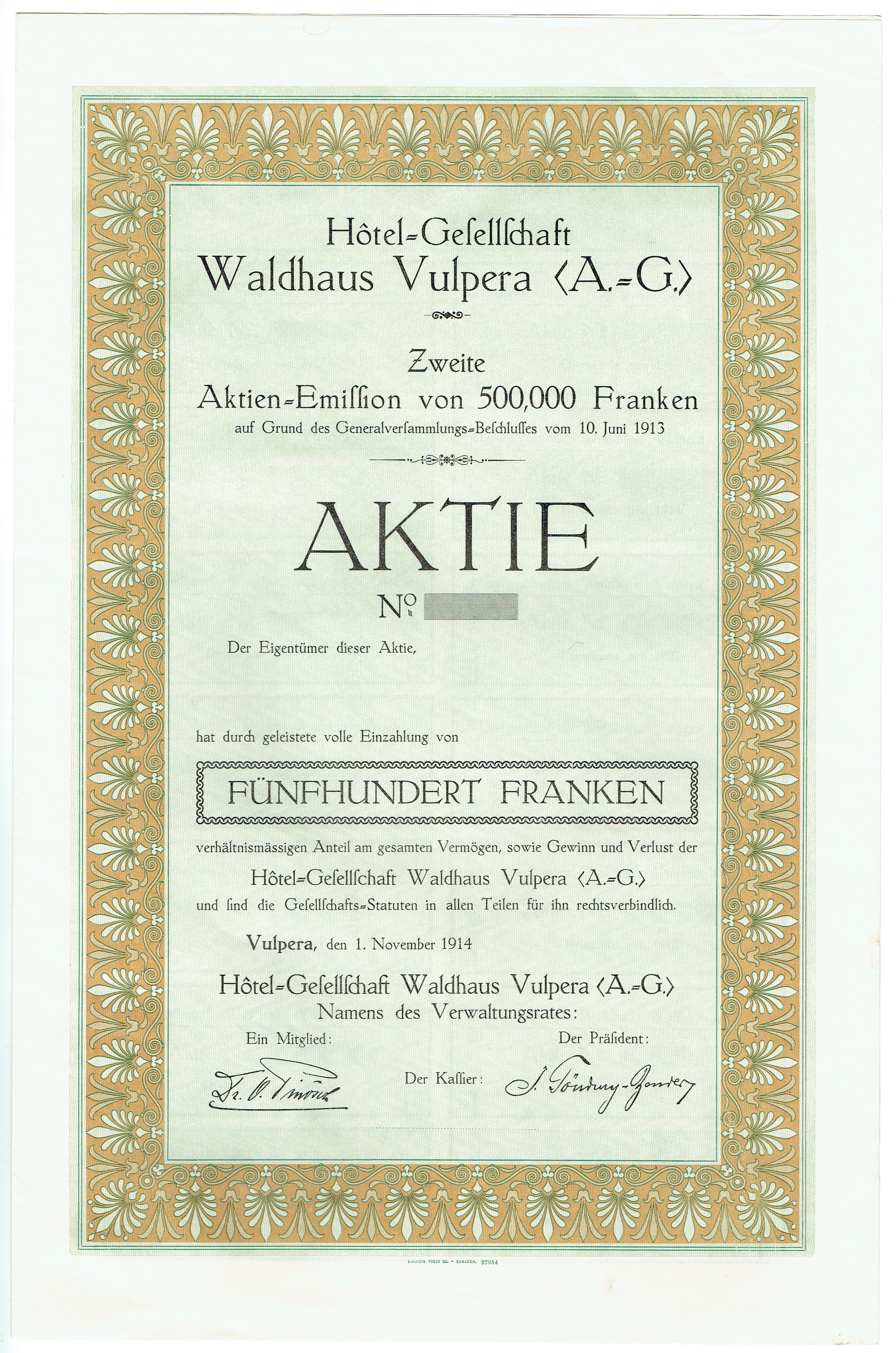
Share of the Hotel-Gesellschaft Waldhaus Vulpera AG, issued 1 November 1914

The Neo-Renaissance style Grand Hotel Hotel Waldhaus Vulpera with Sgraffito-Elements was one of the first addresses in the Swiss Alps and was a major Belle Époque monument in Europe. With its 270 beds it was the largest hotel in Scuol-Tarasp-Vulpera and was one of the most important new hotel buildings in the 19th century and is thus a piece of architectural history.

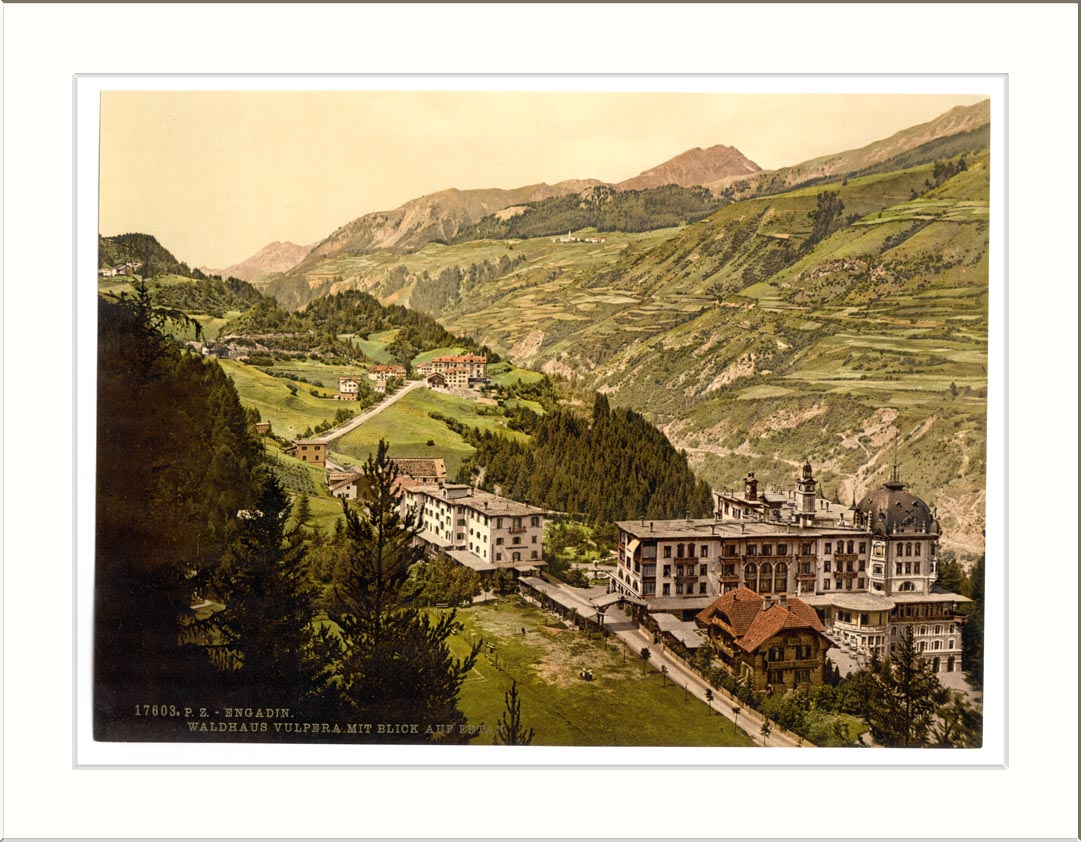
Grand Hotel Waldhaus Vulpera and Villa Wilhelmina in the year 1900

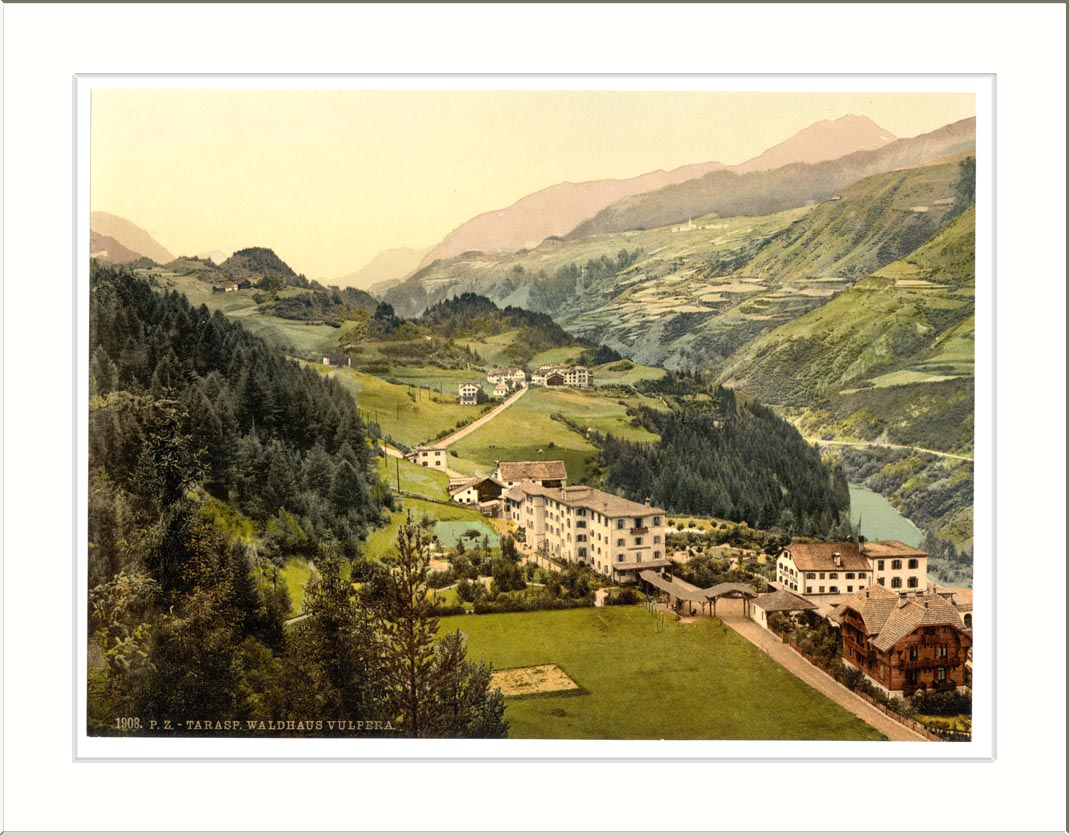
Waldhaus Vulpera and Villa Wilhelmina in the year 1895

== History ==
The Grand Hotel Waldhaus Vulpera was erected 1896–97 by the architect Nikolaus Hartmann senior (1838–1903), it was opened on June 8, 1897. Among the frequent visitors was also Friedrich Dürrenmatt, who was inspired by the Grand Hotel for his last novel “Durcheinandertal”. In 1988 the hotel was closed for renovation and guided tours were offered which also included the big kitchen, which was planned to be transformed in a swimming pool during the renovation works.

On 27 May 1989 the hotel was destroyed by conflagration which seemed to be a case of arson. The annual report of the Graubünden Insurance Company lists the following: Total loss Hotel Waldhaus arson, Amount of loss: 23 Million Swiss Francs. Today the site is transformed in a park, which incorporates architectural remains (such as cast iron columns) of the Grand Hotel

The Hotel Waldhaus Vulpera served as model hotel for Dürrenmatts last novel “Durcheinandertal”. After Dürrenmatt had finished his manuscript, in which the hotel burns down, the real Hotel Waldhaus also burned down. Charlotte Kerr and Friedrich Dürrenmatt visited the hotel ruins in autumn 1989.

== Exhibitions ==
- Hotel architecture then and now. (2008–2009) Das Gelbe Haus Flims. This exhibitions presents ten hotel biographies, among them „WALDHAUS VULPERA – a case of arson?“.

== Movies ==
The Hotel Waldhaus was used for the BBC-production of F. Scott Fitzgerald's novel «Tender is the Night». There is also a TV documentary about the hotel's history and the conflagration:

- Tender is the Night (1985) BBC TV-production of the novel Tender is the Night (F. Scott Fitzgerald)
- Brand des Hotel Waldhaus in Vulpera (1989) by Claudia Knapp 6 mins.

== Literature ==
- Roland Flückiger-Seiler: Hotelträume zwischen Gletschern und Palmen. Hotelpaläste zwischen Traum und Wirklichkeit. Schweizer Tourismus und Hotelbau 1830–1920. Hier und Jetzt, Baden 2003, ISBN 3-906419-68-1, Pages. 166–219.
- Kristiana Hartmann: Baumeister in Graubünden: Drei Generationen Nicolaus Hartmann (1850 bis 1950) Desertina, Chur 2015, ISBN 978-3-85637-474-7.
- M. Jakob: Der Park der Villa Wilhelmina. Graubünden Magazin, Sommer 2005, Pages. 8–17.
- Marcella Maier: Alte Gärten in der Schweiz: Kurpark Vulpera. Anthos. Zeitschrift für Freiraumgestaltung, Grün- und Landschaftsplanung, 1995, Band 34 (2), Page. 39.
- Ulrich Weber: Das Kurhaus im «Durcheinandertal». Friedrich Dürrenmatt und das «Waldhaus Vulpera» In: Cordula Seger (Hrsg.): Grand Hotel. Bühne der Literatur. Dölling und Galitz, München 2007, ISBN 978-3-937904-54-2, Pages. 159–171.
- Jochen Philipp Ziegelmann: Waldhaus Vulpera: Geheimnisse eines Grandhotels. BoD – Books on Demand, Norderstedt 2020, ISBN 978-3-750425-69-9.

Novels

- Friedrich Dürrenmatt: Durcheinandertal. Diogenes, Zürich 1989; Neuausgabe 1998, ISBN 3-257-23067-2.
- Pauline Lenz: Die Kurärztin. Ein Roman nach dem Leben. Die Rose, München-Unterhaching 1959.
