= Scuol =

- Municipality
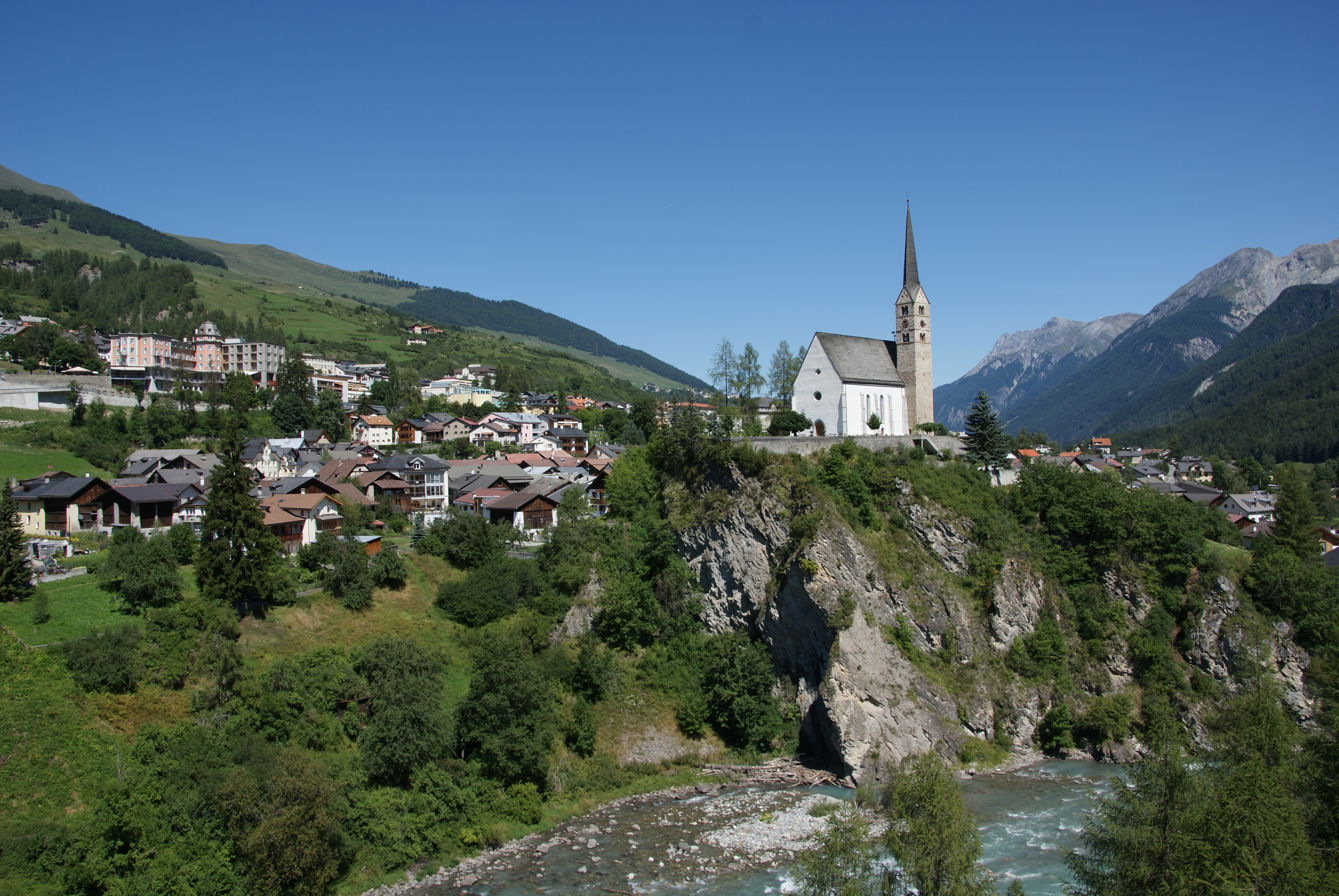

- Flag Coat of arms
- Location of Scuol
- Location within Switzerland Location within Canton of Grisons
- Coordinates: 46°48′N 10°17′E
- Country: Switzerland
- Canton: Grisons
- District: Inn

Area
  - Total: 144.14 km^{2} (55.65 sq mi)
- Elevation: 1,290 m (4,230 ft)

Population (December 2020)
  - Total: 4,624
  - Density: 32.08/km^{2} (83.09/sq mi)
- Time zone: UTC+01:00 (CET)
  - Summer (DST): UTC+02:00 (CEST)
- Postal code: 7550
- SFOS number: 3762
- ISO 3166 code: CH-GR
- Surrounded by: Gaschurn-Partenen (AT), Galtür (AT), Graun im Vinschgau (IT-BZ), Ischgl (AT), Mals (IT-BZ), Taufers im Münstertal (IT-BZ), Val Müstair, Zernez
- Website: www.scuol.ch

Scuol (Romansh: [ˈʃkuɔ̯l]) is a municipality in the Engiadina Bassa/Val Müstair Region in the Swiss canton of Grisons. The official language in Scuol is Romansh. On 1 January 2015 the former municipalities of Ardez, Guarda, Tarasp, Ftan and Sent merged into Scuol.

== Name ==
The official name has undergone several changes in the 20th century:

- Until 1943, the official name of the municipality was Schuls.
- In 1943, it was changed to Bad Scuol/Schuls.
- In 1970 Schuls was dropped as an official name, leaving only Bad Scuol.
- In 1999 Bad was dropped, leaving today's name, Scuol.

== History ==
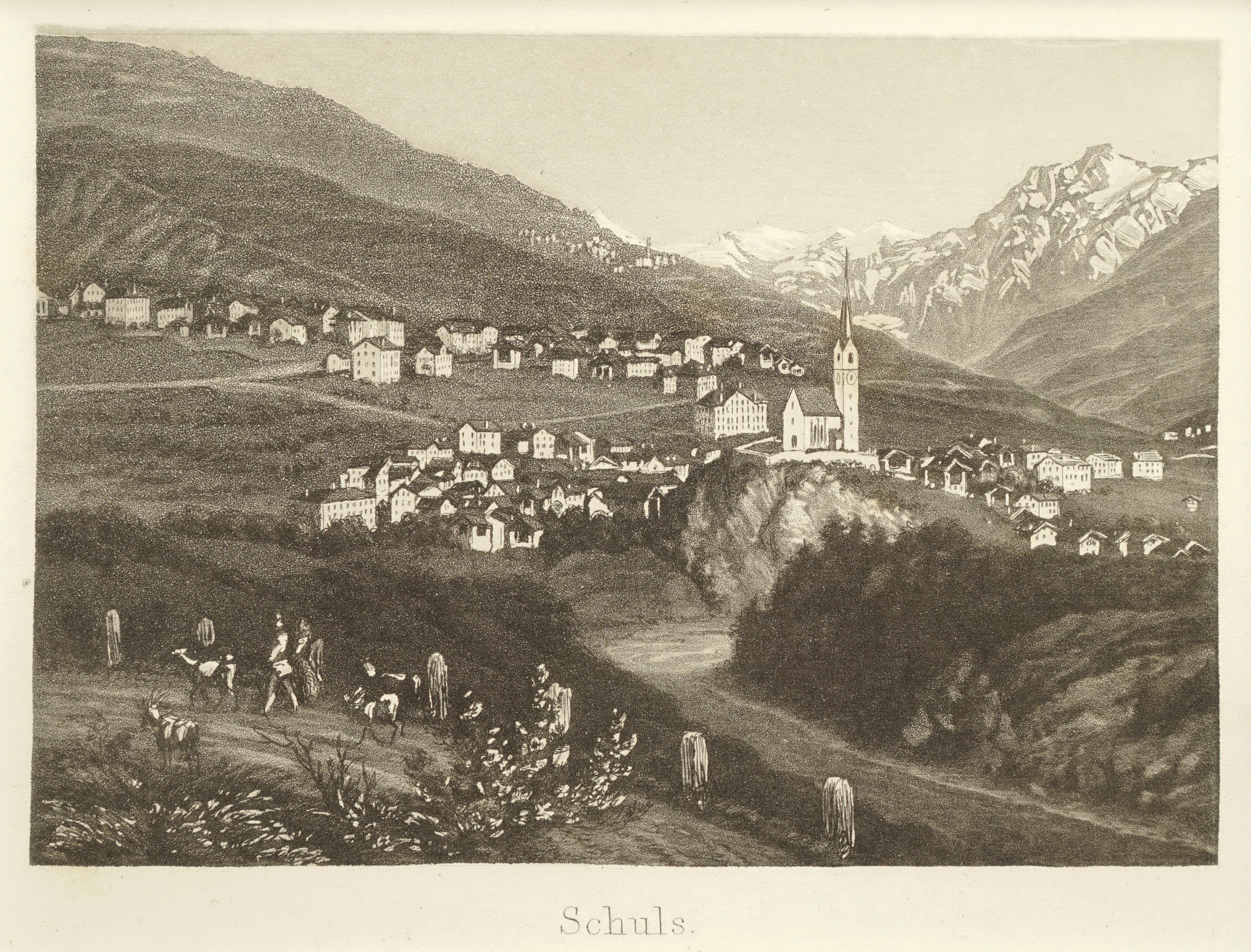
Scuol c. 1870. Etching by Heinrich Müller

Scuol is first mentioned in 1095 as Schulles. At the end of the 11th and in the 12th century, the lords of Tarasp owned extensive estates in Scuol. In 1095/1096 their family founded a Marian monastery in Scuol and endowed it richly. In 1150 the monastery was moved to Marienberg in the Vinschgau valley. In 1178 Pope Alexander III confirmed all of the monastery's possessions in Scuol, including the church.

The village was destroyed in the Swabian War of 1499; in 1516 Bernardo da Poschiavo built a new church. Circa 1533 Scuol became Protestant. In 1621/1622 the village was devastated by Austrian troops; in 1652 it bought its freedom from Austria.

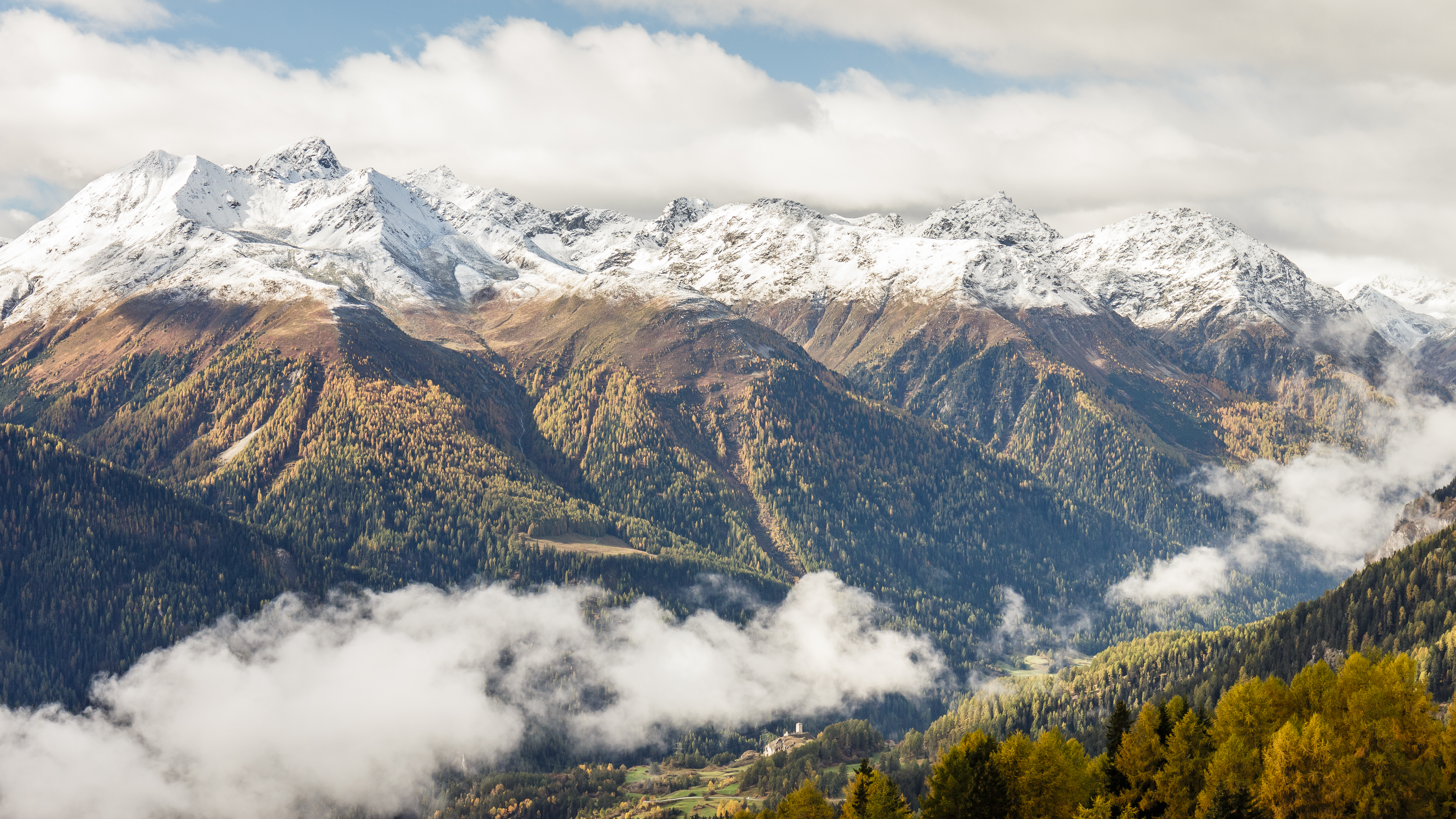
View from Scuol Motta Naluns

From circa 1860 onwards, the healing springs of Scuol were used on a larger scale and the time of spa tourism began. During the following decades, the bath house and numerous hotels were built between the two old parts of the village. The opening of the Bever–Scuol line of the Rhaetian Railway in 1913 stimulated further growth.

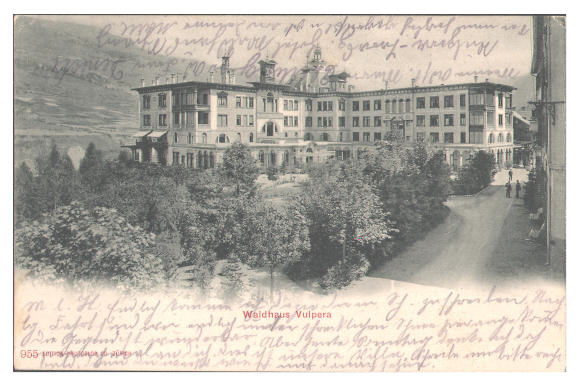
Hotel Waldhaus Vulpera before it burned down on 27 May 1989

With the advent of winter sports in the middle of the 20th century, the second era of tourism in Scuol began. After the gondola lift to Motta Naluns (1956), numerous chairlifts and surface lifts were constructed. The spa tradition was revived in 1993 with the opening of the Bogn Engiadina ("Engadine bath"), including the first Roman-Irish bath in Switzerland.

The Neo-Renaissance style Grand Hotel Waldhaus Vulpera in Scuol-Tarasp with Sgraffito-Elements was opened on 8 June 1897. It was one of the first addresses in the Swiss Alps and a major Belle Époque monument in Europe.

== Geography ==
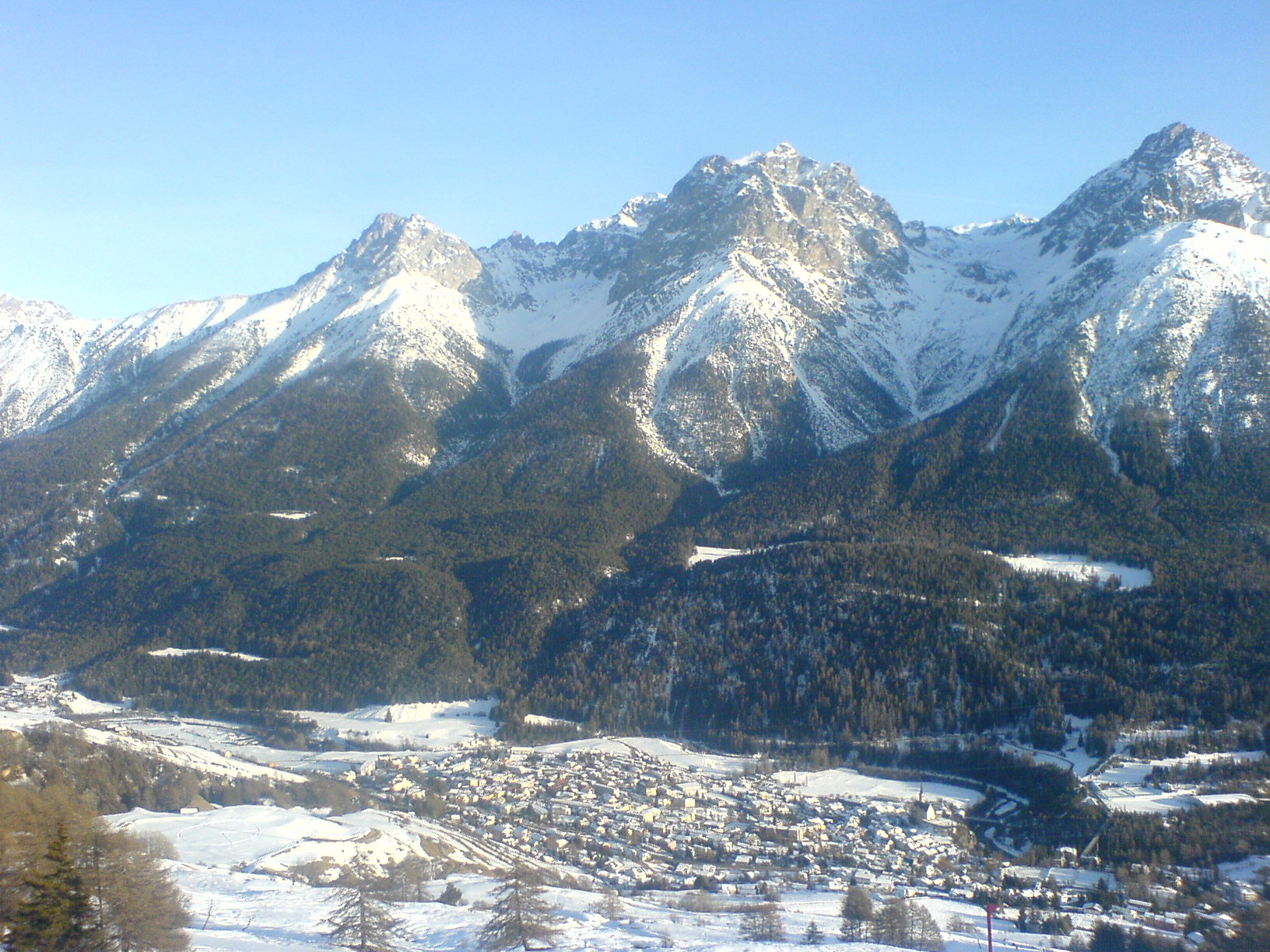
Scuol village and valley

Aerial view (1947)

After the 2015 merger Scuol had an area of 438.63 km^{2} (169.36 sq mi). Before the merger Scuol had an area, (as of the 2004/09 survey) of 144.14 square kilometers (55.65 sq mi). Of this area, about 26.9% is used for agricultural purposes, while 25.8% is forested. Of the rest of the land, 1.2% is settled (buildings or roads) and 46.1% is unproductive land. Over the past two decades (1979/85-2004/09) the amount of land that is settled has increased by 37 ha (91 acres) and the agricultural land has decreased by 146 ha (360 acres).

The whole southern face towards Piz Champatsch on 2,785 meters (9,137 ft) is being used as a skiing area called "Motta Naluns", named after a place north of Scuol. The resort has 80 kilometers of slopes and 12 lifts (aerial cableway/ chair lifts / drag lifts).

Before 2017 it was the municipality is the capital of the Inn district and was located in the Suot Tasna sub-district, after 2017 it was part of the Engiadina Bassa/Val Müstair Region. It is a well known spa town and vacation spot and is the business center of the Unterengadin valley. It is the largest village on the left side of the Inn river. It consists of the village of Scuol with the section Pradella and the old mining village of S-charl. Until 1970 Scuol was known as Scuol/Schuls.

The God da Tamangur ("the forest back there") is the highest continuous stone pine (pinus cembra) forest in Europe, right at the furthest end of the Val S-charl, south of Scuol. The forest nature reserve covers an area of about 84 ha (210 acres) at up to 2,400 m (7,900 ft) in elevation. Due to the altitude and weather, the trees grow very slowly and may live up to 700 years.

== Demographics ==
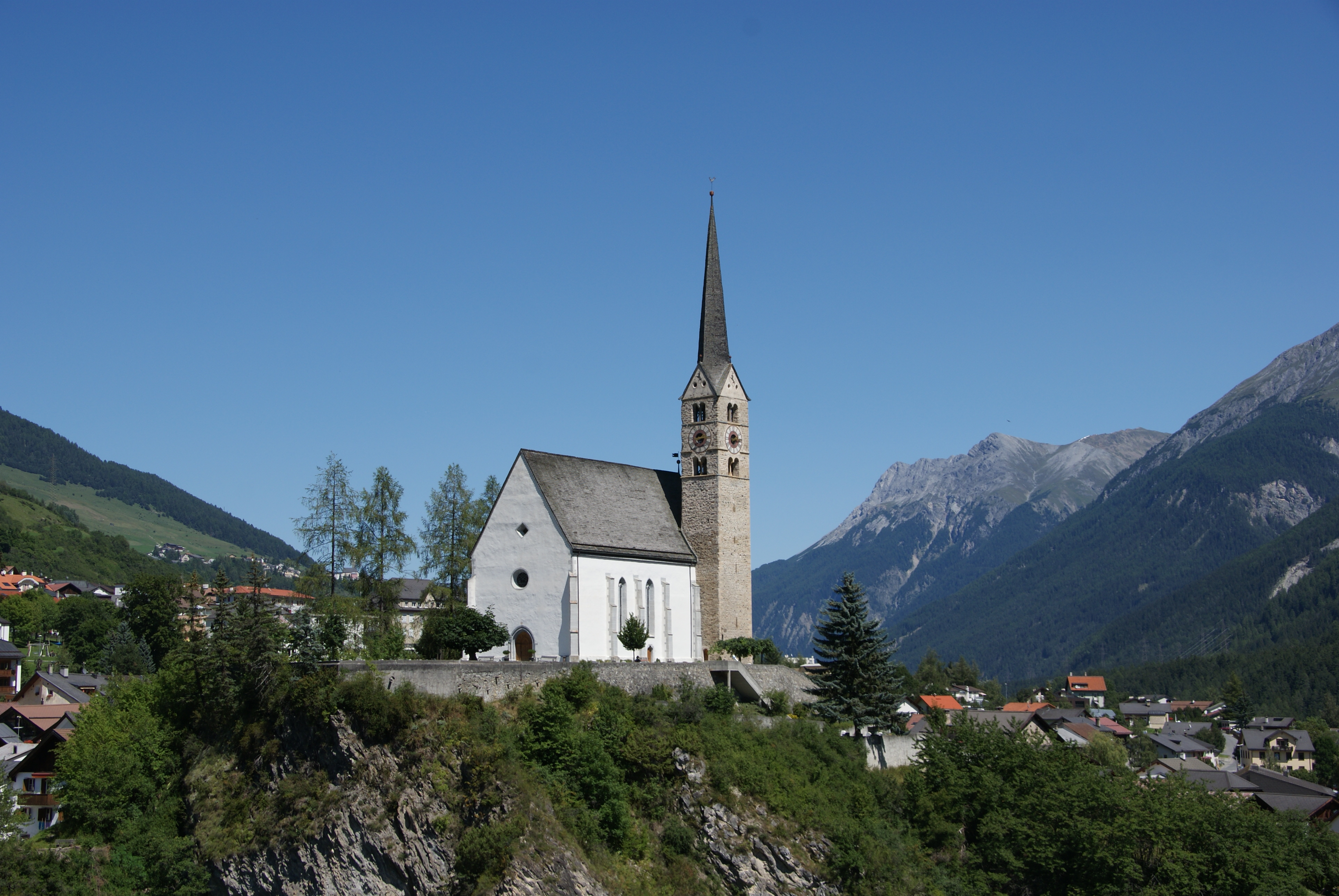
Church in Scuol.

Scuol has a population (as of 31 December 2020) of 4,624. As of 2008, 23.6% of the population was made up of foreign nationals. Over the last 10 years the population has grown at a rate of 1.4%.

As of 2000, the gender distribution of the population was 48.5% male and 51.5% female. The age distribution, as of 2000, in Scuol is; 220 children or 10.4% of the population are between 0 and 9 years old. 106 teenagers or 5.0% are 10 to 14, and 139 teenagers or 6.6% are 15 to 19. Of the adult population, 248 people or 11.7% of the population are between 20 and 29 years old. 334 people or 15.7% are 30 to 39, 306 people or 14.4% are 40 to 49, and 278 people or 13.1% are 50 to 59. The senior population distribution is 201 people or 9.5% of the population are between 60 and 69 years old, 154 people or 7.3% are 70 to 79, there are 115 people or 5.4% who are 80 to 89, and there are 21 people or 1.0% who are 90 to 99.

In 2013 there were 1,073 private households in Scuol. Of the 694 inhabited buildings in the municipality, in 2000, about 41.6% were single family homes and 36.6% were multiple family buildings. Additionally, about 36.5% of the buildings were built before 1919, while 11.4% were built between 1991 and 2000. In 2012 the rate of construction of new housing units per 1000 residents was 20.57. The vacancy rate for the municipality, in 2014, was 2.48%.

== Historic Population ==
The historical population is given in the following chart:

== Languages ==
Half of the population (as of 2000) speaks Romansh (49.4%), with German being second most common (39.2%) and Italian being third ( 3.9%). Scuol is host to a branch of the Lia Rumantscha.

Languages in Scuol
Languages	Census 1980		Census 1990		Census 2000	
Languages	Number	Percent	Number	Percent	Number	Percent
Romansh	1130	64.79%	1087	57.54%	1049	49.43%
German	484	27.75%	651	34.46%	831	39.16%
Italian	76	4.36%	77	4.08%	82	3.86%
Population	1744	100%	1889	100%	2122	100%

== Economy ==
As of 2012, there were a total of 2,240 people employed in the municipality. Of these, a total of 39 people worked in 13 businesses in the primary economic sector. The secondary sector employed 394 workers in 33 separate businesses. Finally, the tertiary sector provided 1,807 jobs in 265 businesses. In 2013 a total of 20.6% of the population received social assistance.

== Politics ==
In the 2011 federal election the most popular party was the BDP with 43.2% of the vote. The next three most popular parties were the SVP (20.1%), the SP (15.1%) and the FDP (10.3%). In the federal election, a total of 666 votes were cast, and the voter turnout was 46.0%.

== Crime ==
In 2014 the crime rate, of the over 200 crimes listed in the Swiss Criminal Code (running from murder, robbery and assault to accepting bribes and election fraud), in Scuol was 41.3 per thousand residents. This rate is only 63.9% of the average rate in the entire country. During the same period, the rate of drug crimes was 8.5 per thousand residents and the rate of violations of immigration, visa and work permit laws was 0.9 per thousand.

== Education ==
In Scuol about 69.7% of the population (between age 25–64) have completed either non-mandatory upper secondary education or additional higher education (either university or a Fachhochschule).

== Transportation ==
The municipality has four railway stations: Scuol-Tarasp, Ftan Baraigla, Ardez, and Guarda. All four are located on the Bever–Scuol-Tarasp line with regular service to Disentis/Mustér and Pontresina.

== Hospital ==
There is one small regional hospital, called Ospidal Engiadina Bassa (Romansh: Hospital of the Lower Engadin). The hospital celebrated its 100th anniversary on 21 June 2008. It is one of the country's smallest hospitals, offering basic services such as departments of surgery, internal medicine, cardiology, dermatology, oncology, gynecology, a 24-hour Emergency Department, and a 2-bed intensive care unit. Understandably for a mountain resort with a major ski region, orthopedic procedures are very common.

== Heritage sites of national significance ==
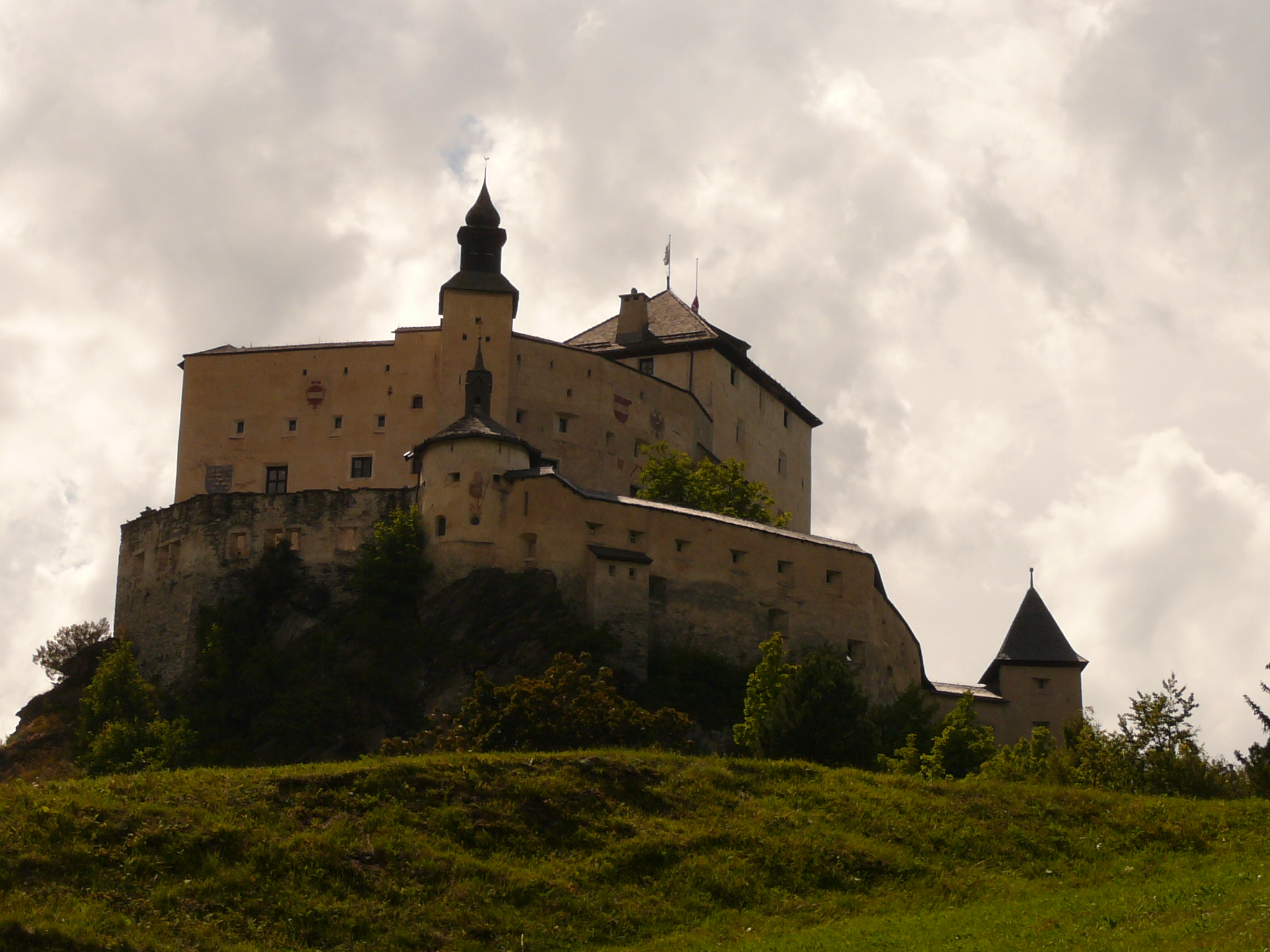
Tarasp Castle

The Baselgia refurmada, the Chasa Wieland Nr. 29 and the Kurhaus Bad Tarasp (spa Bad Tarasp) in Scuol, the Chasté (a prehistoric site, a medieval fortress and a church) and the Doppelwohnhaus (Double-house) in Ardez, Tarasp Castle and the Trinkhalle (drinking hall) in Tarasp are all listed as Swiss heritage sites of national significance.

The Chastè site includes settlements from the late Bronze Age (Melauner culture) into the early Iron Age (Fritzens-Sanzeno culture) as well as some finds from the Roman Empire.

The Chasa Wieland Nr.29 in Scuol village was built around a three-story medieval stone tower. It was likely built by one of a few Grisons noble families. The tower may have been damaged when Scuol was destroyed in 1499 during the Swabian War, but if so it was quickly repaired. During the Bündner Wirren, in 1622, Scuol and the tower were burned. Soon thereafter a farmhouse was built over the ruins, incorporating the 1 m (3.3 ft) thick walls. Some of the doorways are from the tower, while new windows had to be broken into the walls. The date 1753 was carved into the lintel. The walls still show the Pietra Rasa construction, where the mortar that holds the rough stones together is also used as a plaster to them. After plastering with mortar, lines are incised into the mortar to give the appearance of regular bricks or stones.

== Climate ==
Due to its geographical positioning, being located in the depth of a valley, Scuol features a warm-summer humid continental climate (Köppen: "Dfb") with moderate summers and chilly winters, which is usually accompanied with occasional snowfall. Despite seeing an average low of −8º in its coldest month, the winters here are not as cold as the towns upstream (such as St. Moritz). The town sees an average of 94.5 days of rain per year and on average receives 708 mm (27.9 in) of precipitation. The wettest month is August during which time Scuol receives an average of 109 mm (4.3 in) of precipitation. During this month there is precipitation for an average of 11.8 days. The driest month of the year is February with an average of 27 mm (1.1 in) of precipitation over 4.9 days.

Climate data for Scuol, elevation 1,304 m (4,278 ft), (1991–2020)
Month	Jan	Feb	Mar	Apr	May	Jun	Jul	Aug	Sep	Oct	Nov	Dec	Year
Mean daily maximum °C (°F)	0.0 (32.0)	2.9 (37.2)	8.7 (47.7)	13.0 (55.4)	17.1 (62.8)	21.1 (70.0)	23.1 (73.6)	22.6 (72.7)	18.1 (64.6)	13.2 (55.8)	5.8 (42.4)	0.3 (32.5)	12.2 (54.0)
Daily mean °C (°F)	−4.3 (24.3)	−2.7 (27.1)	1.8 (35.2)	6.0 (42.8)	10.3 (50.5)	13.8 (56.8)	15.5 (59.9)	15.0 (59.0)	11.0 (51.8)	6.5 (43.7)	0.9 (33.6)	−3.3 (26.1)	5.9 (42.6)
Mean daily minimum °C (°F)	−8.0 (17.6)	−7.3 (18.9)	−3.5 (25.7)	0.1 (32.2)	4.3 (39.7)	7.6 (45.7)	9.3 (48.7)	9.3 (48.7)	5.6 (42.1)	1.8 (35.2)	−2.8 (27.0)	−6.7 (19.9)	0.8 (33.4)
Average precipitation mm (inches)	37.7 (1.48)	27.4 (1.08)	34.5 (1.36)	34.8 (1.37)	52.8 (2.08)	80.5 (3.17)	88.4 (3.48)	108.7 (4.28)	65.3 (2.57)	68.8 (2.71)	62.8 (2.47)	46.6 (1.83)	708.3 (27.89)
Average snowfall cm (inches)	50.7 (20.0)	39.3 (15.5)	20.1 (7.9)	6.5 (2.6)	0.6 (0.2)	0.2 (0.1)	0.0 (0.0)	0.0 (0.0)	0.2 (0.1)	5.9 (2.3)	23.5 (9.3)	48.7 (19.2)	195.7 (77.0)
Average precipitation days (≥ 1.0 mm)	5.9	4.9	5.2	6.0	9.1	10.6	11.0	11.8	8.0	8.0	7.2	6.8	94.5
Average snowy days (≥ 1.0 cm)	7.8	6.3	4.0	1.8	0.2	0.0	0.0	0.0	0.0	0.6	4.3	7.4	32.4
Average relative humidity (%)	75	69	63	61	64	66	68	71	73	75	78	77	70
Mean monthly sunshine hours	97.6	115.9	161.6	170.3	176.0	189.7	213.6	195.4	164.1	138.3	87.5	75.1	1,785.1
Percentage possible sunshine	55	54	54	50	44	47	53	53	53	54	48	48	51
Source 1: NOAA
Source 2: MeteoSwiss

== Notable people ==
- Felix Calonder, Swiss politician
- Tonia Maria Zindel, Swiss actress
