= Tarasp =

- Former municipality
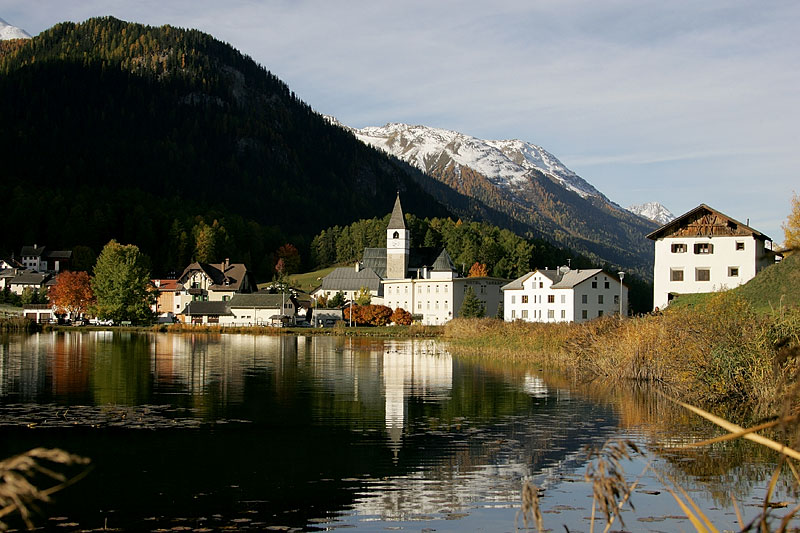
- Lake Tarasp at dawn

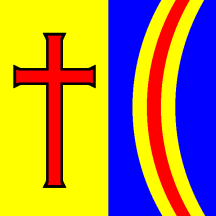
- Flag Coat of arms
- Location of Tarasp
- Location within Switzerland Location within Canton of Graubünden
- Coordinates: 46°46′N 10°15′E
- Country: Switzerland
- Canton: Graubünden
- District: Inn

Area
  - Total: 46.9 km^{2} (18.1 sq mi)
- Elevation: 1,403 m (4,603 ft)

Population (Dec 2014)
  - Total: 337
  - Density: 7.19/km^{2} (18.6/sq mi)
- Time zone: UTC+01:00 (CET)
  - Summer (DST): UTC+02:00 (CEST)
- Postal code: 7553
- SFOS number: 3745
- ISO 3166 code: CH-GR
- Localities: Fontana, Vulpera, Sparsels, Aschera, Avrona, Chaposch, Chants, Florins, Nairs, Sgnè, Vallatscha
- Surrounded by: Ardez, Ftan, Scuol, Tschierv, Zernez
- Website: www.tarasp.ch

Tarasp is a former municipality in the district of Inn in the Swiss canton of Graubünden. Its eleven settlements are situated within the Lower Engadin valley along the Inn River, at the foot of the Sesvenna Range. On 1 January 2015 the former municipalities of Ardez, Guarda, Tarasp, Ftan and Sent merged into the municipality of Scuol.

Originally a Romansh language area, the majority of the population today speaks High Alemannic German. Unlike the surrounding municipalities, the Tarasp parish is mainly Catholic.

== History ==
Primitive grinding stones known as Schalensteine or Hexensteine were found in the Tarasp area. This indicates that Stone Age food processing happened in the area. However, there are no records or indications of settlements in the area until the 11th century.

Aerial view (1954)

The Lordship of Tarasp Castle was established in the 11th century and for centuries claimed by the Bishopric of Chur and the Counts of Tyrol. After the Lords of Tarasp had become extinct, their estates became a Tyrolean fief in 1239. In 1273 the Counts of Matsch held Tarasp as Vogts for the Counts of Tyrol. They remained the Vogt of Tarasp when the Habsburg archdukes of Austria became the Counts of Tyrol in 1363. From 1422 until his death in 1436, it was owned by Frederick VII of Toggenburg. After his death, the Matsch family held it again until 1463, when it was sold to the Habsburg. With this sale, Tarasp became an Austrian exclave inside the Free State of the Three Leagues, an associate of the Old Swiss Confederacy in 1464. In 1687 Holy Roman Emperor, Emperor Leopold I granted the Lordship of Tarasp to the Princes of Dietrichstein as an immediate territory of the Holy Roman Empire.

In the course of the 1803 Reichsdeputationshauptschluss and the Act of Mediation, Austria finally ceded the territory to the Napoleonic Swiss Confederation, after which it was incorporated into the canton of Graubünden.

The Neo-Renaissance style Grand Hotel Waldhaus Vulpera-Tarasp with Sgraffito-Elements was opened on 8 June 1897 and was one of the first addresses in the Swiss Alps and was a major Belle Époque monument in Europe.

== Geography ==
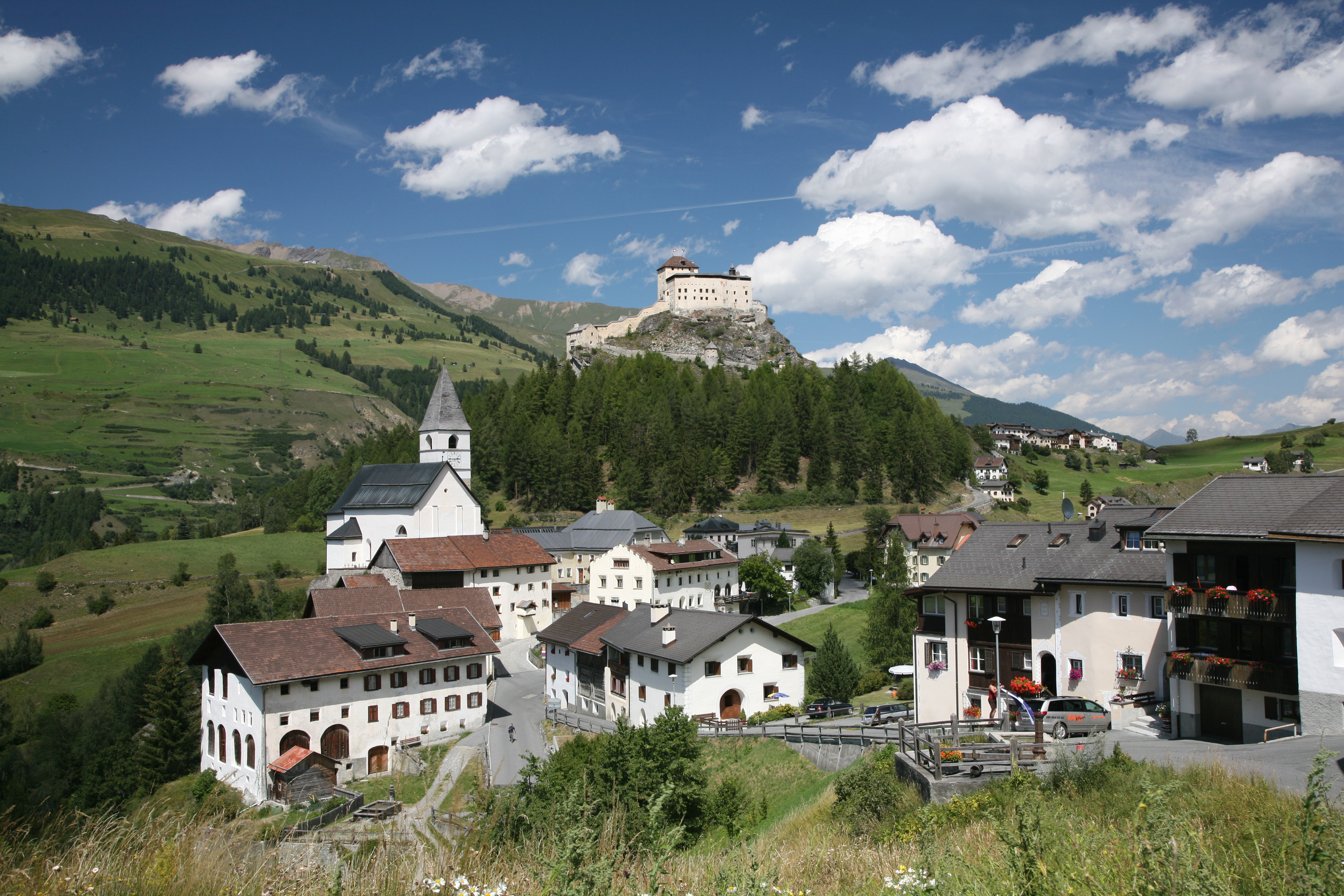
Fontana and Tarasp castle

Tarasp had an area, as of 2006, of 46.9 km^{2} (18.1 sq mi). Of this area, 12.9% is used for agricultural purposes, while 34.6% is forested. Of the rest of the land, 0.9% is settled (buildings or roads) and the remainder (51.6%) is non-productive (rivers, glaciers or mountains).

The former municipality is located in the Sur Tasna sub-district of the Inn district on the right bank of the Inn river. It consists of the village of Tarasp with 10 sections and the castle hill.

== Demographics ==
Tarasp had a population (as of 2014) of 337. As of 2008, 36.5% of the population was made up of foreign nationals. Over the last 10 years the population has grown at a rate of 14.9%.

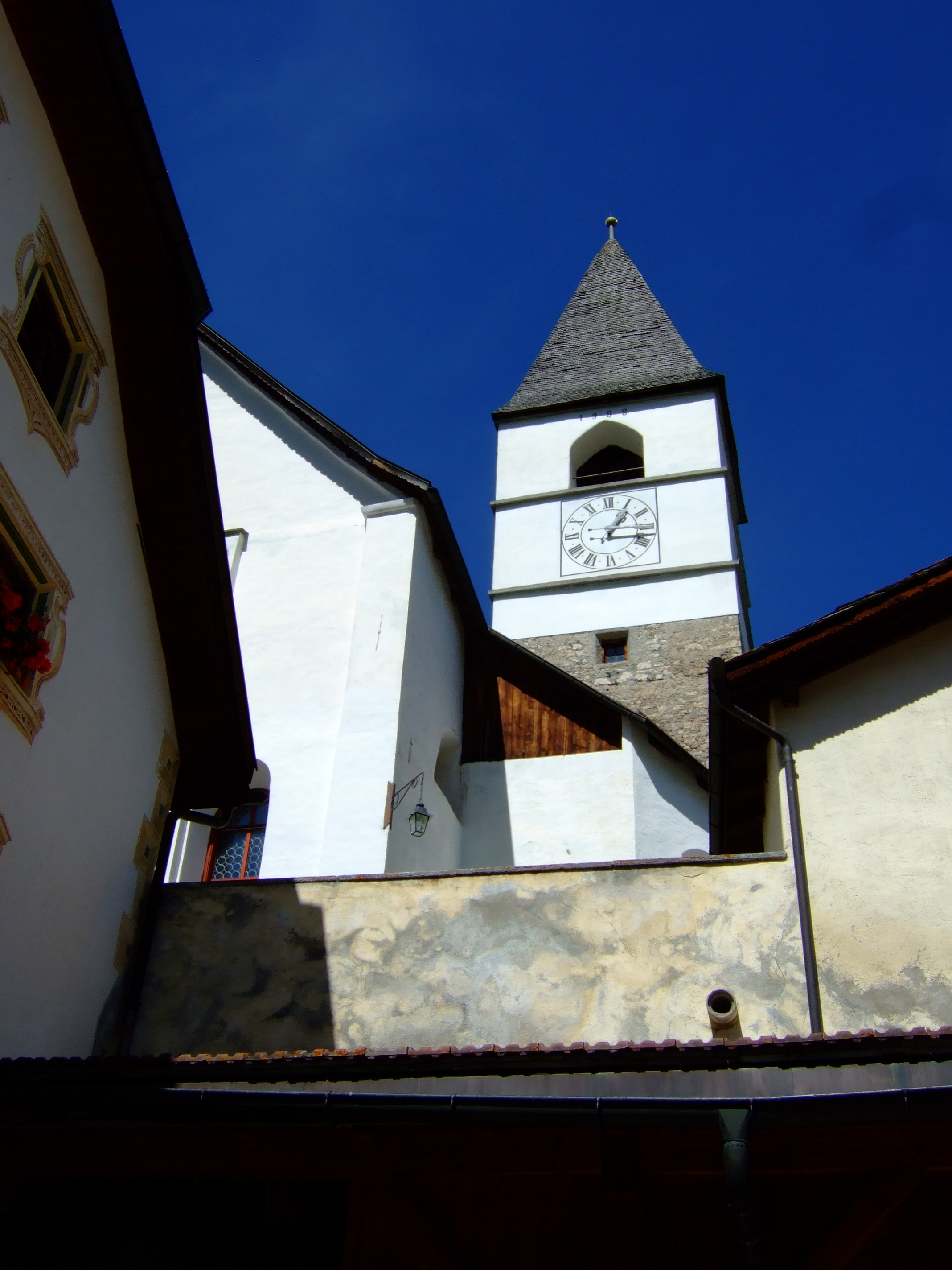
Church in Tarasp-Fontana

As of 2000, the gender distribution of the population was 49.2% male and 50.8% female. The age distribution, as of 2000, in Tarasp is; 26 children or 7.9% of the population are between 0 and 9 years old. 37 teenagers or 11.3% are 10 to 14, and 22 teenagers or 6.7% are 15 to 19. Of the adult population, 30 people or 9.1% of the population are between 20 and 29 years old. 42 people or 12.8% are 30 to 39, 53 people or 16.2% are 40 to 49, and 38 people or 11.6% are 50 to 59. The senior population distribution is 30 people or 9.1% of the population are between 60 and 69 years old, 27 people or 8.2% are 70 to 79, there are 21 people or 6.4% who are 80 to 89, and there are 2 people or 0.6% who are 90 to 99.

In the 2007 federal election the most popular party was the SVP which received 44% of the vote. The next three most popular parties were the CVP (34.5%), the SPS (16.3%) and the FDP (5.2%).

In Tarasp about 66.8% of the population (between age 25 and 64) have completed either non-mandatory upper secondary education or additional higher education (either university or a Fachhochschule).

Tarasp has an unemployment rate of 3.83%. As of 2005, there were 17 people employed in the primary economic sector and about 6 businesses involved in this sector. 9 people are employed in the secondary sector and there are 4 businesses in this sector. 220 people are employed in the tertiary sector, with 21 businesses in this sector.

The historical population is given in the following table:

year	population
1630	242
1835	403
1850	357
1900	278
1950	307
2000	328

== Languages ==
Most of the population (as of 2000) speaks German (52.4%), with Romansh being second most common (38.4%) and Portuguese being third (3.4%). Despite centuries of Austrian rule, until World War I the population spoke the Romansh dialect Vallader. In 1880, 92% spoke Romansh, and in 1910 it was 87%. By World War II the percentage had dropped to 79% (in 1941). German continued to gain ground, but even in 1970 45.3% of the population spoke Romansh. In 1990 a total of 58% could speak Romansh, though not all spoke it as a first language, and in 2000 a total of 46.6% could understand Romansh.

Languages in Tarasp
Languages	Census 1980		Census 1990		Census 2000	
Languages	Number	Percent	Number	Percent	Number	Percent
German	138	47.10%	125	51.87%	172	52.44%
Romansh	129	44.03%	102	42.32%	126	38.41%
Italian	8	2.73%	8	3.32%	8	2.44%
Population	293	100%	241	100%	328	100%

== Heritage sites of national significance ==
Tarasp Castle and the Trinkhalle (drinking hall) are listed as Swiss heritage sites of national significance.

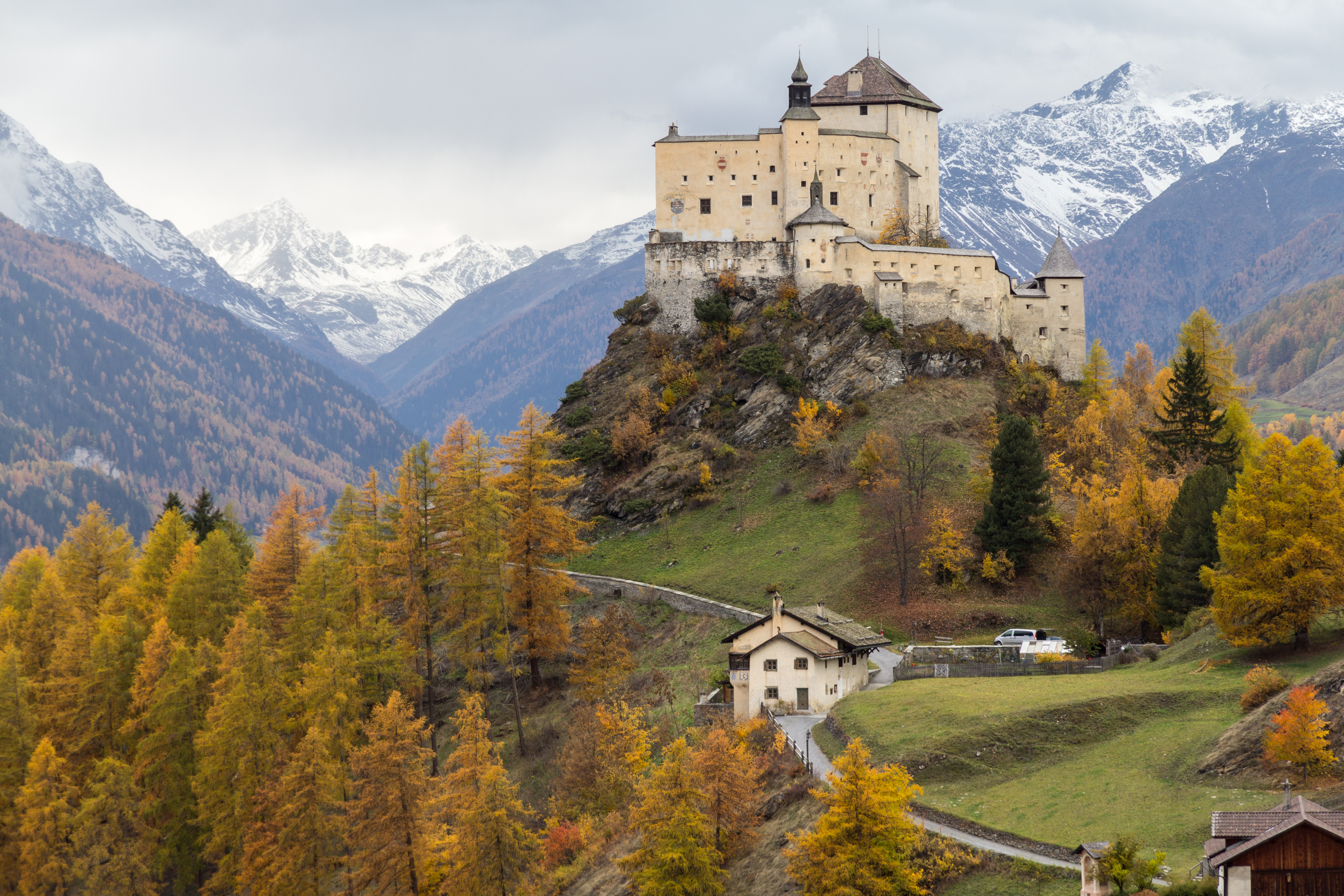
Tarasp Castle

== Transportation ==
The Scuol-Tarasp station is the eastern terminus of the private Rhaetian Railway network, served by trains from Chur and Pontresina.

== See also ==
- Engadine Line
- Tarasp Castle
- Lai da Tarasp
- Lai Nair
