= Not Vital =

Swiss-American sculptor (1948-)

- Born: Not Vital; 15 February 1948 (age 78); Sent, Switzerland (now Scuol, Switzerland)

Not Vital (born 15 February 1948) is a Swiss American artist, sculptor and philanthropist who is primarily known for large-scale sculptures, conceptual installations and architecture.

== Early life and education ==
Vital was born 15 February 1948 in Sent, Switzerland, the third of four children, to Mario Otto Vital (1910–1998), a wood wholesaler, and Donna Maria Vital (née Fontana; 1916–2016). His siblings are; Mengia Riatsch (née Vital), Jon Vital and Duri Vital. His mother tongue is Romansh and Swiss German is his second language.

He was raised in the Engadine valley, where his family has been deeply rooted for many generations, attending the local schools. During his teens he was first introduced into the art world by Max Huggler (1903–1994), a noted art historian, curator and professor, who owned a chalet on top of the village of Sent.

Vital graduated from Cantonal School of Graubünden in Chur and ultimately studied at the Centre universitaire expérimental de Vincennes in Paris, France from 1968 to 1969.

== Career ==
In 1974, aged 26, Vital relocated to New York City where he launched his career in the art world.

== Personal life ==
Vital is unmarried and has no children.

In 2016, he purchased Tarasp Castle for 7.9 million Swiss Francs.
