= Tarasp Castle =

Castle in Switzerland

- Chastè da Tarasp
- Scuol
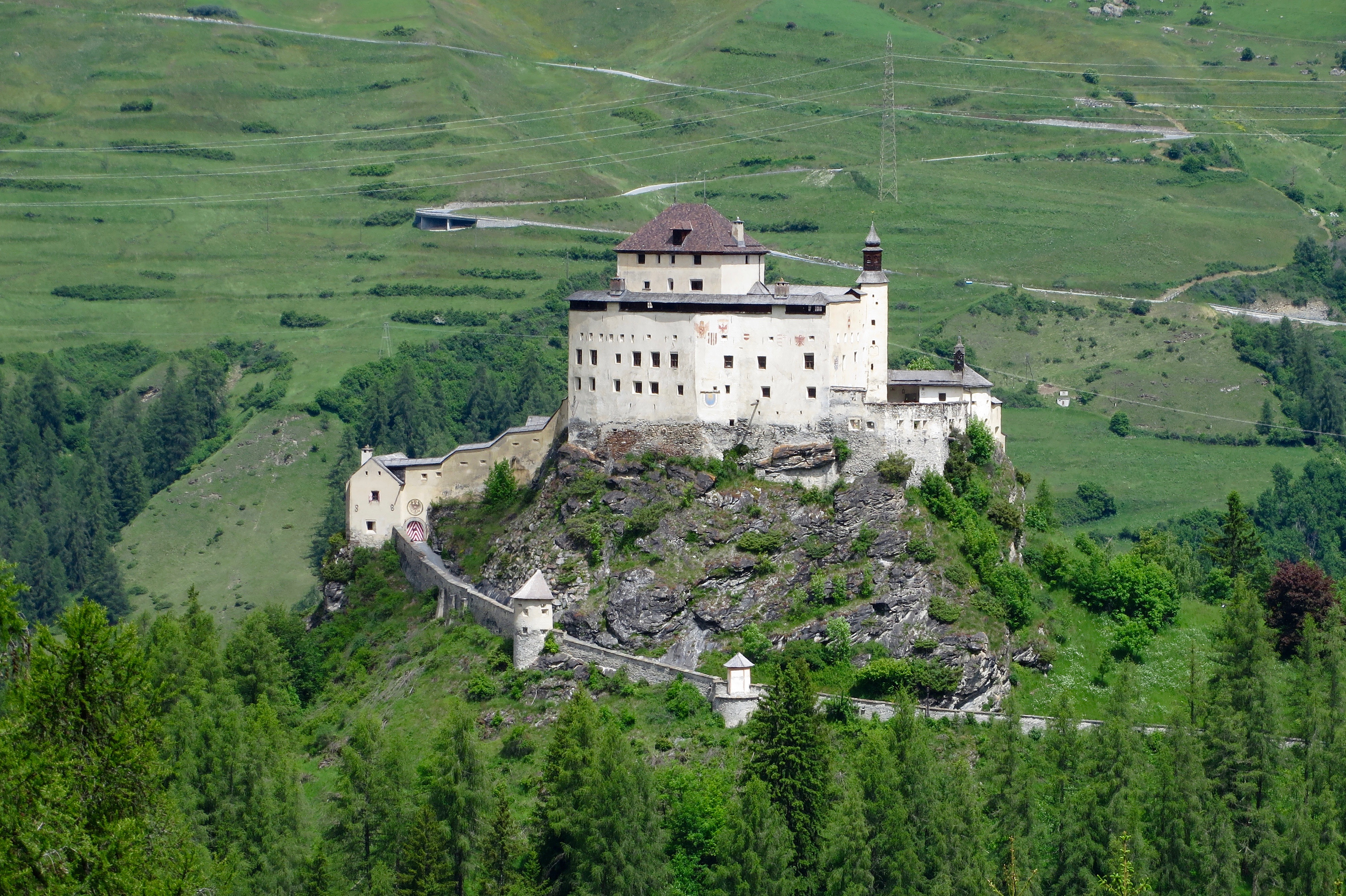

Site information
- Type: hill castle
- Code: CH-GR

Location
- Location within Canton of Graubünden Location within Switzerland
- Coordinates: 46°46′44″N 10°15′42″E
- Height: 1,499 m above the sea

Site history
- Built: 11th century

Tarasp Castle (German: Schloss Tarasp, Romansh: Chastè da Tarasp) is a castle in Switzerland, near the former municipality of Tarasp (now Scuol), in Lower Engadin, Graubünden. It is a Swiss heritage site of national significance.

== History ==
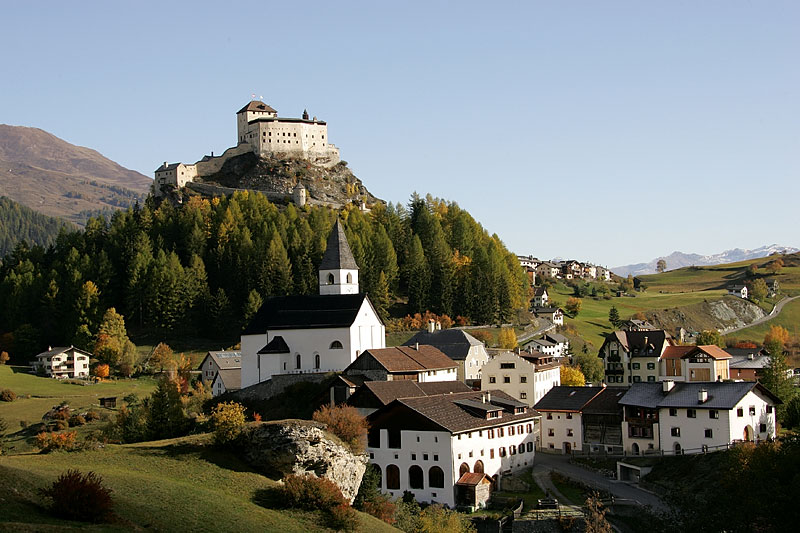
The Tarasp castle on the hill, overlooking the Tarasp village, Switzerland, (2005)

Tarasp Castle was probably built in the 11th century or possibly as early as the 10th century. The name comes from terra aspera or wild earth, which may refer to the new lands in the Inn river valley. They had adopted the name of the castle by 1089 when Ulrich von Tarasp was mentioned in a papal mandate to the Bishop of Chur. Around the same time the family founded Scuol Monastery, which later moved to Marienberg Abbey, as part of their program to carve out a barony in the formerly uninhabited high alpine valley. At this time the castle consisted of a ring wall and a chapel with a bell tower that also served as a watch tower.

In 1160 Ulrich II donated his portion of the castle to the Bishop of Chur. However, his nephew and co-owner Gerhard, with the support of the Count of Tyrol, seized the castle and drove out the bishop's troops in 1163. The bishop, together with Ulrich von Tarasp and his cousin Egino von Matsch, besieged the castle and eventually forced Gerhard to compromise. The castle became the bishop's, but Gerhard and his descendants would hold the castle as their fief. If Gerhard died without an heir, the castle would revert to the bishop. In 1170 Gerhard died a violent death, followed by the last male heir, Ulrich, in 1177. The castle passed to the bishop while the Matsch family inherited the Abbey. In 1200 the bishop appointed the Reichenberg family as his vogt or representative in Tarasp Castle. In 1239 Swiker von Reichenberg, ignoring the bishop's claim, sold the castle to Albert of Tyrol. Beginning in 1273 the House of Matsch received Tarasp castle as vassals of Tyrol.

The Matsch family held Tarasp for about a century and a half. When the lands of the Counts of Tyrol were inherited by the Dukes of Austria, the Matschs became Habsburg vassals. In 1422 Frederick VII of Toggenburg inherited Tarasp through his wife Elisabeth von Matsch, but when he died in 1436, it returned to the Matsch family. In 1464 Ulrich IX von Matsch sold the castle to Sigmund of Austria, which triggered an uprising in Lower Engadine. While the Austrians were able to retain control over the region, relations remained tense between the castle and the locals. When the Protestant Reformation was adopted in Engadine the situation became worse. In 1548 and again in 1578 Protestant locals attacked and attempted to capture the castle. Despite additional fortifications, in 1612 they successfully stormed and burned Tarasp. A lightning strike in 1625 set the castle on fire again and killed the daughter of the Austrian representative in the castle.

In 1687 Leopold I, Holy Roman Emperor granted the Lordship and the castle of Tarasp to the Austrian House of Dietrichstein as an immediate territory of the Holy Roman Empire. After the French invasion of Switzerland and the creation of the Helvetic Republic, in 1803 the castle was taken from the Austrians and given to the Republic. In the course of the 1803 Reichsdeputationshauptschluss and the Act of Mediation, it was incorporated into the Canton of Graubünden. Throughout this period, the castle was often expanded and renovated to its present appearance. After about 1815 the castle was abandoned and rapidly fell into ruin.

Initially the Canton planned to turn the castle into a prison, but eventually gave up the idea as too expensive and began looking for a buyer. The von Planta family bought it in 1856, began repairing it and replaced the damaged roof. In 1900 it was purchased by Dr. Lingner of Dresden, who restored the castle for a decade from 1906 to 1916. After his death, Grand Duke Ernest Louis of Hesse inherited the castle from Lingner. It was turned into a museum in 1919. In 2004 the von Hessen family announced that they wanted to sell the castle. In 2008 the municipality of Tarasp agreed to investigate purchasing it and converting it into a cultural and tourist attraction. In 2010 the Fundaziun Chastè da Tarasp was created to seek funding and administer the castle after it was purchased. After the Foundation struggled to raise funding, in 2015 Swiss artist Not Vital announced that he would purchase the castle. In March 2016 Not Vital acquired the castle for CHF 7.9 million.

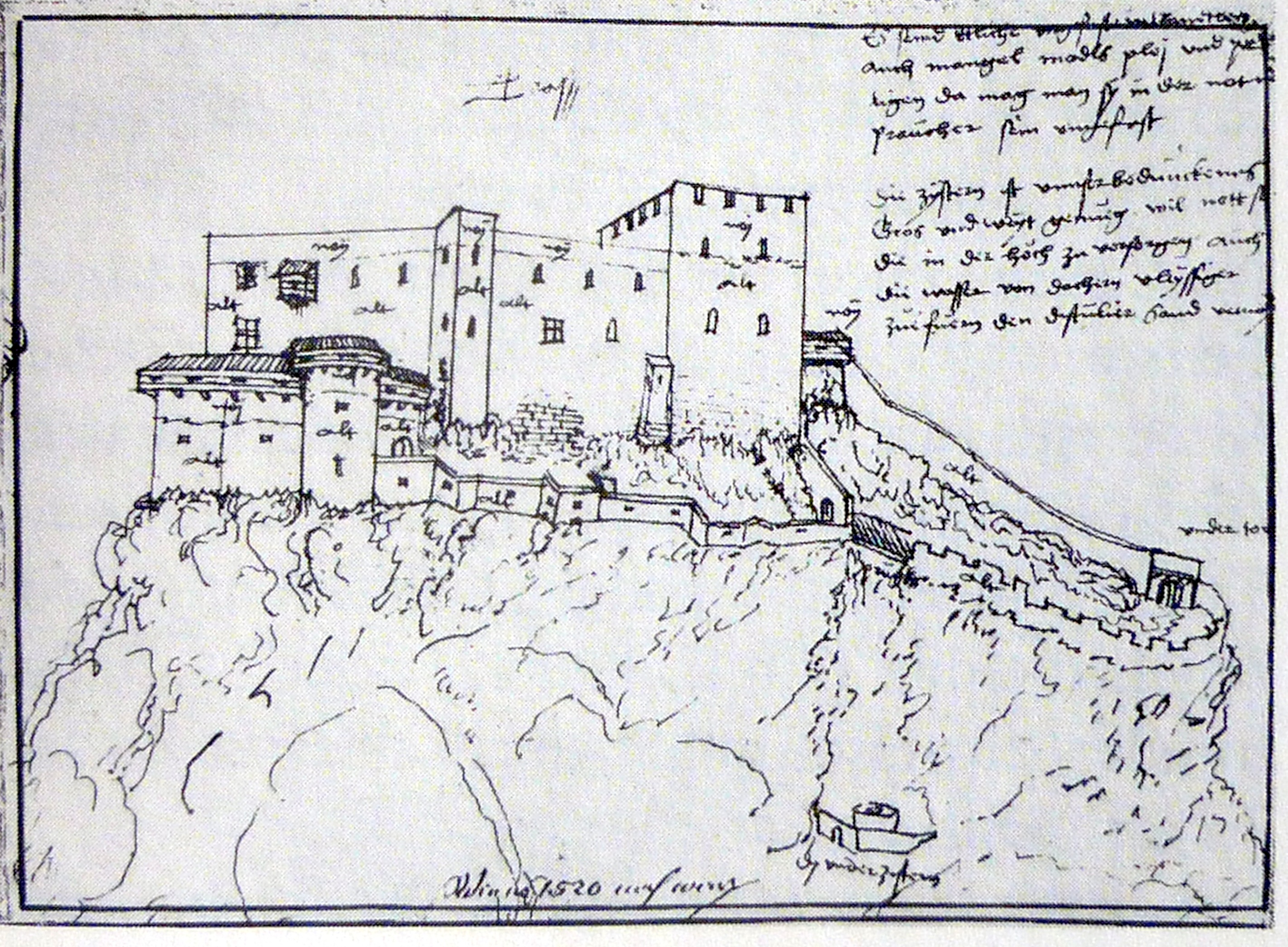
Tarasp in 1520

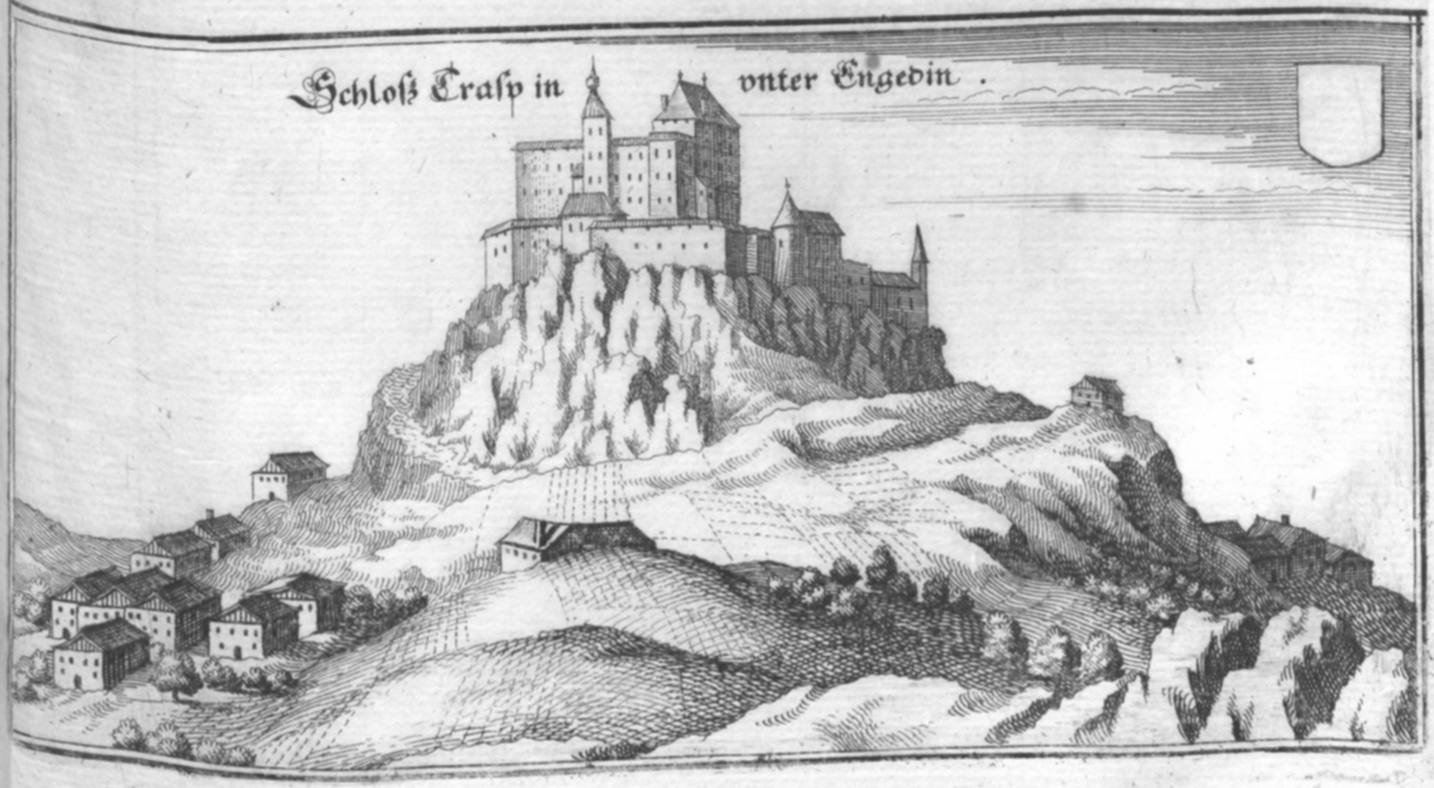
The castle in 1679

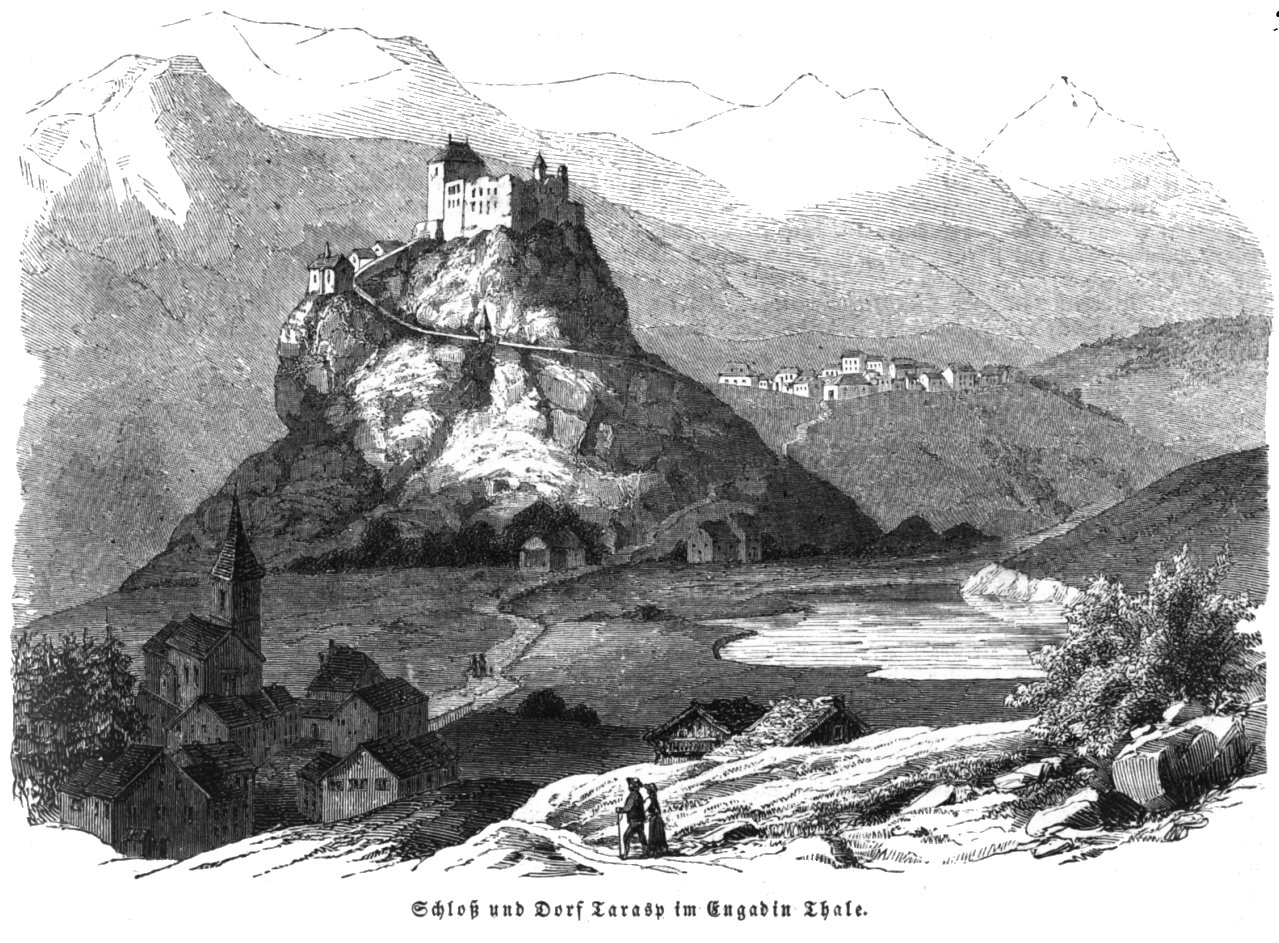
Appearance in 1854

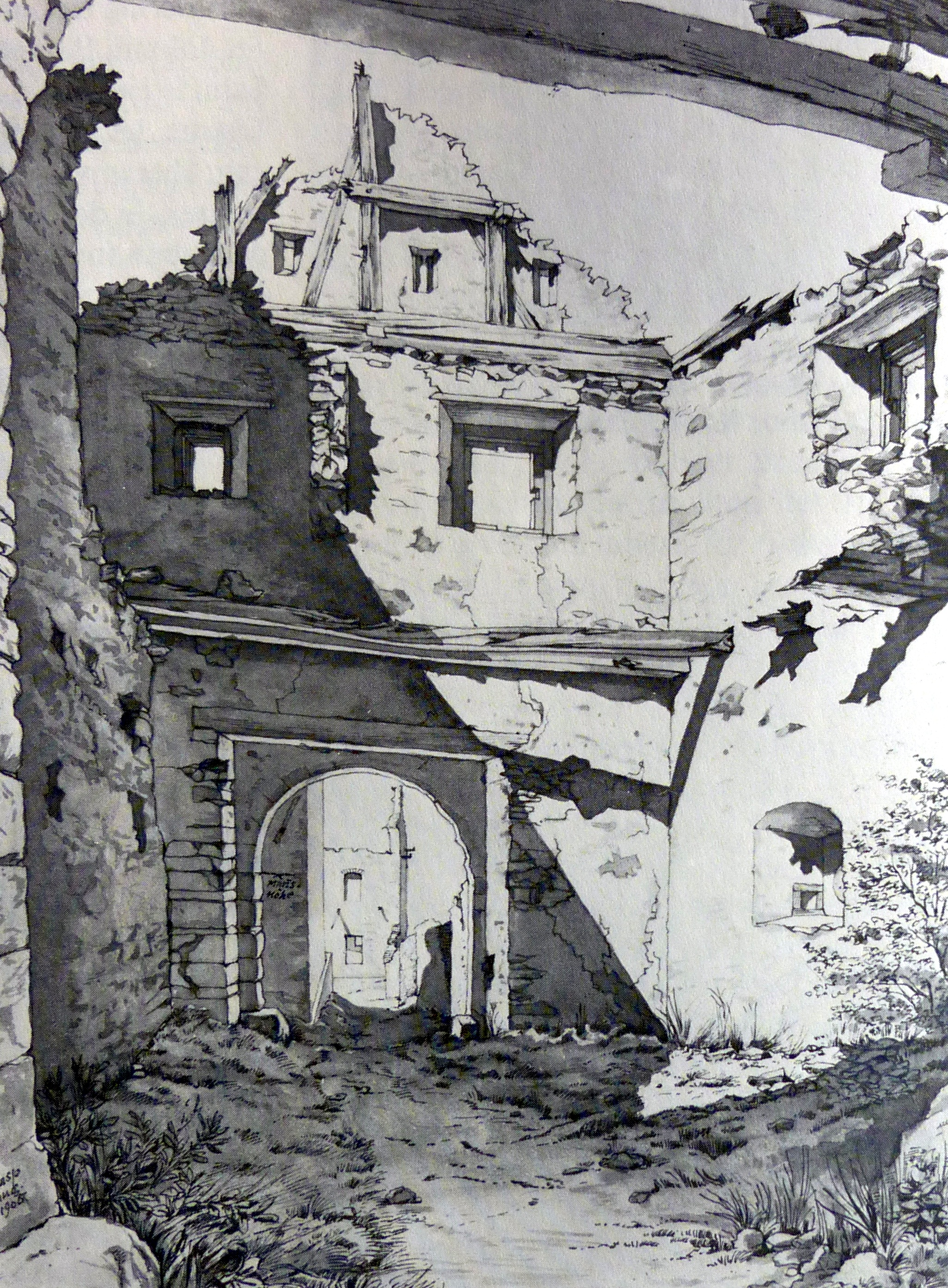
The castle in 1904

Aerial view by Walter Mittelholzer (1925)

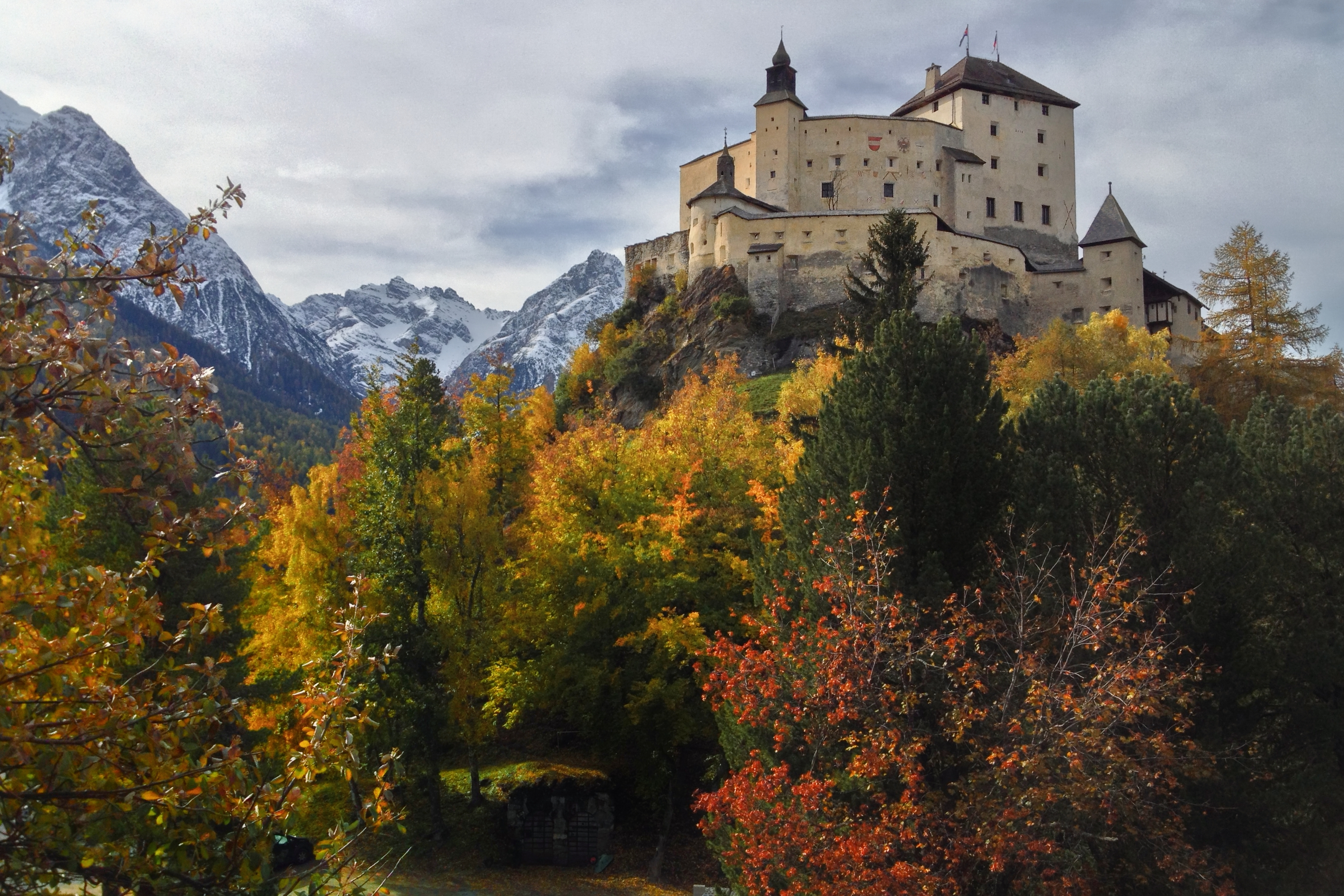
The castle with the Engadine Dolomites in background

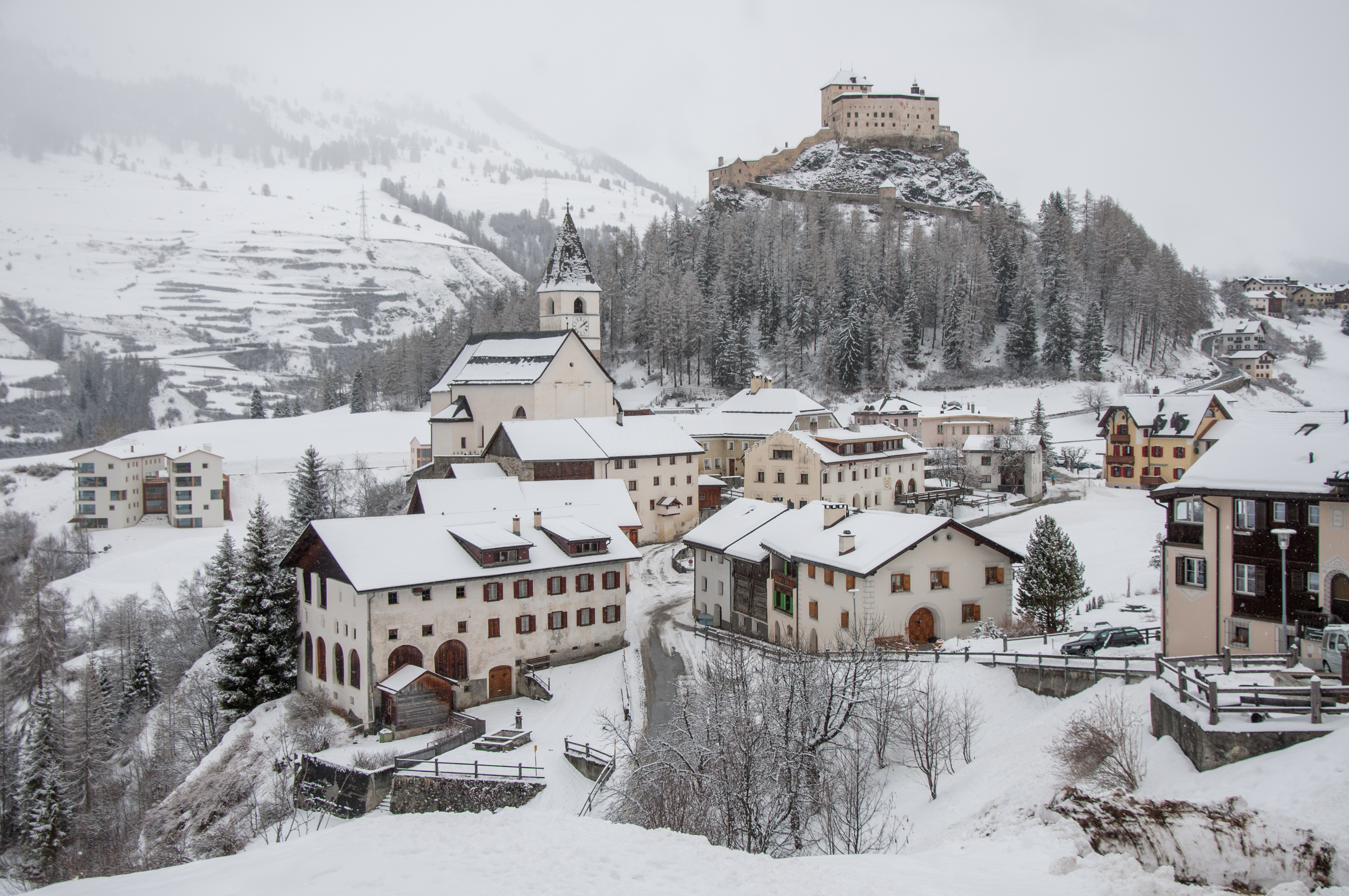
Tarasp Castle in winter

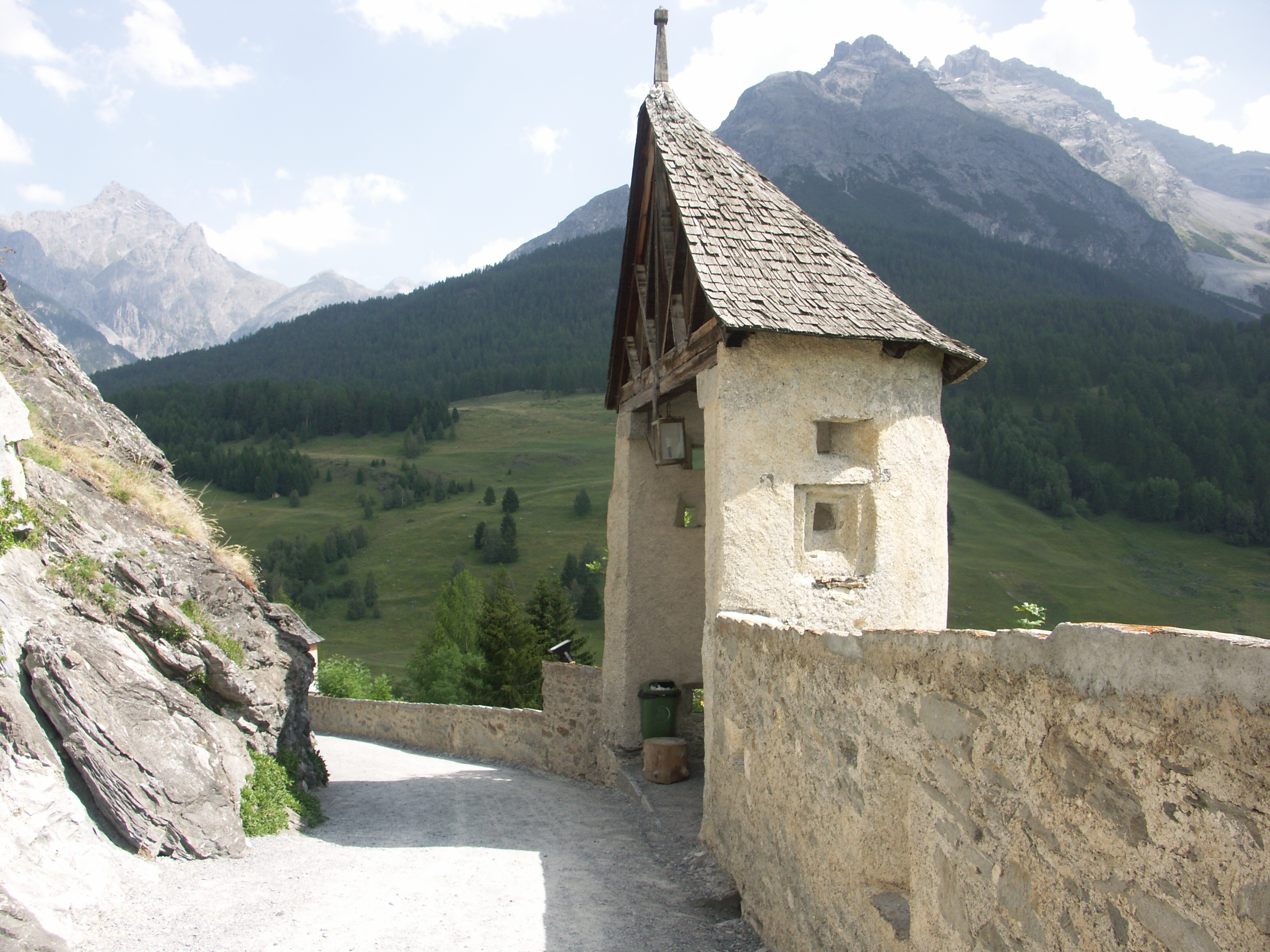
Half round tower

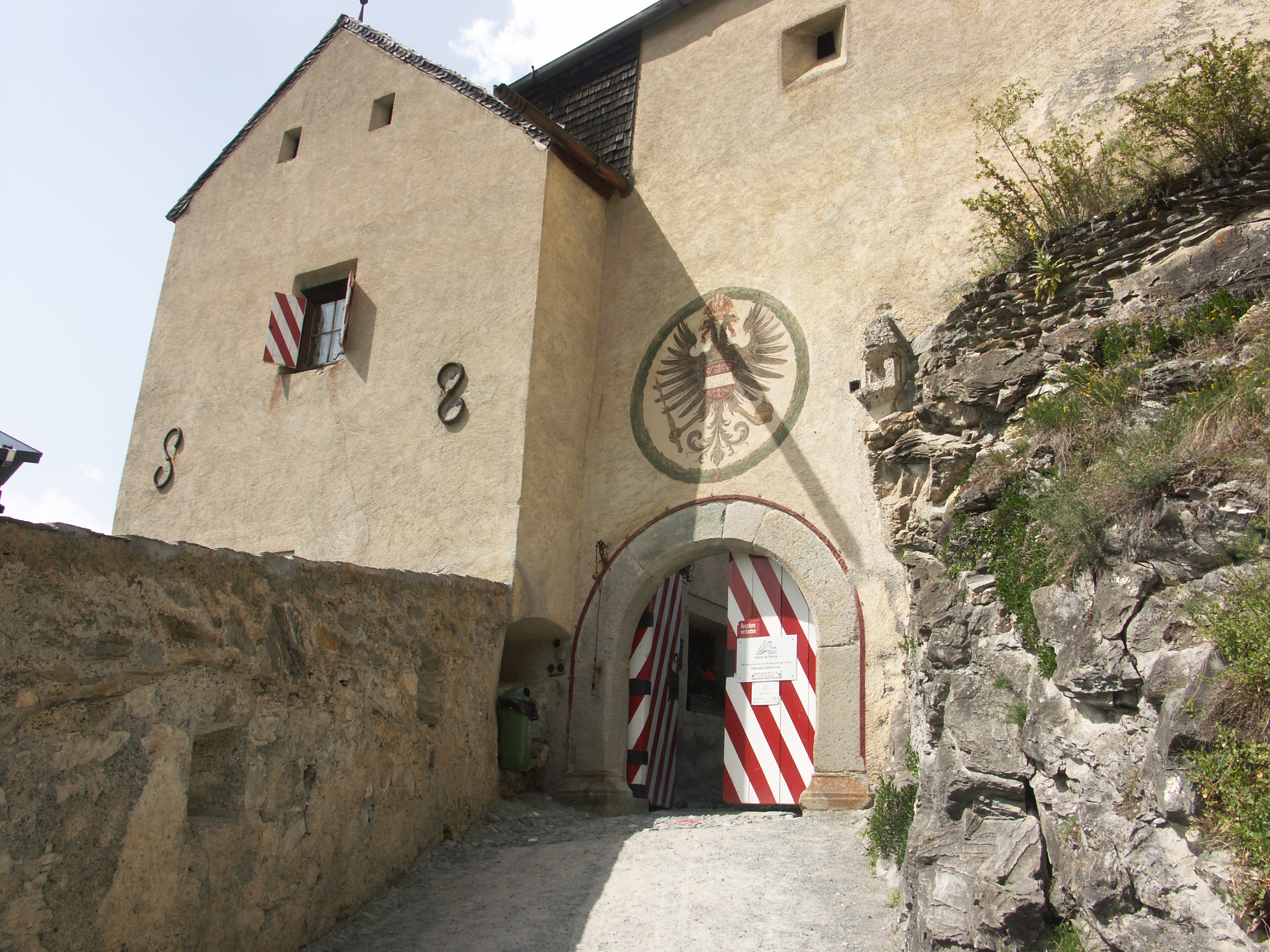
The Lower Gate

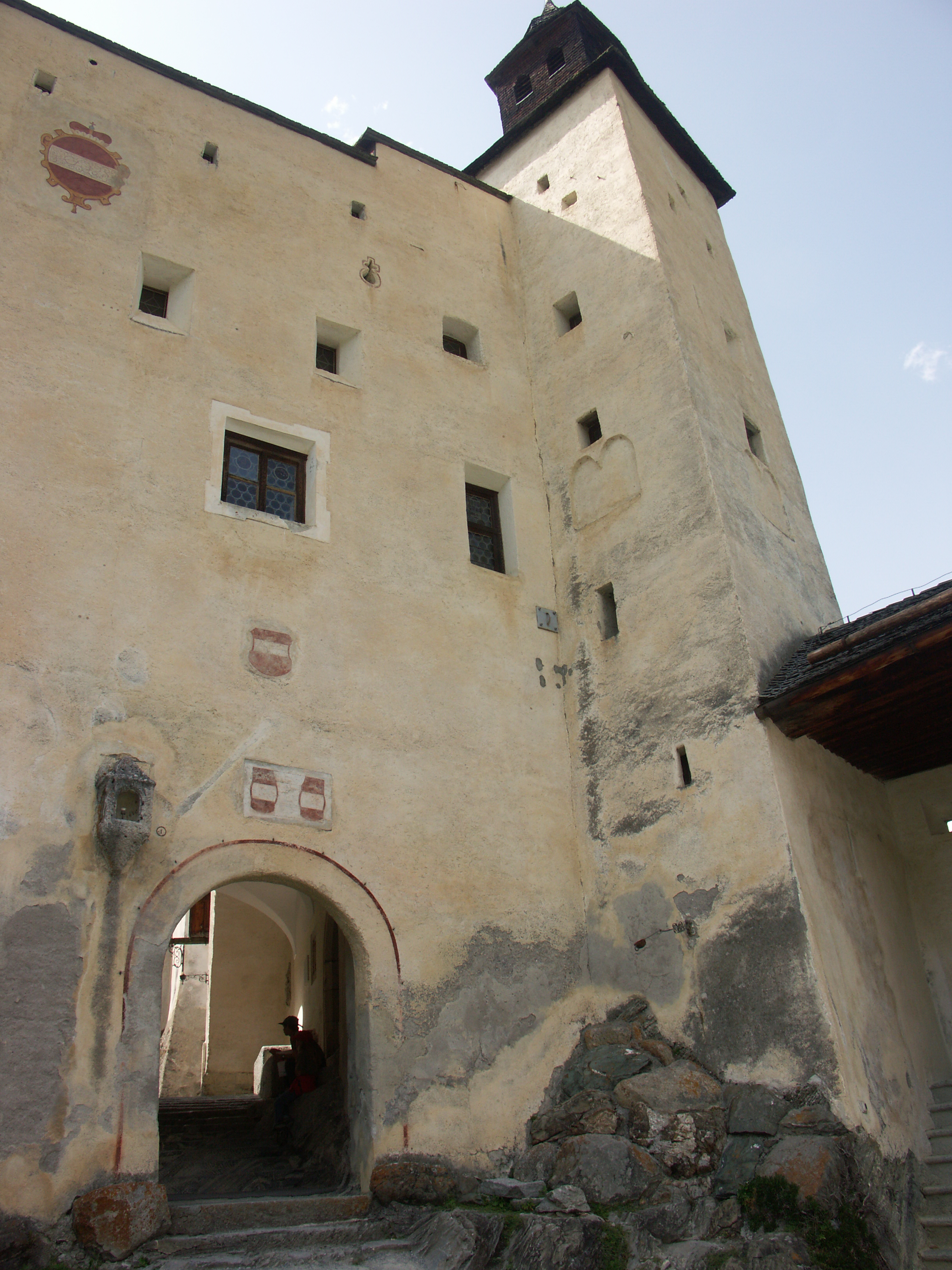
The Chapel Gate

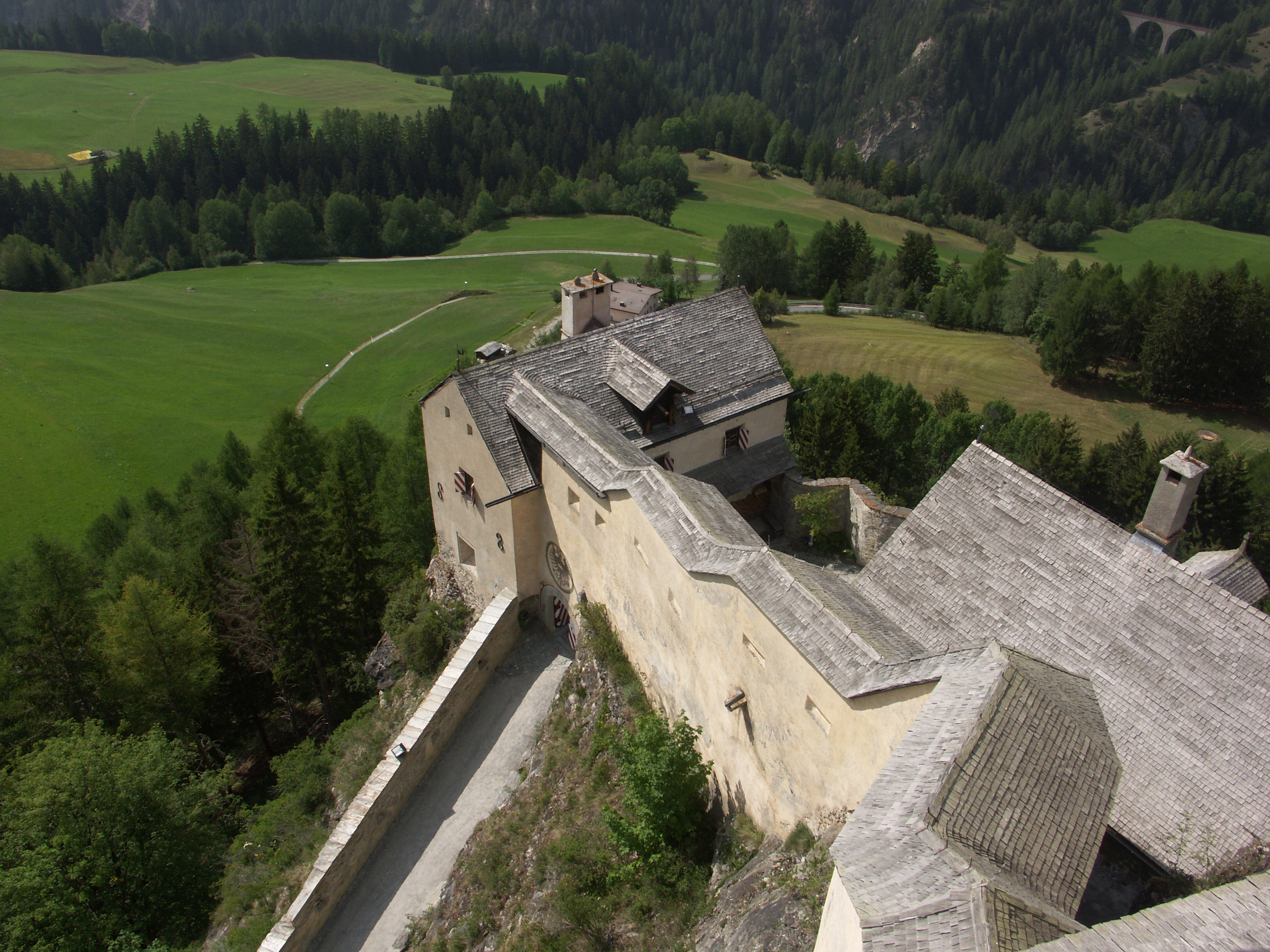
View down to the Lower Gate and Gatehouse

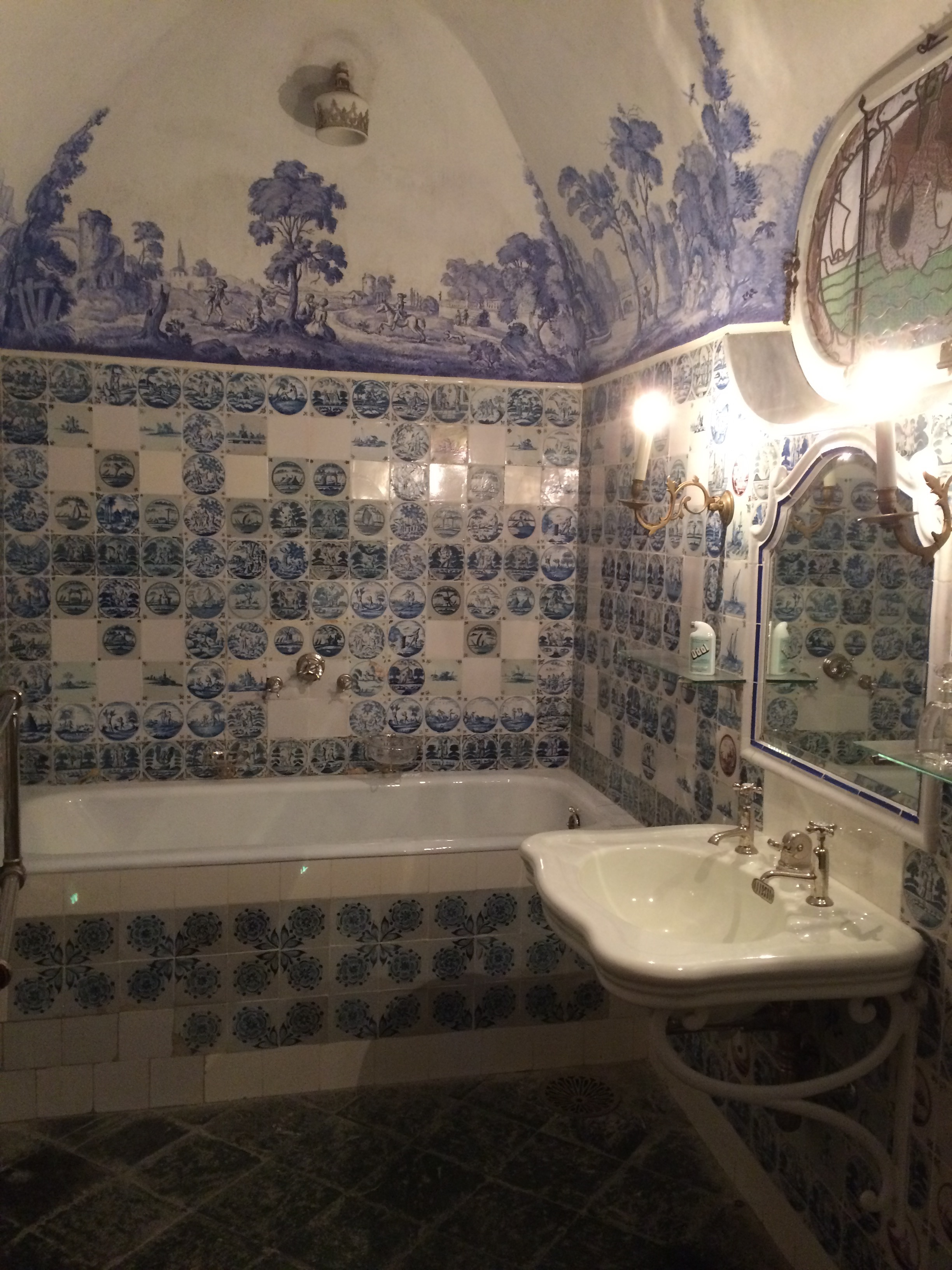
Bath installed by Karl Lingners

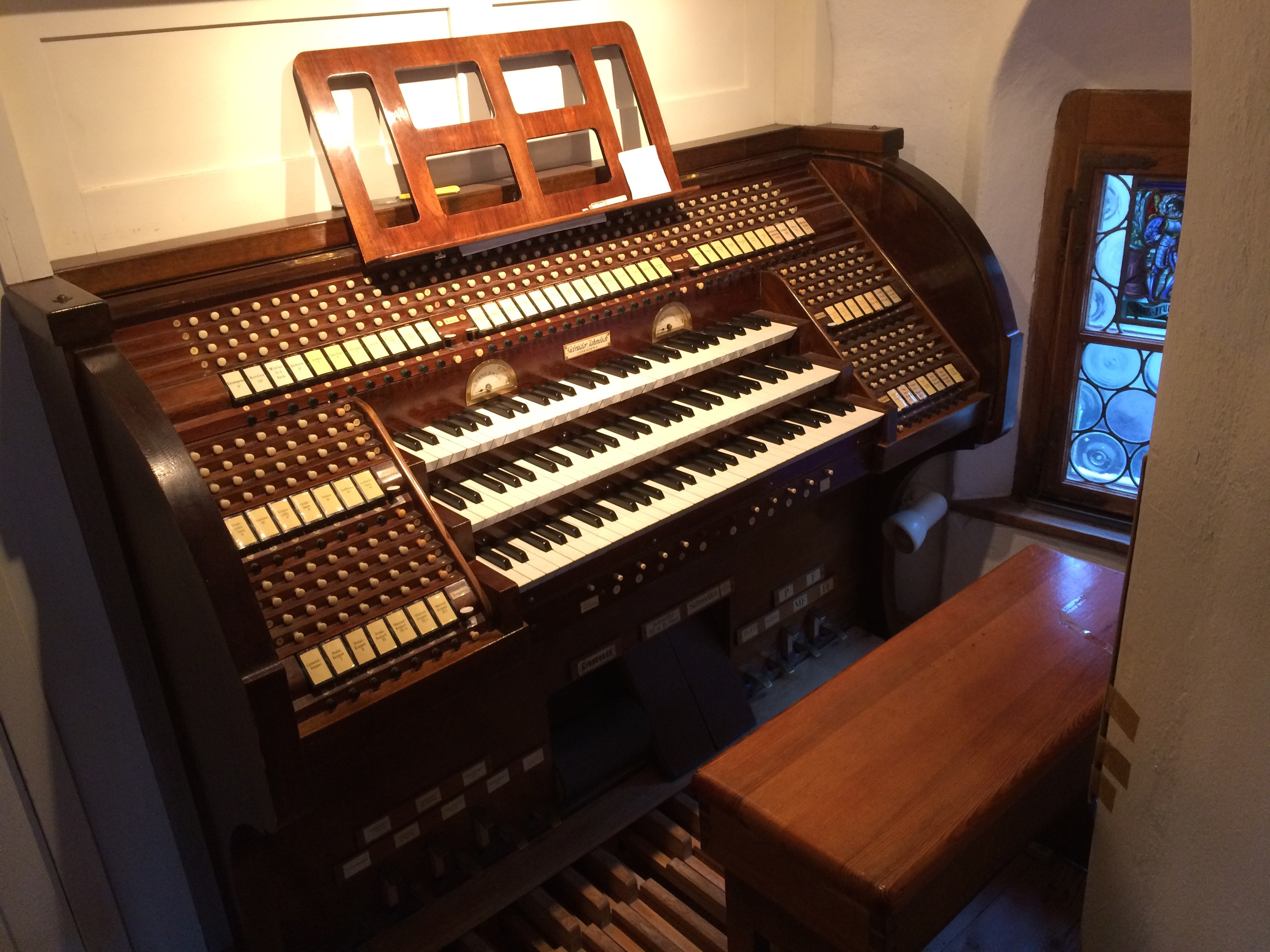
Organ installed by Karl Lingners

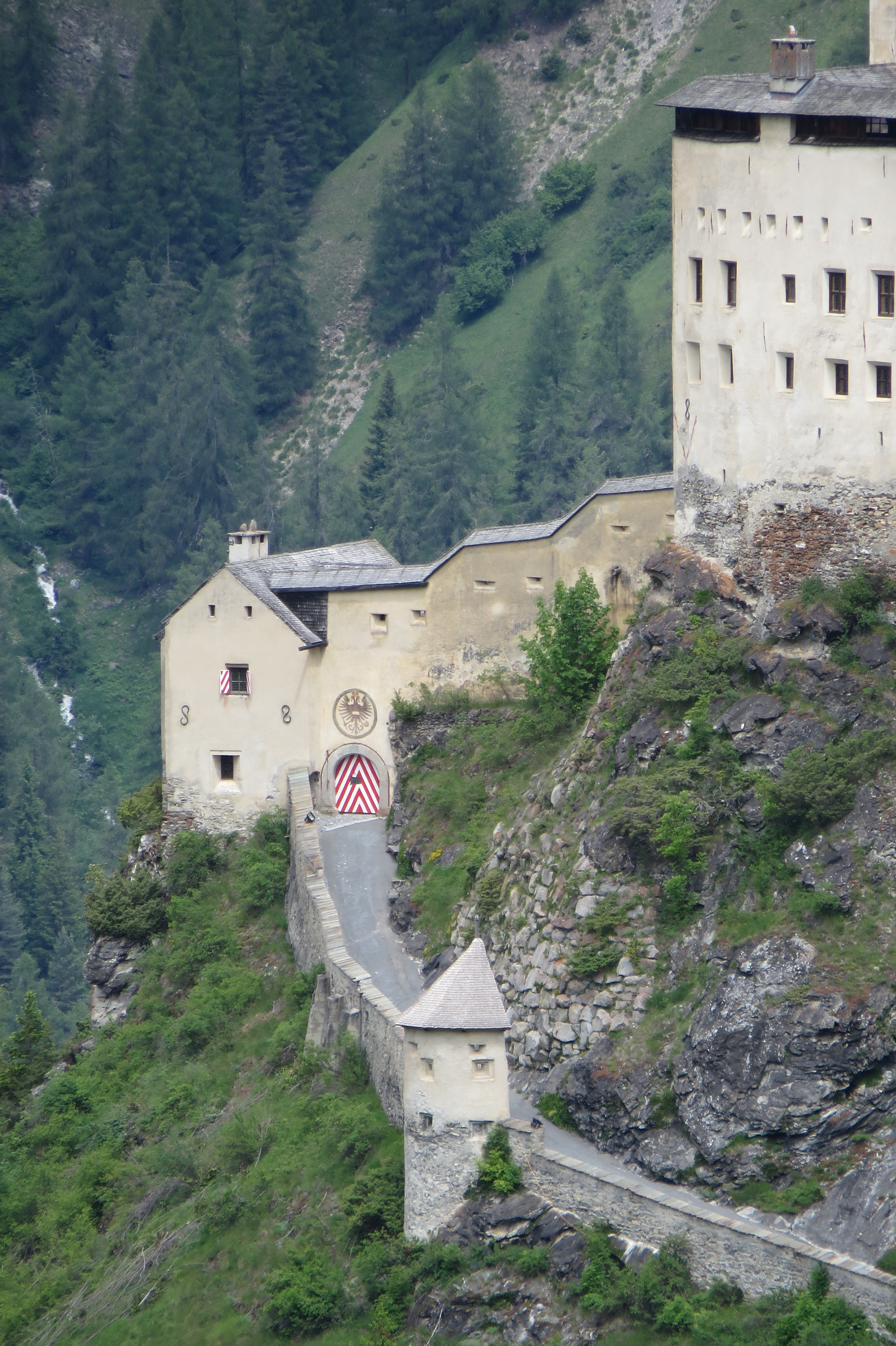
Outer wall and Lower Gate

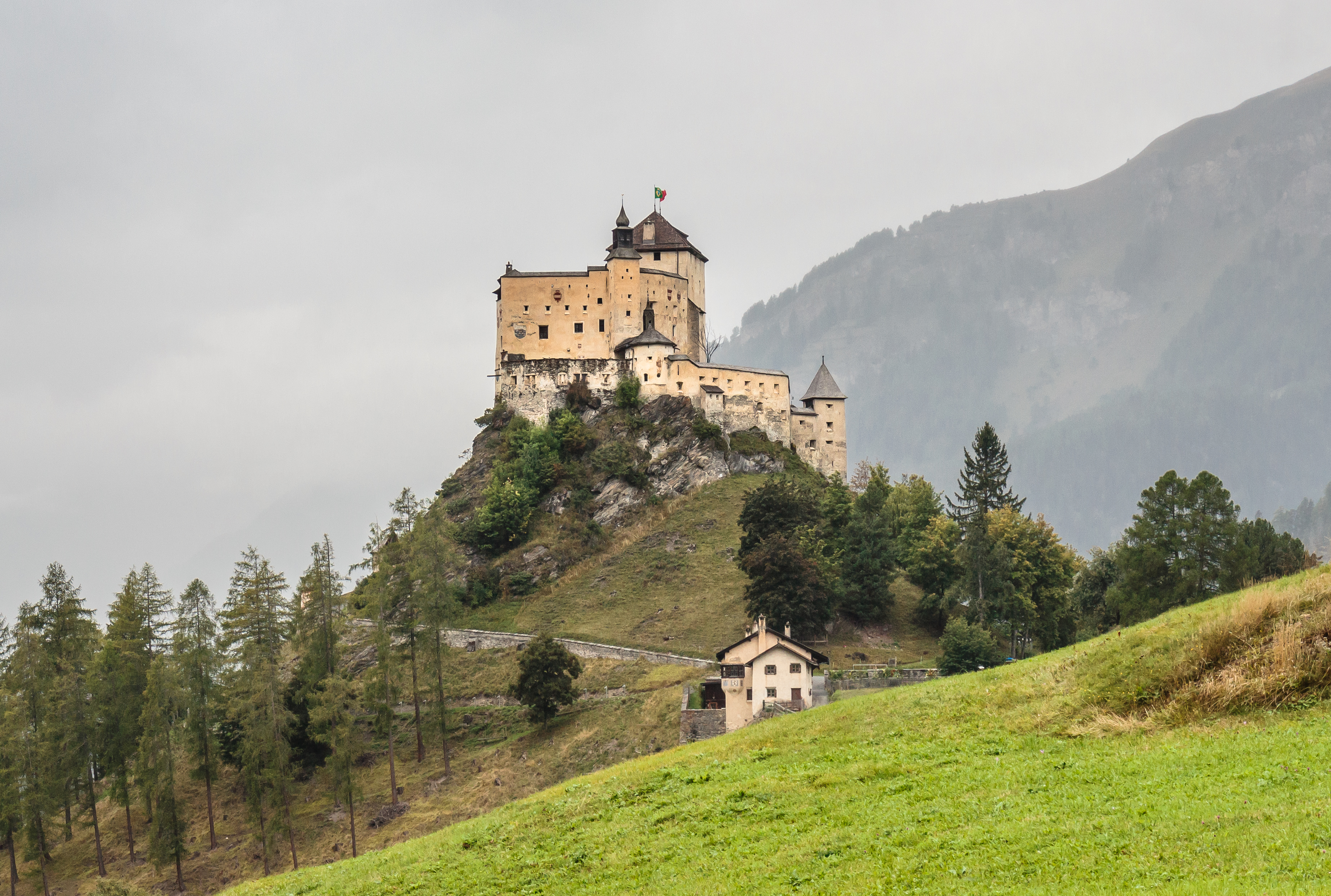
South side.

== Castle site ==
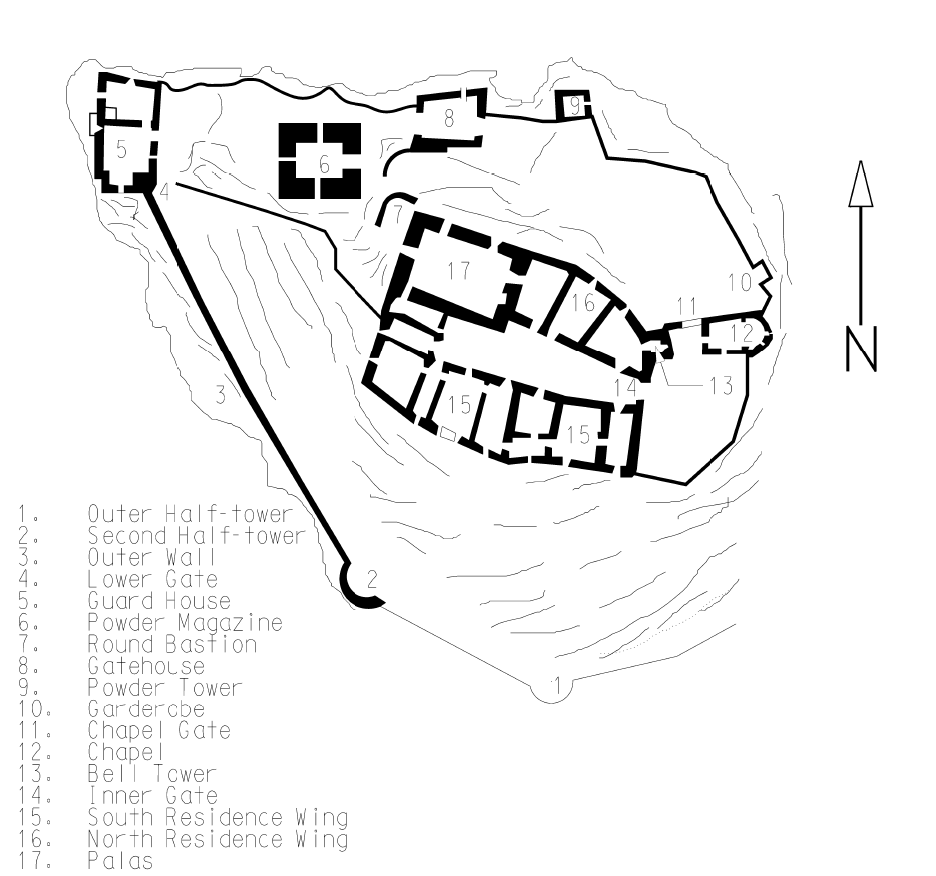
Plan of Tarasp Castle

The first fortifications on the site were a ring wall and part of the chapel and its bell tower. In the 13th century a large palas with 2 meters (6.6 ft) thick walls was built west of the chapel, becoming the center of the castle. The residential wings probably were also built in the 13th century. In the 16th and 17th centuries the castle was attacked several times and burned twice. The residence wings in particular were rebuilt and renovated several times during those centuries. The lower floors were given vaulted ceilings, new windows were cut through the rock walls and they were decorated in wood.

The chapel was integrated into the ring wall that surrounds the castle. The apse was decorated with 12th century paintings, of which only fragments remain. The interior was renovated in the 17th century. The free standing bell tower was probably built as a combination church tower and watch tower. It is five stories tall and crowned with a Baroque onion dome.

The zwinger (outer courtyard) and two half towers were probably built in the 16th century to protect the castle from attack.

The castle was renovated in 1714-15 and again in 1732.

The exterior walls are covered in white plaster and were decorated with coats of arms from the late 15th century. These paintings were still visible in 1900 but have since faded. However, a few were restored in recent restoration projects.

When Dr. Karl Lingner bought the castle in 1900, he undertook a complete restoration of the castle under the guidance of Professor Rudolf Rahn. He placed a large organ, built by Jehmlich of Dresden, in the old armory. He purchased furniture from noble houses scattered throughout Graubünden and Tyrol to furnish the castle. However, he died unexpectedly on 5 June 1916 without ever living in the castle.

== See also ==
- List of castles in Switzerland
