= Passes of the Silvretta and Rätikon Ranges =

Mountain passes of the Alps

The chief passes of the Silvretta and Rhatikon Ranges, from the Fuela Pass to the Reschen Scheideck and the Arlberg Pass, are:

Note: road status as of 1911.

Mountain pass	location	type (as of 1911)	Elevation	
Mountain pass	location	type (as of 1911)	m	ft
Jamjoch	Guarda to Galtur	Snow	3,082	939
Fuorcla del Confin	Silvretta Pass to the Vermunt Glacier	Snow	3,058	10,033
Buinlucke	Guarda to Patenen	Snow	3,054	10,020
Silvretta Pass	Klosters to Lavin	Snow	3,013	9,885
Zahnlucke	Jam Glen to the Fimber Glen	Snow	2,960	9,711
Verstanklathor	Klosters to Lavin	Snow	2,951	9,682
Fuorcla d'Urezzas	Ardez to Galtur	Snow	2,915	9,564
Fuorcla Tasna	Ardez to Ischgl	Snow	2,857	9,373
Fuorcla Maisas	Remus to the Samnaun Glen	Snow	2,852	9,357
Vermunt or Fermunt Pass	Guarda to Patenen	Snow	2,802	9,193
Futschol Pass	Ardez to Galtur	Footpath	2,773	9,098
Fuorcla Zadrell or Vernela Pass	Klosters to Lavin	Snow	2,753	9,032
Cuolm d'Alp bella or Vignitz Pass	Samnaun Glen to Kappl	Footpath	2,698	8,852
Schafbucheljoch	Mathon to St Anton	Footpath	2,647	8,684
Fimber Pass	Remus to Ischgl	Bridle path	2,612	8,570
Scheien Pass	Klosters to the See Glen	Footpath	2,608	8,556
Vereina Pass or Pass da Val Torta	Klosters to Lavin	Footpath	2,603	8,540
Zebles Pass	Ischgl to the Samnaun Glen	Bridle path	2,545	8,350
Garnerajoch	Klosters to Gaschurn	Footpath	2,485	8,153
Fless Pass	Klosters to Sus	Footpath	2,452	8,045
St Antonien or Gargellenjoch	St Antonien to St Gallenkirch	Footpath	2,375	7,792
Drusenthor	Schiers to Schruns	Footpath	2,350	7,710
Verrajochl	Luenersee to the Schweizerthor	Footpath	2,331	7,648
Ofen Pass	Schweizerthor to Schruns	Footpath	2,293	7,523
Cavelljoch	Bludenz and the Luenersee to Seewis	Footpath (Rätikon)	2,238	7,343
Gruben Pass	St Antoenien to Schruns	Footpath	2,235	7,333
Schlappinerjoch	Klosters to St Gallenkirch	Bridle path	2,200	7,218
Schweizerthor	Schiers to Schruns	Footpath (Rätikon)	2,151	7,057
Bielerhohe	Partenen to Galtuer	Bridle path	2,021	6,631
Zeinisjoch	Partenen to Galtuer	Bridle path	1,852	6,076
Arlberg Pass	Landeck to Bludenz	Carriage road over Railway tunnel beneath	1,802	5,912

== See also ==
- List of highest paved roads in Europe
- List of mountain passes
