= Steinsberg Castle (Graubünden) =

Ruined castle in Switzerland

- Ruine Steinsberg, Chasté
- Ardez
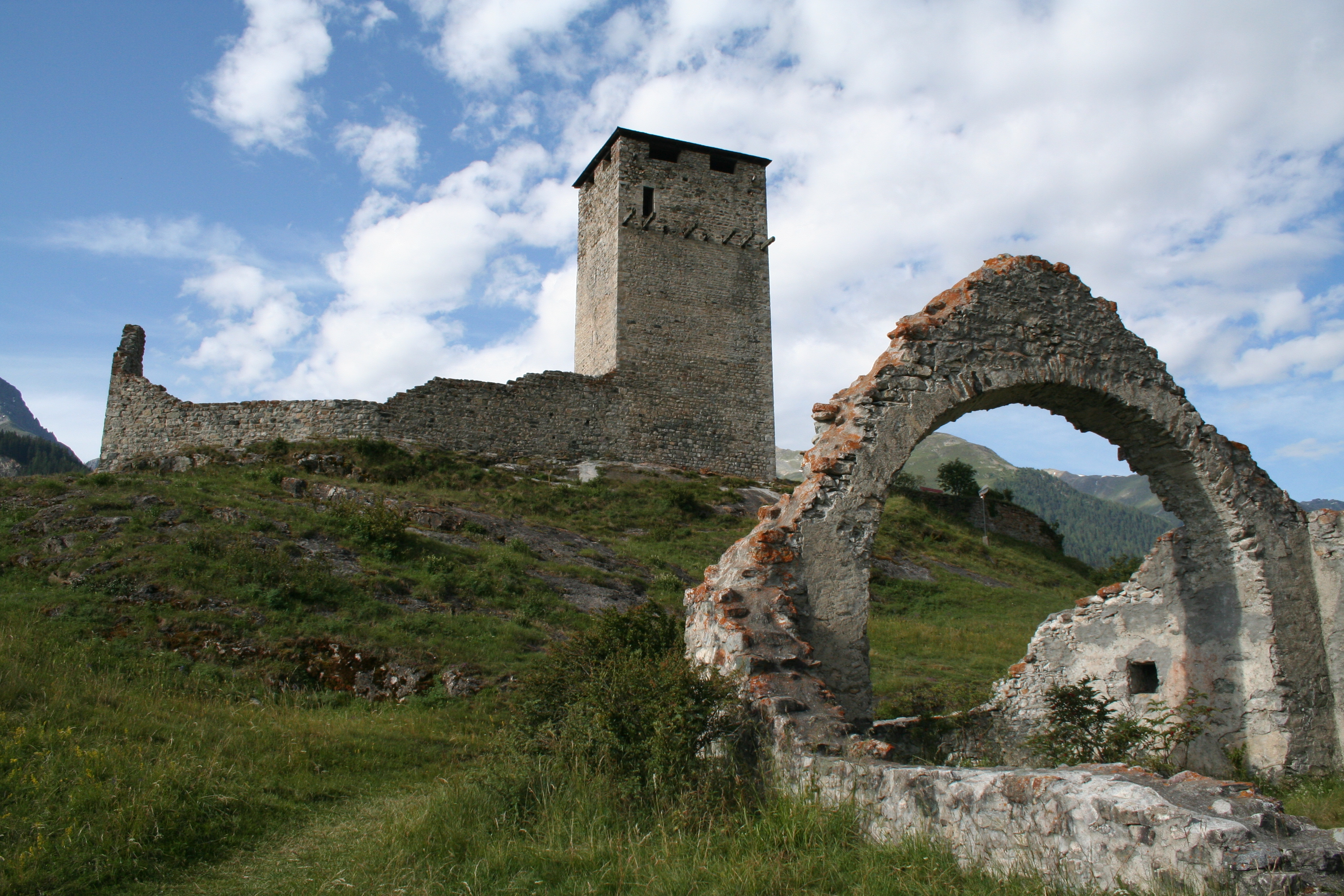
- Steinsberg from the east

Site information
- Type: hill castle
- Code: CH-GR
- Condition: ruin

Location
- Location within Canton of Graubünden Location within Switzerland
- Coordinates: 46°46′27.40″N 10°12′18″E
- Height: 1,521 m above the sea

Site history
- Built: 12th Century

Steinsberg Castle is a ruined castle in the former municipality of Ardez (now Scuol) of the Canton of Graubünden in Switzerland. It is a Swiss heritage site of national significance.

== History ==
During the High Middle Ages a fortified church with a ring wall and perhaps a tower was built near the current castle. By the end of the 12th century, these fortifications were demolished and a new castle was built above formerly fortified plateau and the Church of St. Lazius. It was probably built for a local noble family. In 1209 Albert von Frickingen sold all his estates and villages as well as the castle above Ardez to the Bishop of Chur. Count Albert von Tirol also had a claim on the lands, but in 1228 relinquished his claim to the Bishop of Chur. The castle became the center of the ecclesiastical estates in the area. In 1348 the Bishop pledged the castle and lands to the Planta family for a loan of 150 Marks. In 1359, the Bishop again pledged the castle to the Lords of Katzenstein for 700 Gulden. In 1411 it was pledged to Georg Scheck. Despite attempts from the Bishop to regain ownership of the castle, the Scheck family retained it until 1502.

In 1499, during the Swabian War, the castle was captured by imperial troops on 25 March. They burned the castle and the current owner Balthasar Scheck was taken to Merano and executed. In 1502 the heavily damaged castle was pledged to Hans von Planta. He and his son spent the remainder of the 16th century trying to get the Bishop of Chur to pay interest owed on the loan. At some point during that century, they abandoned the ruined castle. As the Three Leagues grew in power, they repeatedly denied the Bishop the right to appoint a vogt over Steinsberg. The nearby church was abandoned during the Protestant Reformation. In 1861 Emanuel von Planta-Wildenberg purchased the ruins and surrounding lands from the Bishop for 1000 Gulden. The ruins were repaired in 1964 and 1985.

== Castle site ==
The castle is located on a hill outside the village of Ardez. The top of the hill has about 100 by 100 meters (330 ft × 330 ft) of space for buildings with steep sides all around. The castle occupies the highest point on the hill. Its four-story keep was about 6.5 by 8.5 meters (21 ft × 28 ft) in size. The style of the stone work changes above the second story, indicating that it was either added later or repaired. The high entrance was to the south on the second floor. The upper stories have window seats from the 14th century and were either added then, or they were part of the new construction or repair. A residential wing was built east of the tower, against the ring wall. The castle was probably encircled by the ring wall, though only traces remain.

The ruins of the Romanesque church of St. Luzius are north of the castle. Unusually, the nave of this church runs north and south.

== Gallery ==
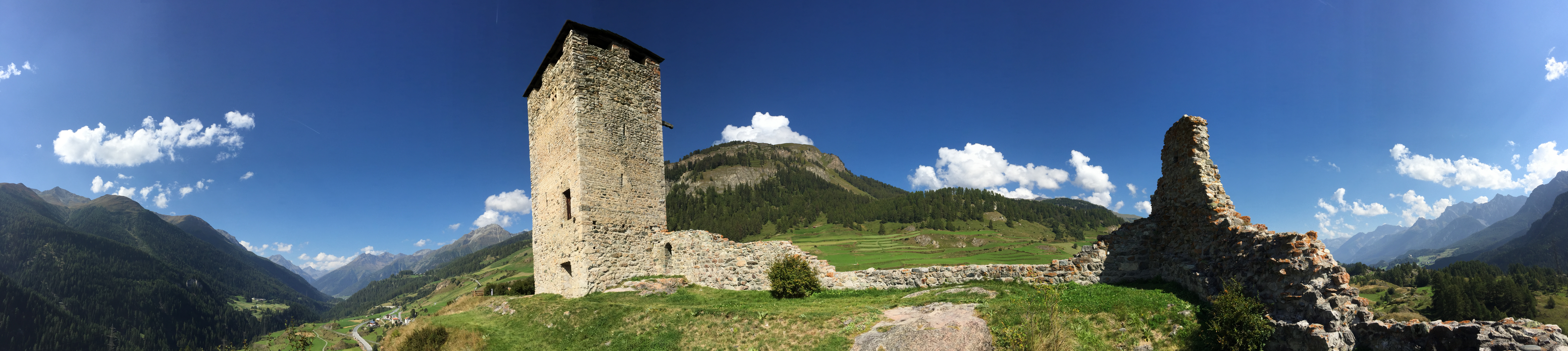
Panorama

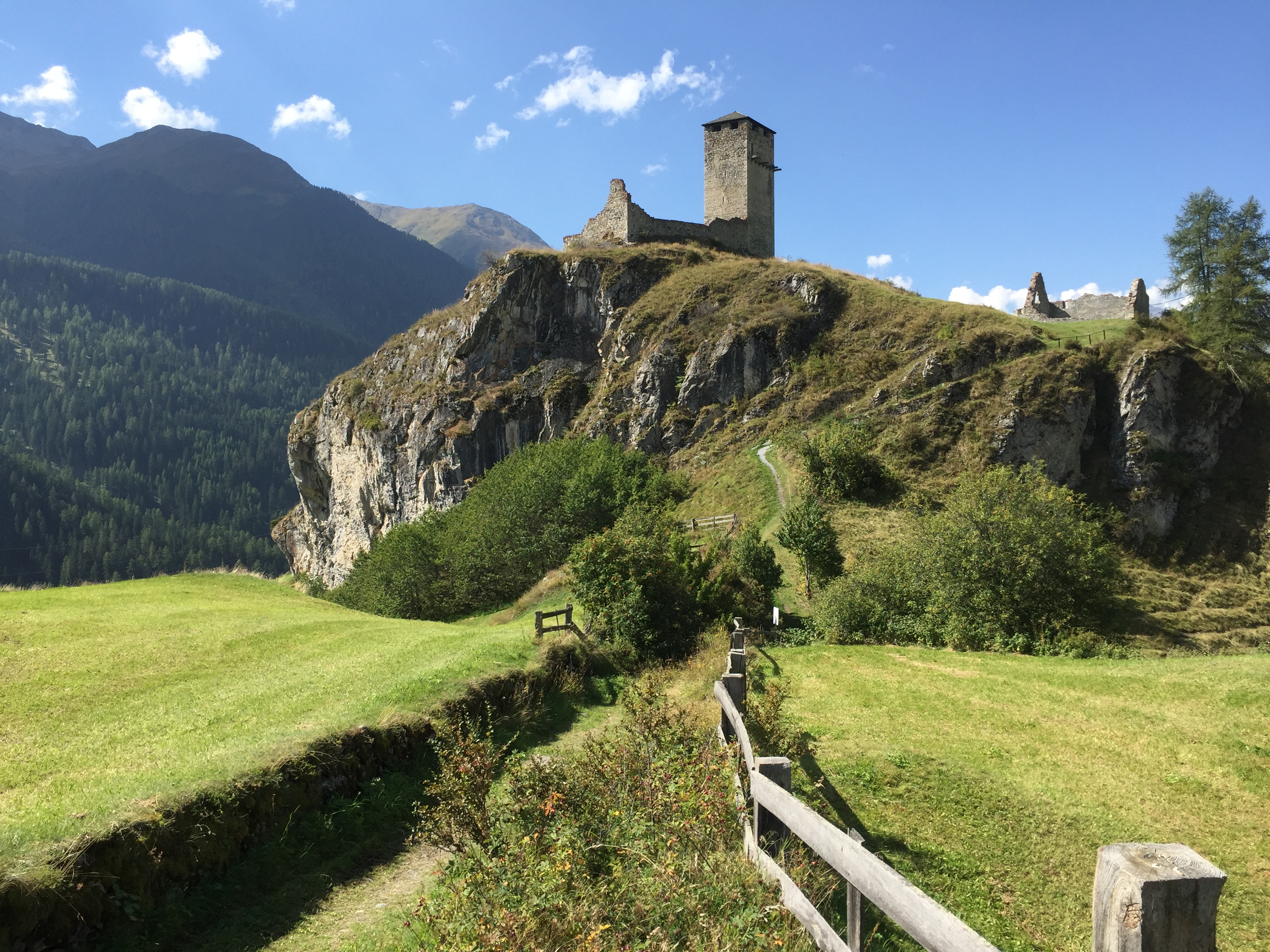
View from the east

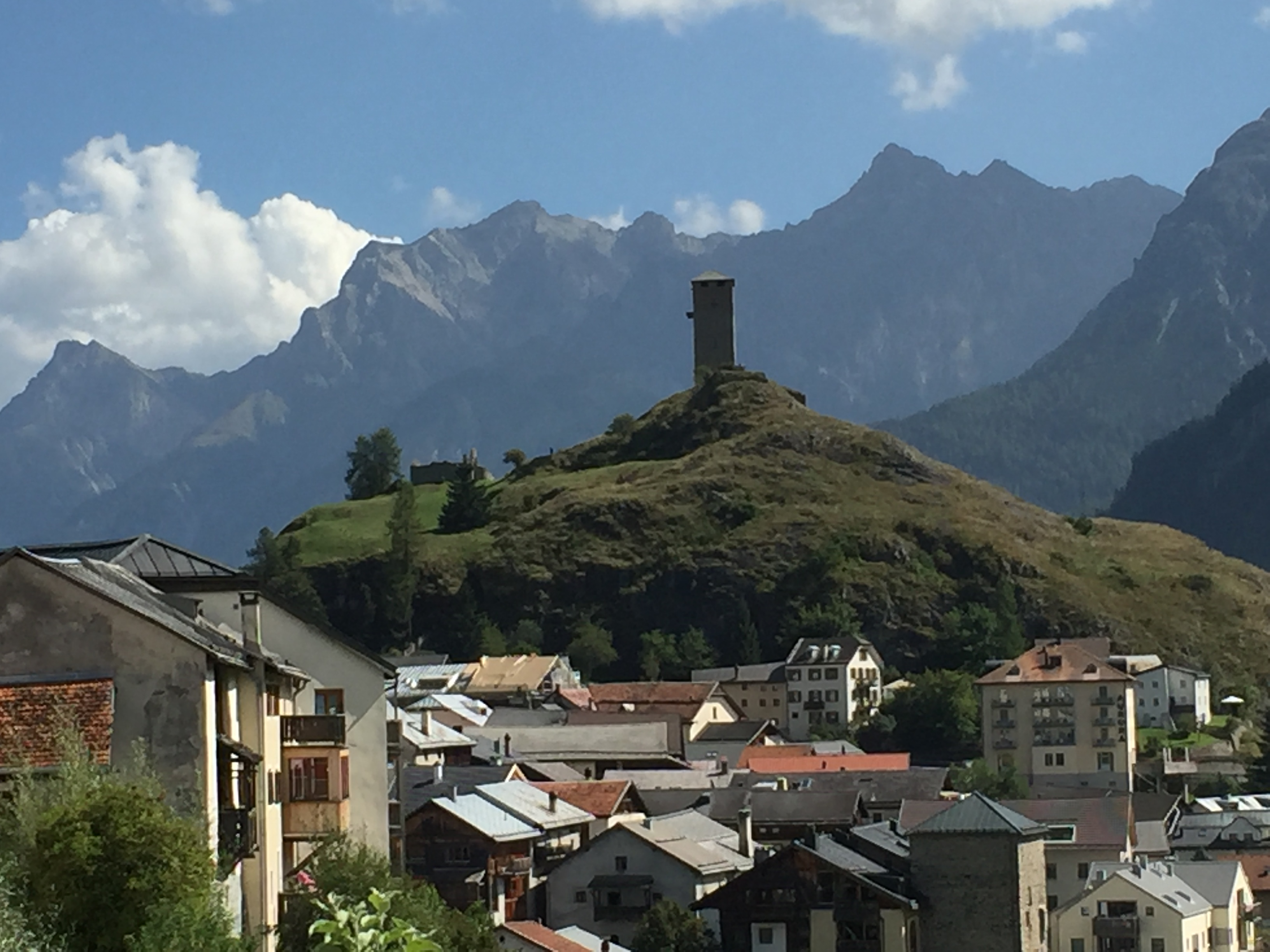
View from the west

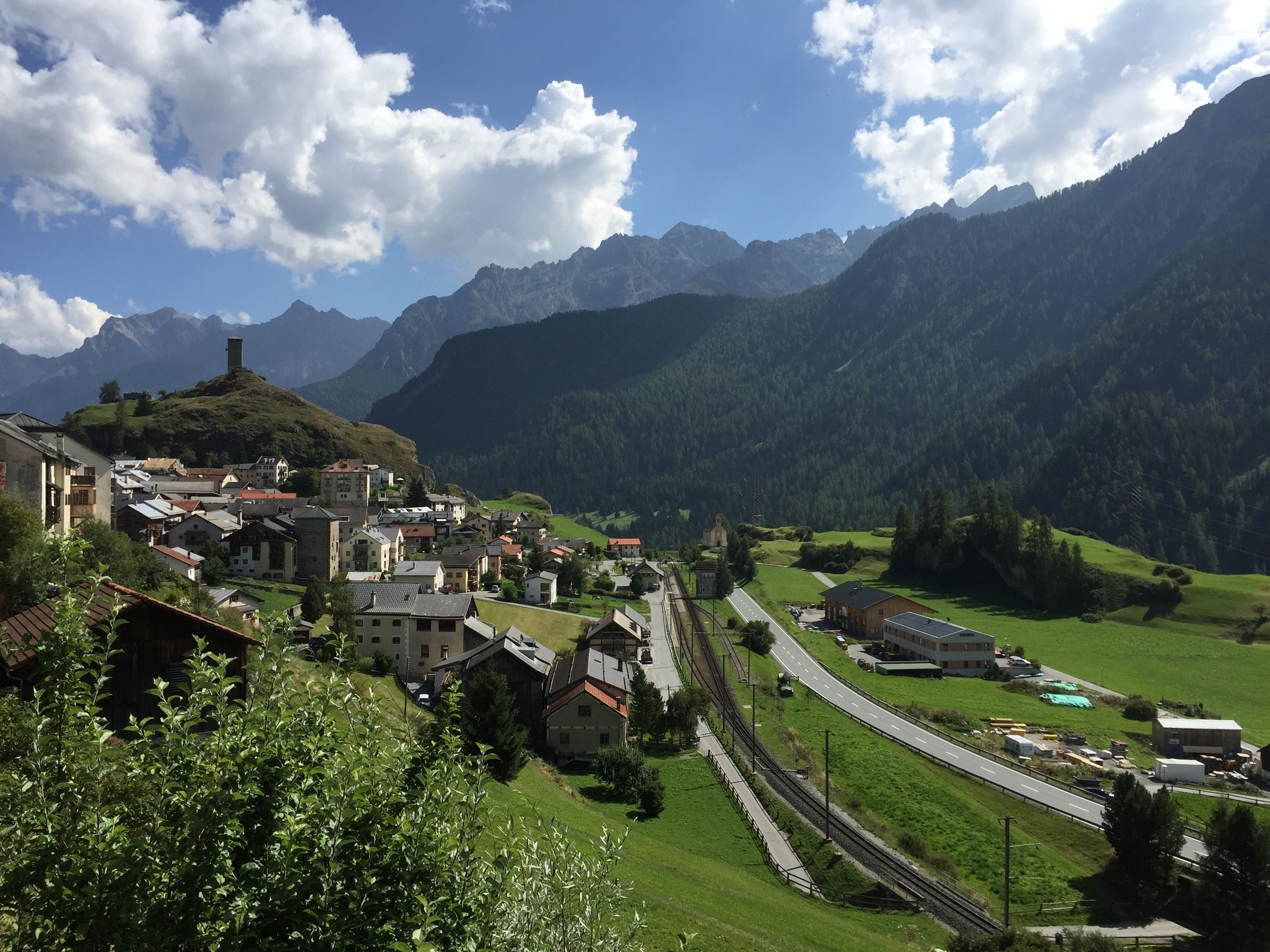
Ardez and the ruins of Steinsberg

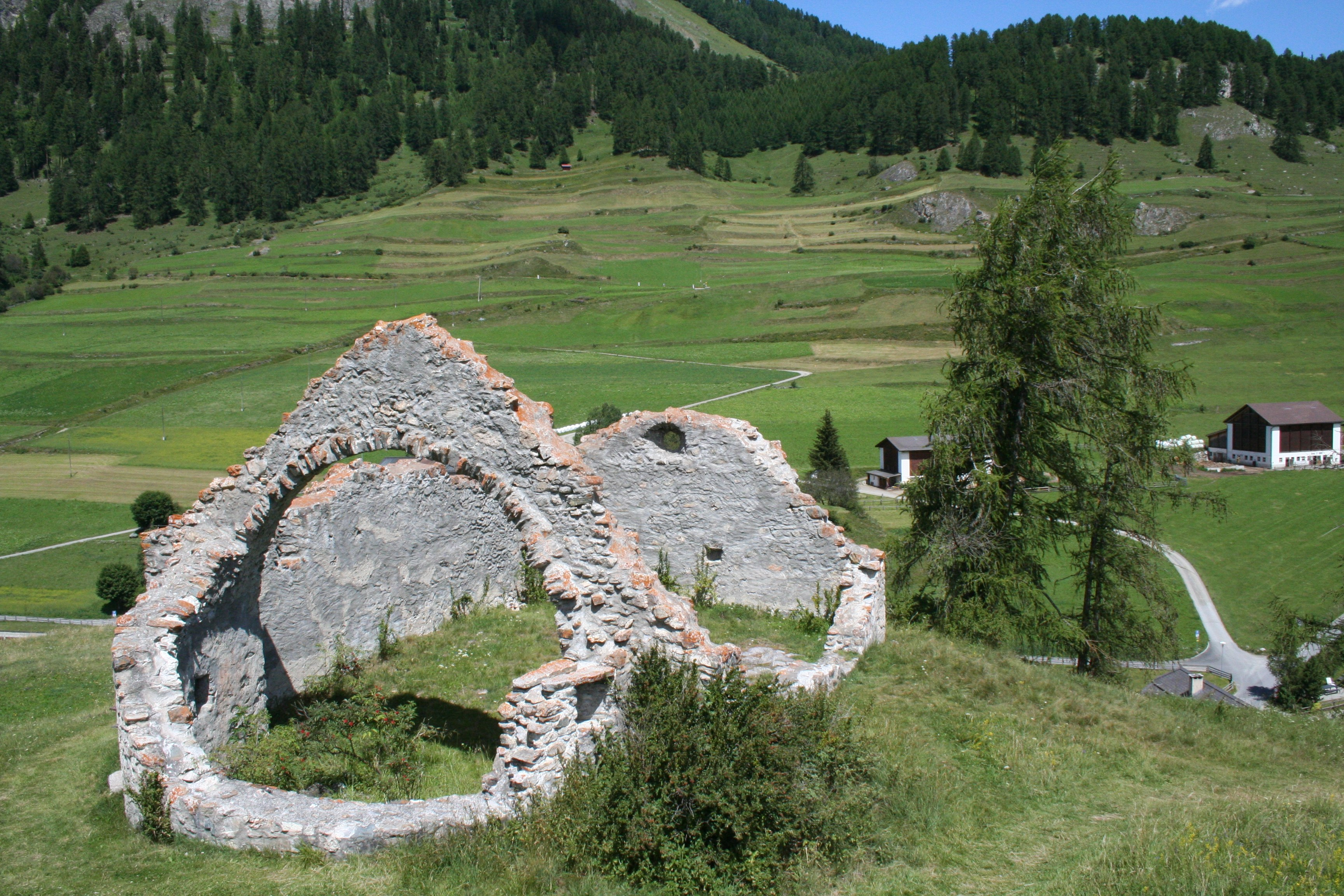
Church of St. Luzius

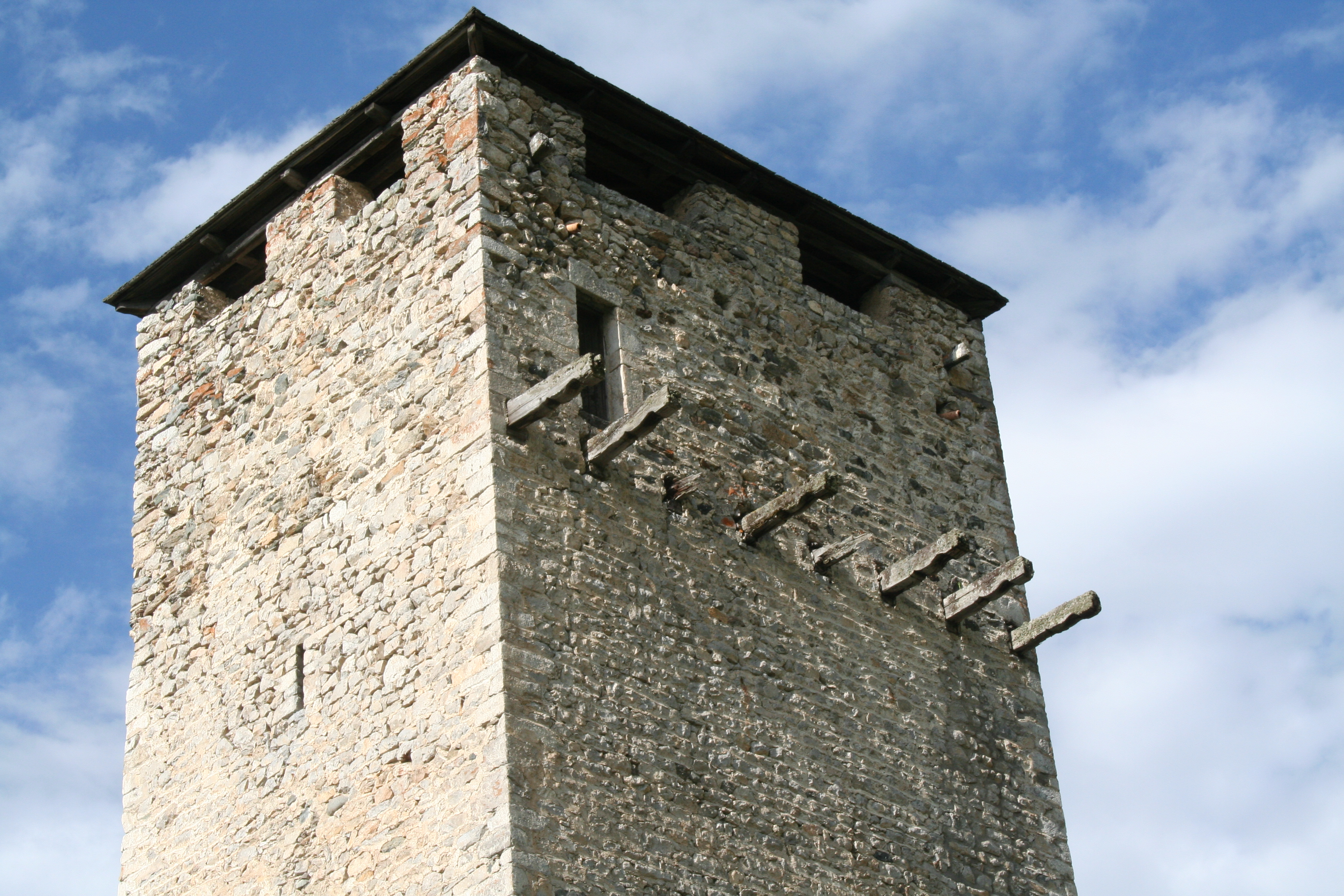
Supports for a balcony

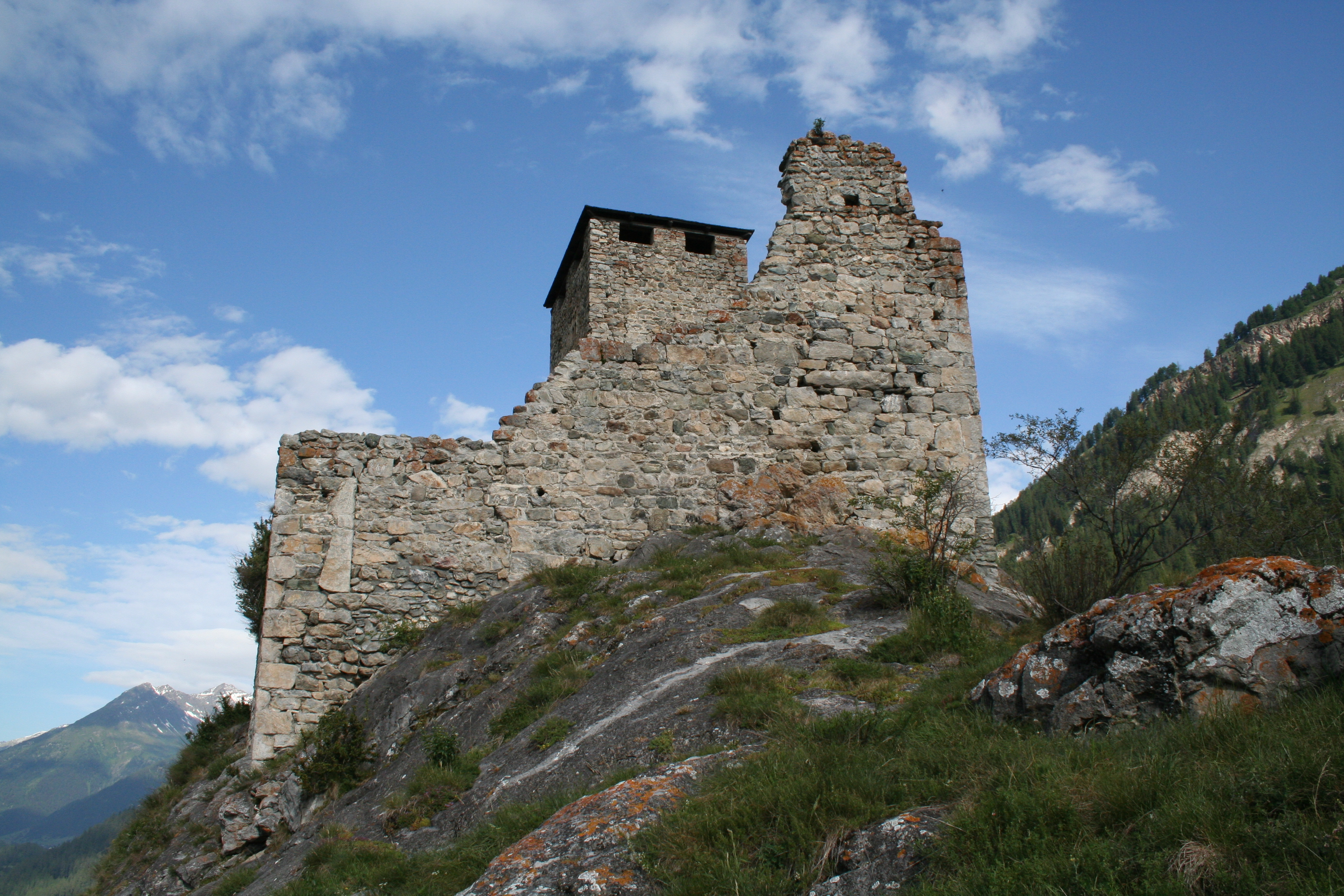
East wall

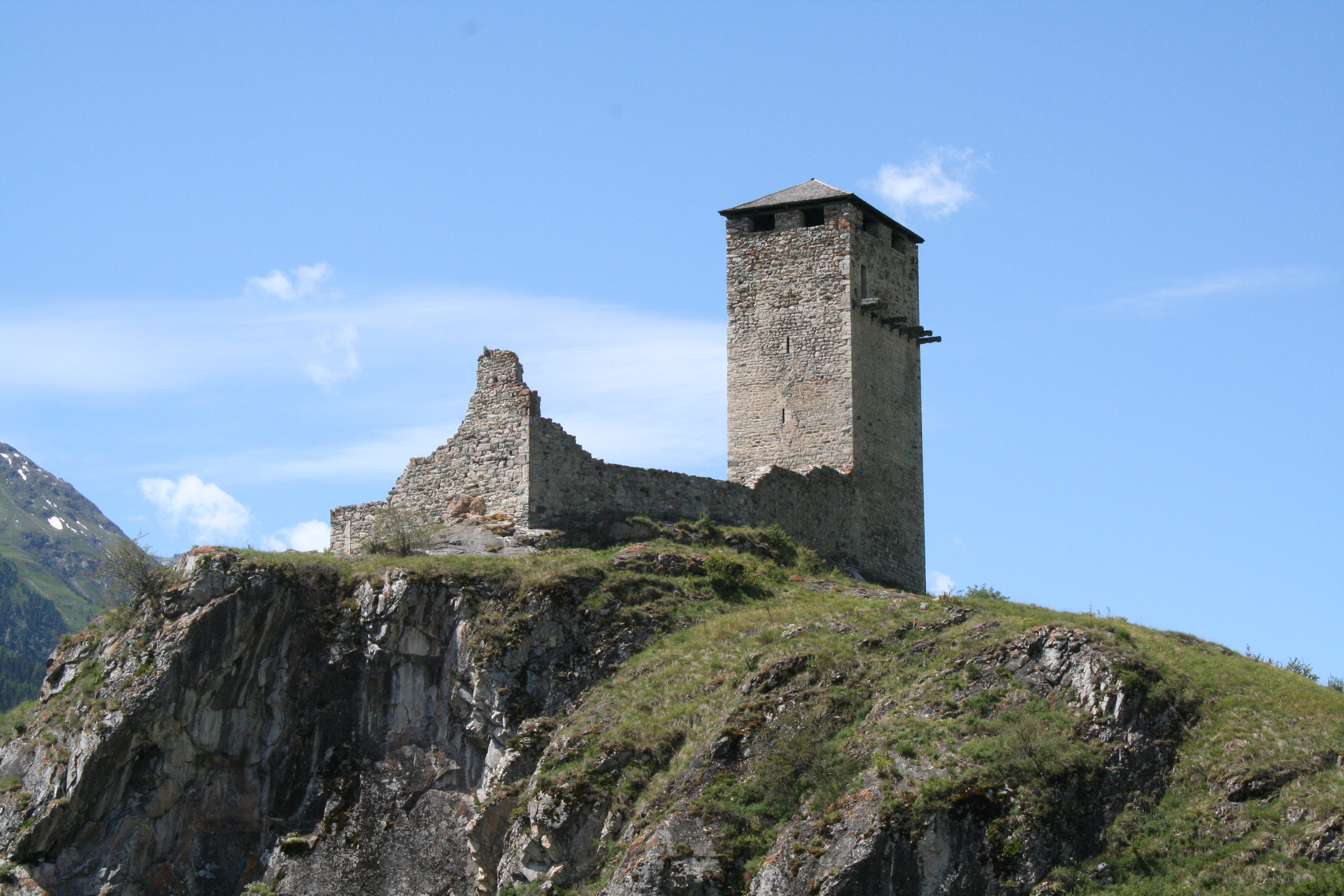
Steinsberg Castle

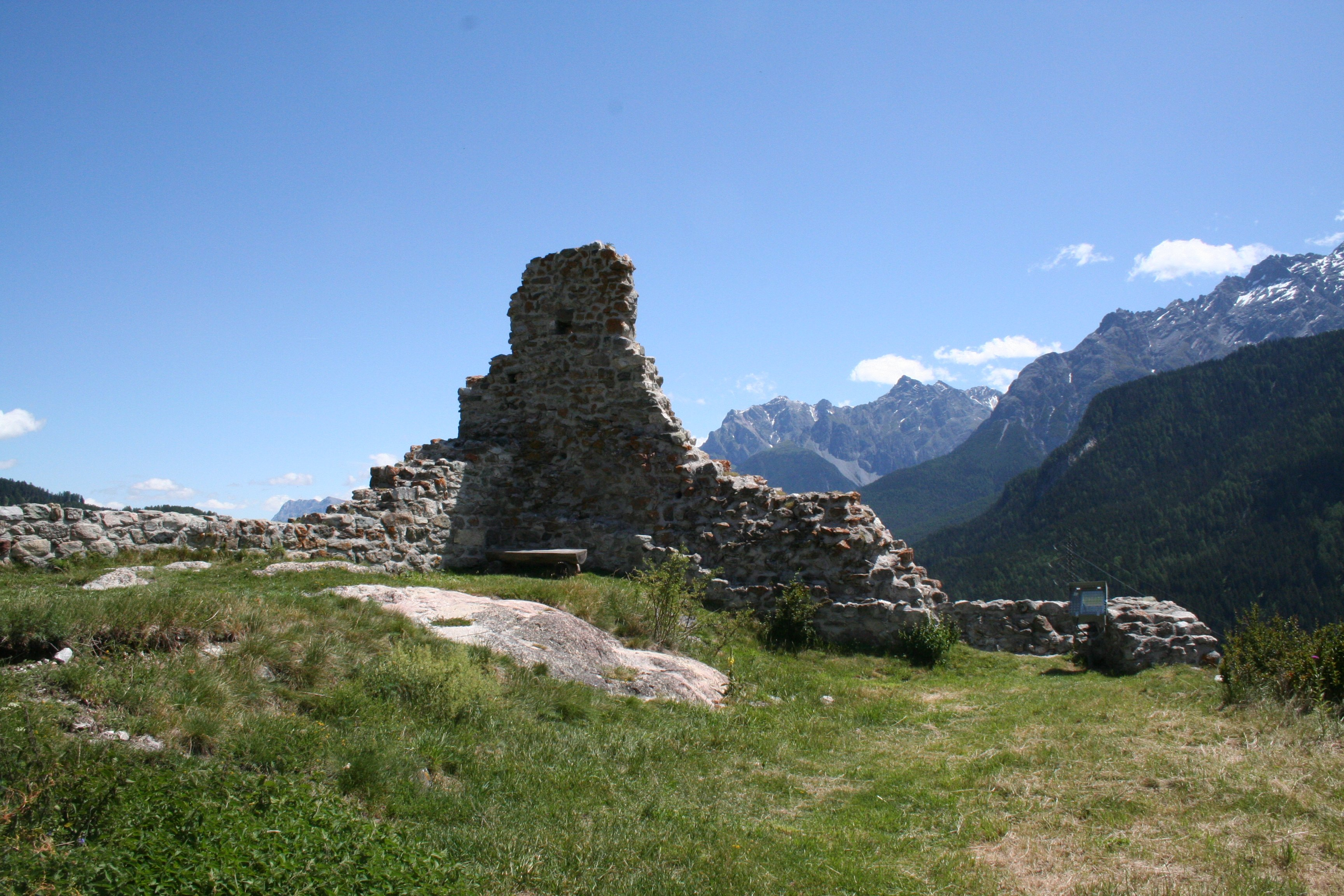
View toward the east

== See also ==
- List of castles in Switzerland
