= Sent, Switzerland =

Sent
- Former municipality
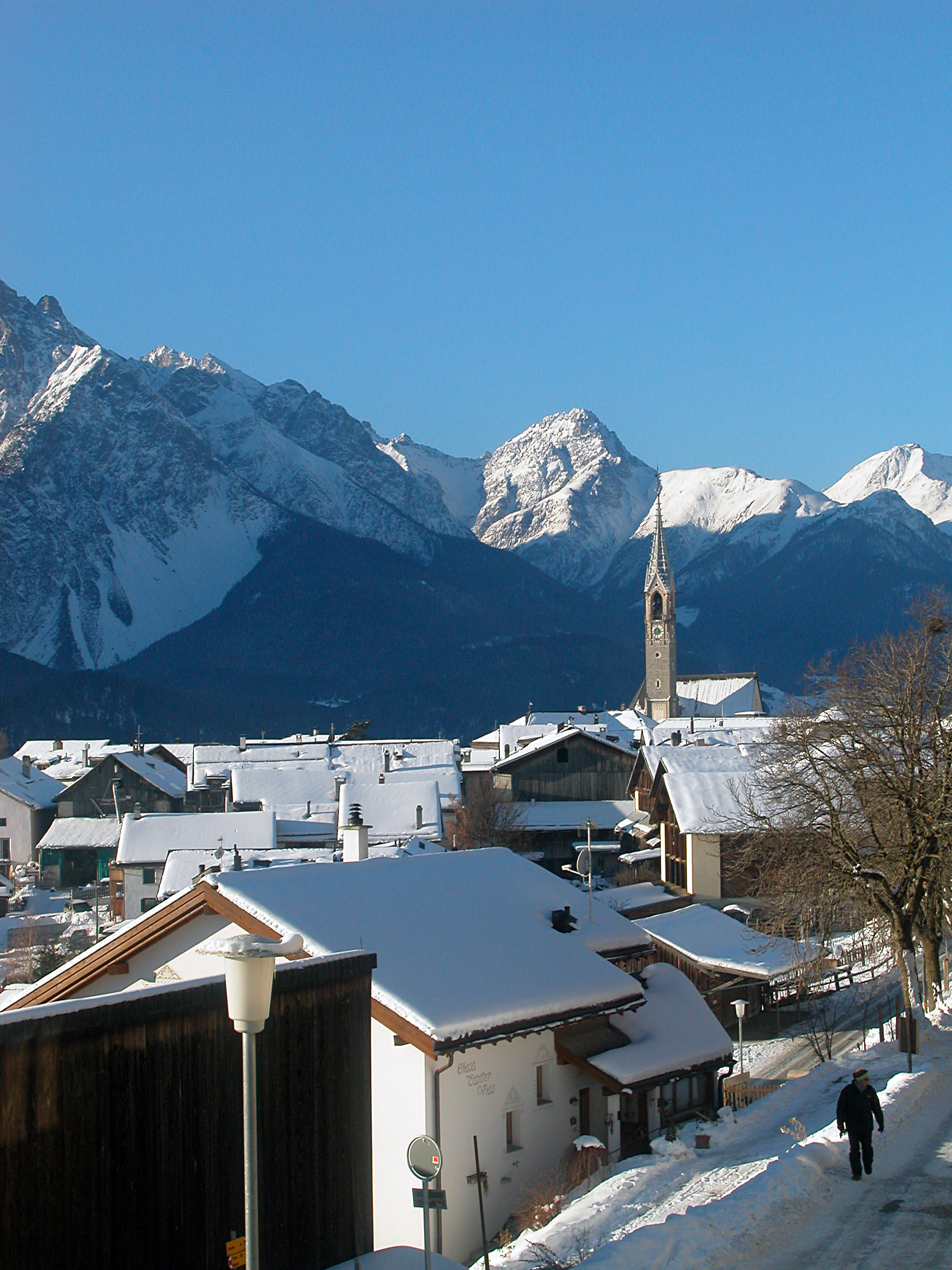

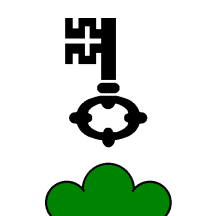
- Flag Coat of arms
- Location of Sent
- Location within Switzerland Location within Canton of Graubünden
- Coordinates: 46°49′N 10°20′E
- Country: Switzerland
- Canton: Graubünden
- District: Inn

Area
  - Total: 111.74 km^{2} (43.14 sq mi)
- Elevation: 1,440 m (4,720 ft)

Population (Dec 2014)
  - Total: 881
  - Density: 7.88/km^{2} (20.4/sq mi)
- Time zone: UTC+01:00 (CET)
  - Summer (DST): UTC+02:00 (CEST)
- Postal code: 7554
- SFOS number: 3763
- ISO 3166 code: CH-GR
- Surrounded by: Graun im Vinschgau (IT-BZ), Ftan, Ischgl (AT-7), Mals (IT-BZ), Ramosch, Scuol
- Website: www.sent-online.ch

Sent is a former municipality in the district of Inn in the Swiss Canton of Graubünden. On 1 January 2015 the former municipalities of Ardez, Guarda, Tarasp, Ftan and Sent merged into the municipality of Scuol.

== History ==
Sent is first mentioned in 930, when King Henry the Fowler sent the Ramosch priest Hartpert to the church in vicus Sindes. It is unclear whether he meant the Church of St. Peter or St. Lorenz. Until the end of the 19th century, it had the highest population of any village in the Engadin.

== Geography ==
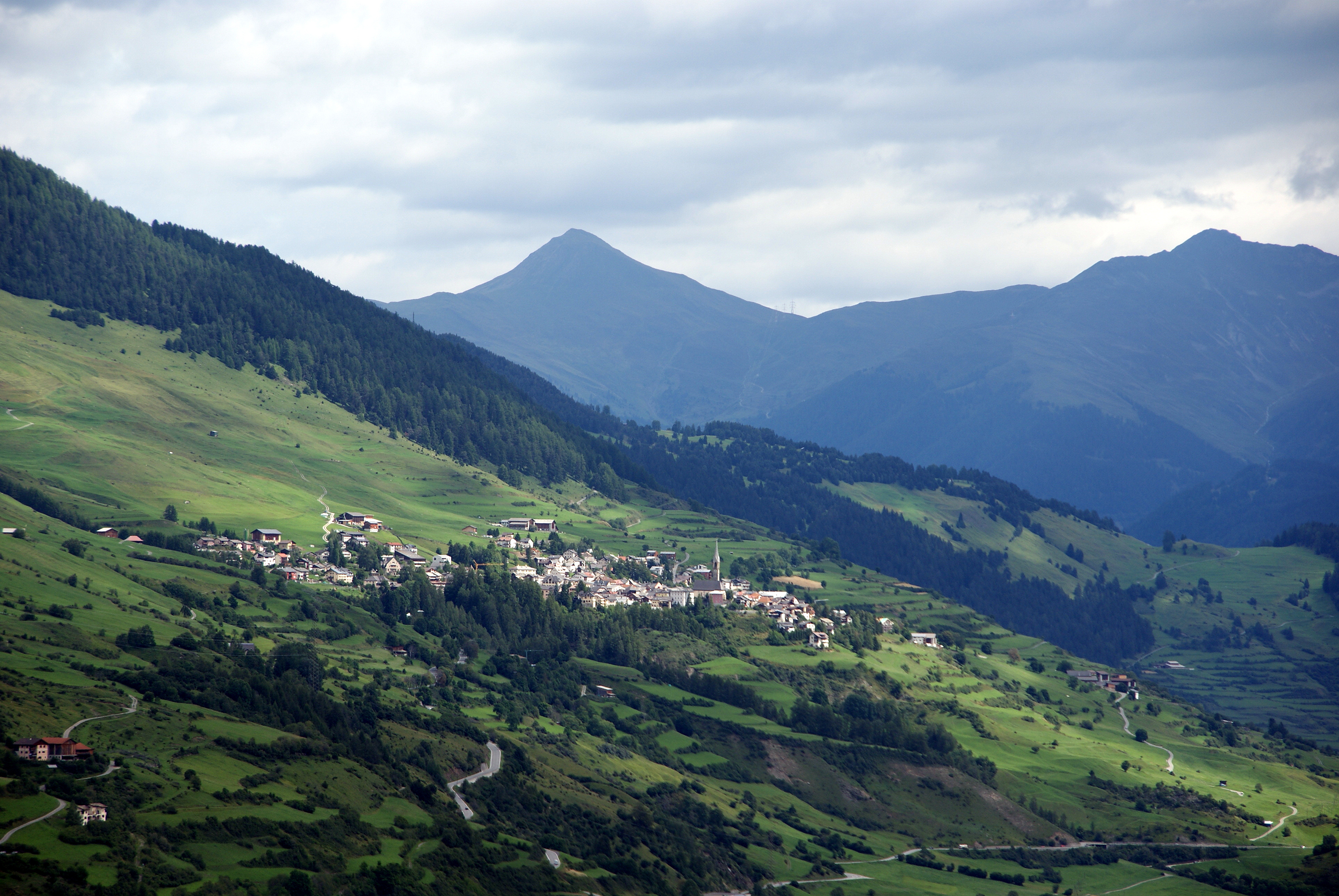
Village of Sent

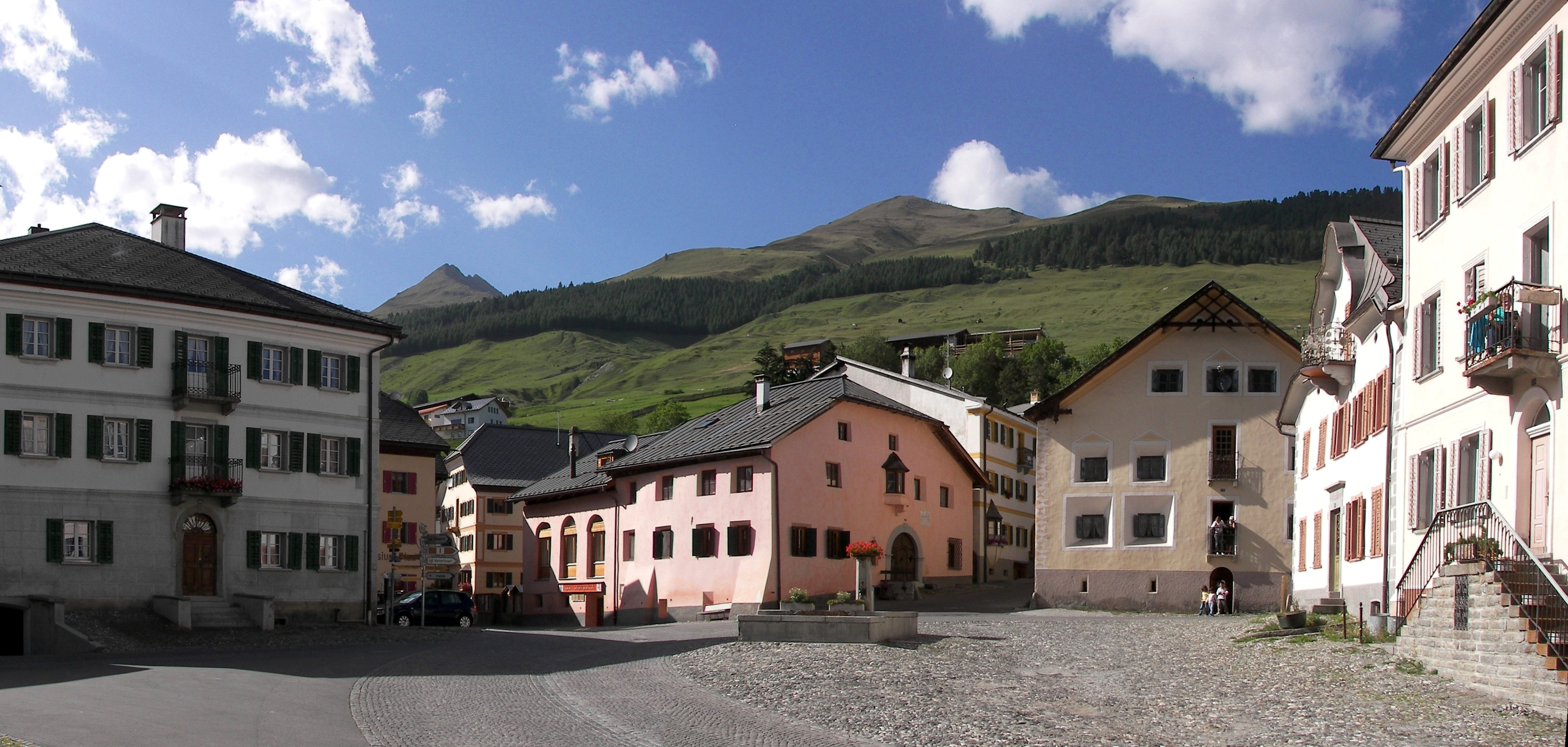
Town square in Sent

Aerial view (1947)

Sent had an area, as of 2006, of 111.7 km^{2} (43.1 sq mi). Of this area, 31.3% is used for agricultural purposes, while 24.1% is forested. Of the rest of the land, 0.7% is settled (buildings or roads) and the remainder (43.8%) is non-productive (rivers, glaciers or mountains).

The former municipality is located in the Suot Tasna sub-district of the Inn district on a terrace on the left bank of the Inn river. It consists of the village of Sent and the hamlets of Crusch and Sur En. Until the 19th century it was also known by its German name of Sins.

== Demographics ==
Sent has a population (as of 2014) of 881. As of 2008, 10.5% of the population was made up of foreign nationals. Over the last 10 years the population has decreased at a rate of -3.8%.

As of 2000, the gender distribution of the population was 48.9% male and 51.1% female. The age distribution, as of 2000, in Sent is; 99 children or 11.4% of the population are between 0 and 9 years old. 64 teenagers or 7.4% are 10 to 14, and 57 teenagers or 6.6% are 15 to 19. Of the adult population, 87 people or 10.1% of the population are between 20 and 29 years old. 134 people or 15.5% are 30 to 39, 143 people or 16.5% are 40 to 49, and 105 people or 12.1% are 50 to 59. The senior population distribution is 76 people or 8.8% of the population are between 60 and 69 years old, 64 people or 7.4% are 70 to 79, there are 28 people or 3.2% who are 80 to 89, there are 7 people or 0.8% who are 90 to 99, and 1 person or 0.1% who is 100 or more.

In the 2007 federal election the most popular party was the SVP which received 45.7% of the vote. The next three most popular parties were the SPS (32.8%), the FDP (11.2%) and the CVP (5.8%).

In Sent about 64.2% of the population (between age 25-64) have completed either non-mandatory upper secondary education or additional higher education (either university or a Fachhochschule).

Sent has an unemployment rate of 1.74%. As of 2005, there were 80 people employed in the primary economic sector and about 38 businesses involved in this sector. 68 people are employed in the secondary sector and there are 19 businesses in this sector. 171 people are employed in the tertiary sector, with 45 businesses in this sector.

The historical population is given in the following table:

year	population
1835	1,122
1850	941
1900	966
1930	782
1950	810
1970	704
1980	696
1990	770
2000	865
2010	908

== Languages ==
Most of the population (as of 2000) speaks Rhaeto-Romance (68.3%), with German being second most common (26.8%) and Italian being third ( 1.7%).

The local dialect of Romansh is known as Vallader and is today, the majority language in Sent. Through most of the 19th century, the majority of the population spoke Vallader. In 1880 88% spoke this Romansh dialect. In 1910 it was 89%, in 1941 about 91% and in 1970 86% spoke Romansh as their first language. There was a small German minority, but following 1970 it began to grow.

Languages in Sent
Languages	Census 1980		Census 1990		Census 2000	
Languages	Number	Percent	Number	Percent	Number	Percent
German	89	12.79%	154	20.00%	232	26.82%
Romansh	561	80.60%	567	73.64%	591	68.32%
Italian	32	4.60%	23	2.99%	15	1.73%
Population	696	100%	770	100%	865	100%

== Notable residents ==
Not Vital , an international and famous artist with galleries in New York, Milan and China, was born in Sent and has his home there.

Sent is also home to the German author Angelika Overath (1957–).
