= Ftan =

- Former municipality
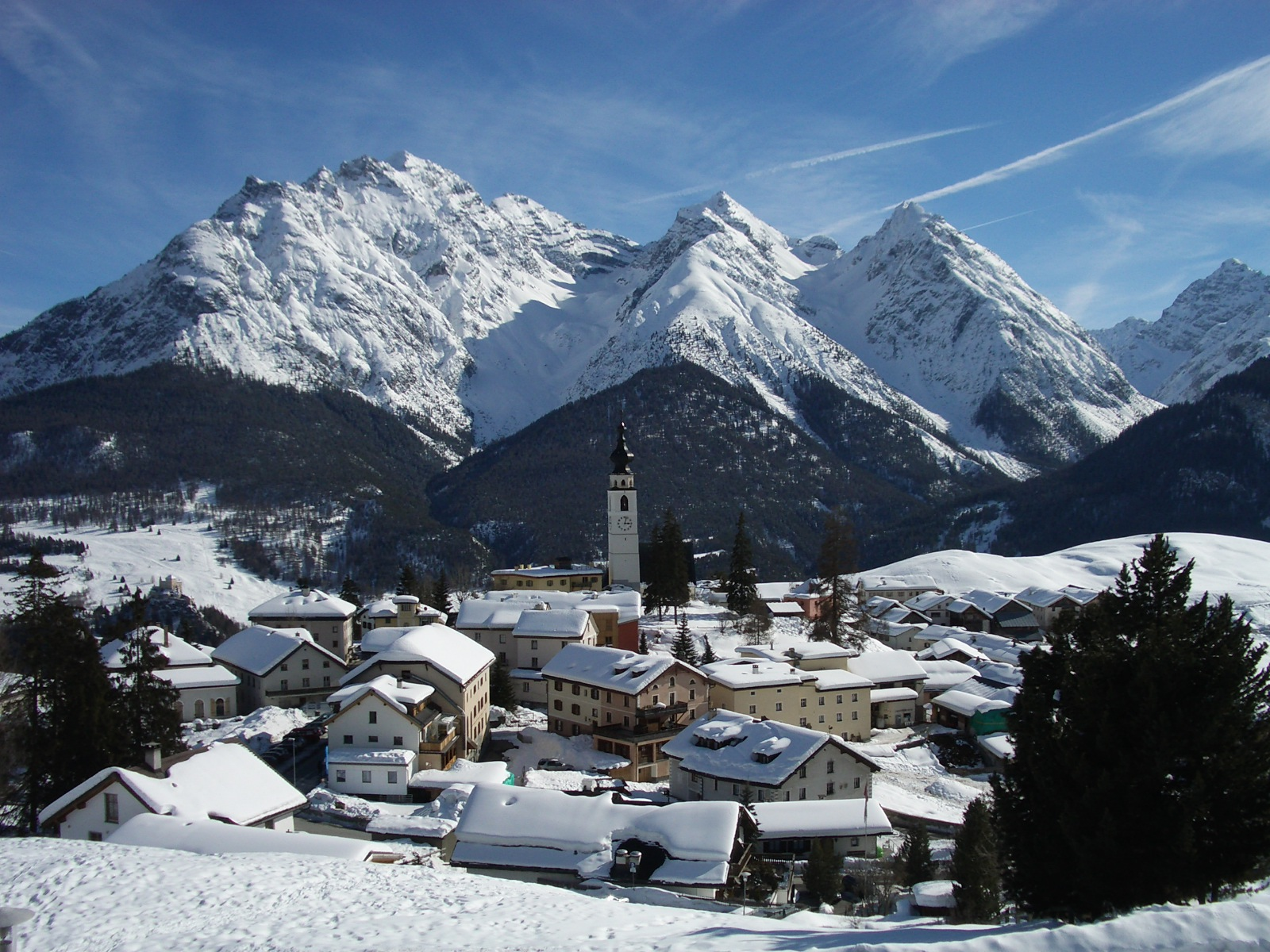

- Flag Coat of arms
- Location of Ftan
- Location within Switzerland Location within Canton of Graubünden
- Coordinates: 46°47′N 10°14′E
- Country: Switzerland
- Canton: Graubünden
- District: Inn

Area
  - Total: 43.11 km^{2} (16.64 sq mi)
- Elevation: 1,648 m (5,407 ft)

Population (Dec 2014)
  - Total: 492
  - Density: 11.4/km^{2} (29.6/sq mi)
- Time zone: UTC+01:00 (CET)
  - Summer (DST): UTC+02:00 (CEST)
- Postal code: 7551
- SFOS number: 3761
- ISO 3166 code: CH-GR
- Surrounded by: Ardez, Galtür (AT-7), Ramosch, Scuol, Sent, Tarasp
- Website: www.ftan.ch

Ftan is a former municipality in the district of Inn in the Swiss canton of Graubünden. On 1 January 2015 the former municipalities of Ardez, Guarda, Tarasp, Ftan and Sent merged into the municipality of Scuol.

== History ==
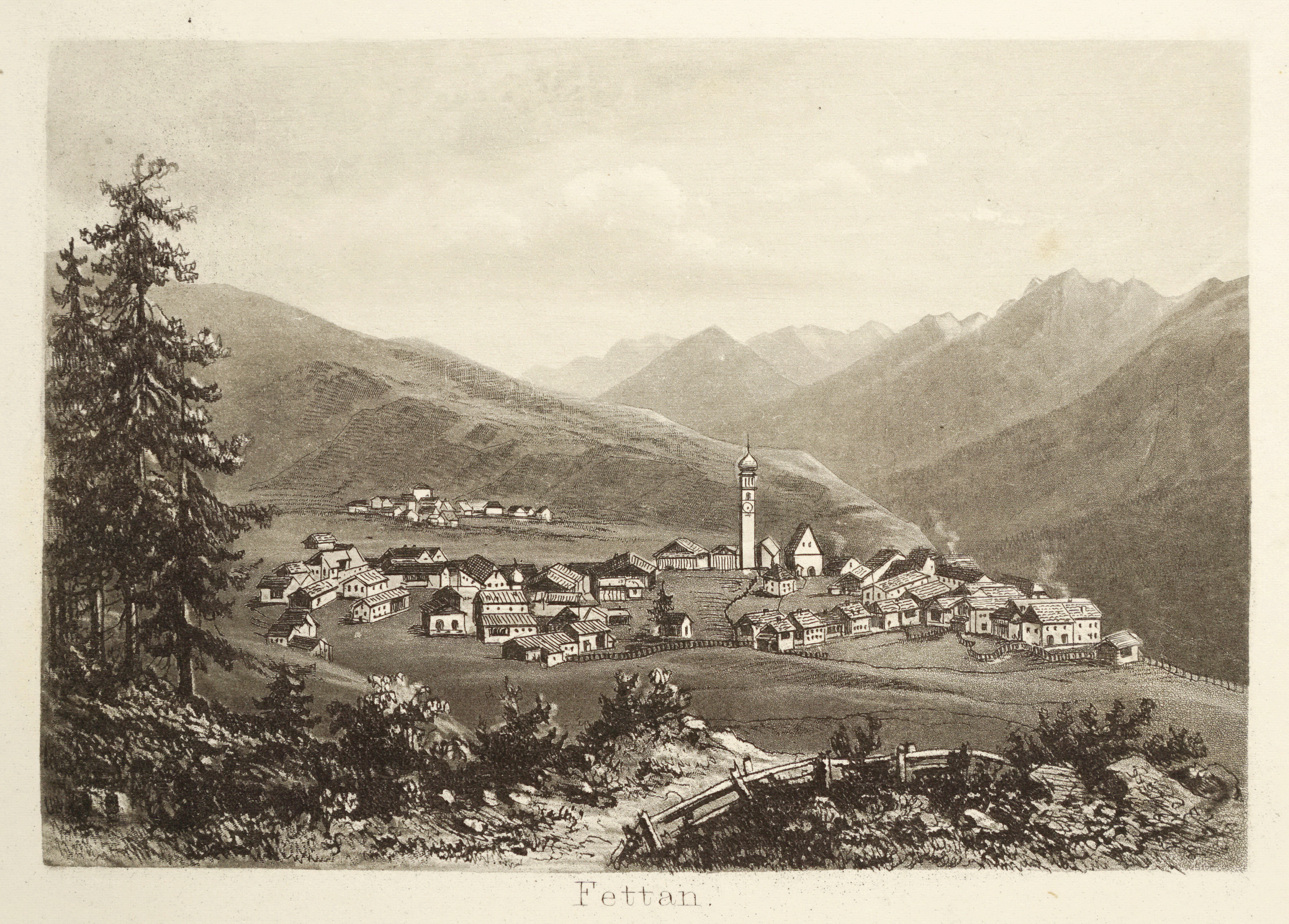
Ftan c. 1870. Etching by Heinrich Müller

Ftan is first mentioned in 1150 as Vetane. In the 12th century, the lords of Tarasp owned land in Ftan and made donations to the Müstair and Scuol monasteries. As a parish, Ftan is first documented in 1492. Around 1542, it became Protestant. In 1499, and again in 1622, Ftan was destroyed by Austrian troops. In 1652, the village finally bought its freedom from Austria.

From the 16th to the 19th century, Ftan was repeatedly devastated by avalanches and village fires (the last fire was in 1885). In 1875, the first avalanche barriers were erected and afforestation began. Between 1860 and 1862, a road was built along the bottom of the Engadin valley; since then there has been very little road traffic on the hillside of Ftan. The station of the Rhaetian Railway (opened 1913) is also far below the village.

Until the middle of the 20th century, the inhabitants of Ftan lived from arable farming. Only in the 1950s did the transition to livestock farming take place. In 1970, the first ski lifts were opened; after that, winter tourism increased rapidly and numerous holiday apartments were built.

== Geography ==
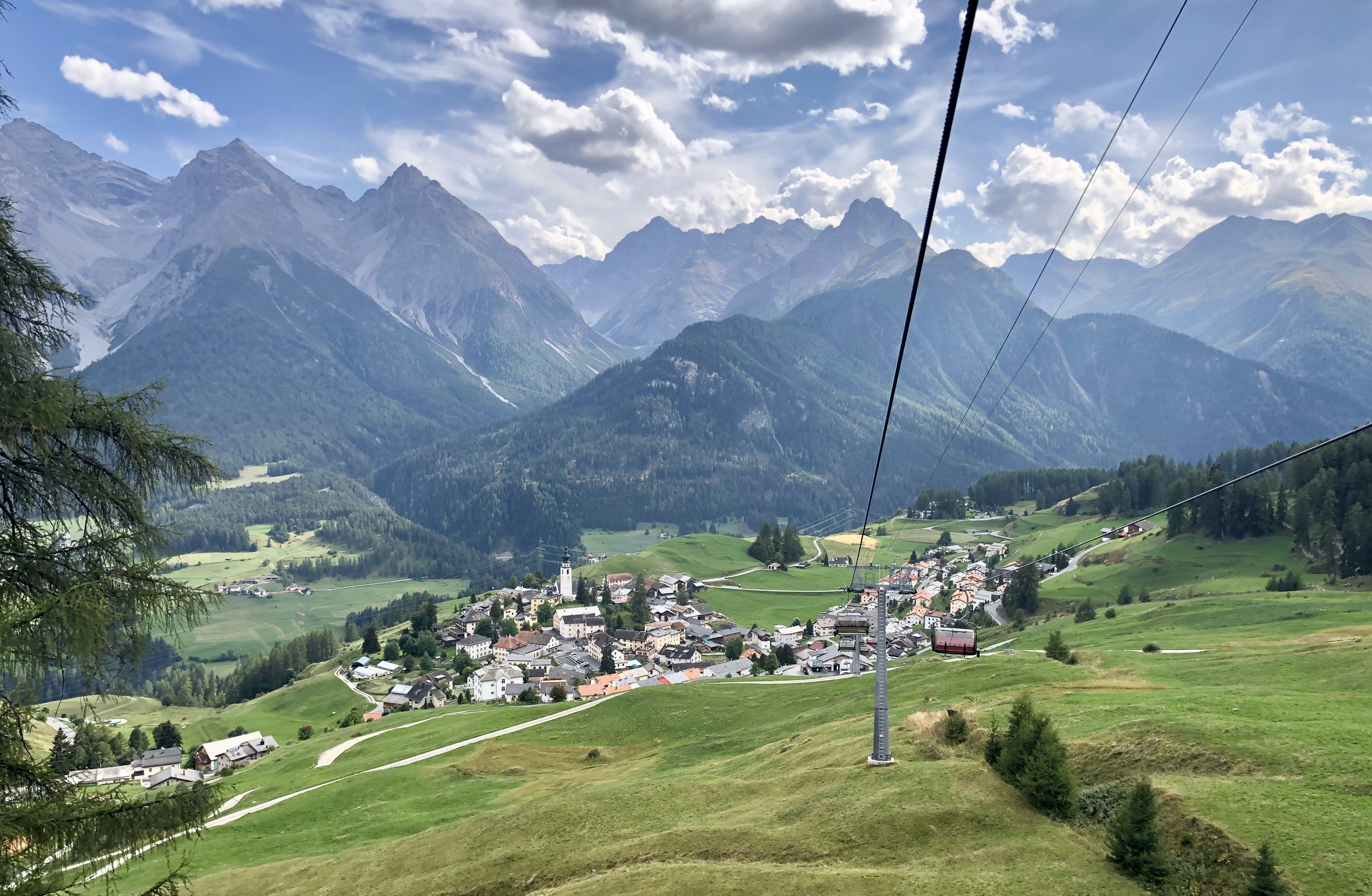
Ftan

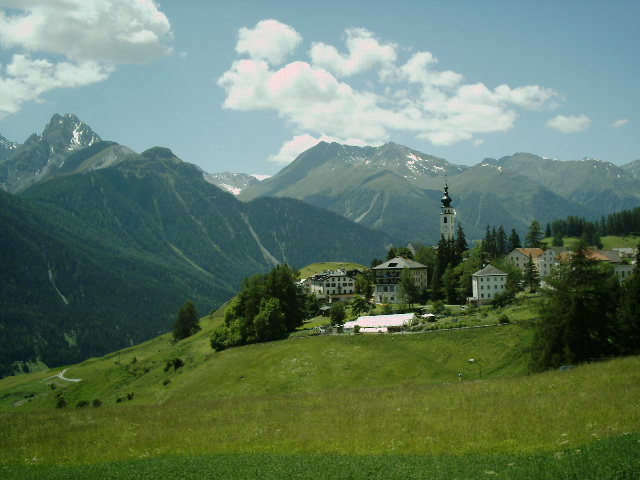
Ftan

Aerial view (1947)

Ftan had an area, as of 2006, of 43.1 km^{2} (16.6 sq mi). Of this area, 40.6% is used for agricultural purposes, while 15.4% is forested. Of the rest of the land, 1.2% is settled (buildings or roads) and the remainder (42.8%) is non-productive (rivers, glaciers or mountains).

The former municipality is located in the Suot Tasna sub-district of the Inn district on a terrace above the left bank of the Inn river. It consists of the village sections of Ftan Grond and Ftan Pitschen. Until 1943 Ftan was known as Fetan.

== Demographics ==
Ftan had a population (as of 2014) of 492. As of 2008, 11.2% of the population was made up of foreign nationals. Over the last 10 years the population has grown at a rate of 9.6%.

As of 2000, the gender distribution of the population was 49.2% male and 50.8% female. The age distribution, as of 2000, in Ftan is; 57 children or 11.0% of the population are between 0 and 9 years old. 40 teenagers or 7.8% are 10 to 14, and 84 teenagers or 16.3% are 15 to 19. Of the adult population, 39 people or 7.6% of the population are between 20 and 29 years old. 65 people or 12.6% are 30 to 39, 69 people or 13.4% are 40 to 49, and 53 people or 10.3% are 50 to 59. The senior population distribution is 43 people or 8.3% of the population are between 60 and 69 years old, 48 people or 9.3% are 70 to 79, there are 15 people or 2.9% who are 80 to 89, and there are 3 people or 0.6% who are 90 to 99.

In the 2007 federal election the most popular party was the SVP which received 43% of the vote. The next three most popular parties were the SPS (42.1%), the FDP (7.7%) and the CVP (5.1%).

In Ftan about 81.8% of the population (between age 25-64) have completed either non-mandatory upper secondary education or additional higher education (either university or a Fachhochschule).

Ftan has an unemployment rate of 0.81%. As of 2005, there were 64 people employed in the primary economic sector and about 24 businesses involved in this sector. 16 people are employed in the secondary sector and there are 6 businesses in this sector. 180 people are employed in the tertiary sector, with 25 businesses in this sector.

The historical population is given in the following table:

year	population
1835	538
1850	506
1900	403
1950	504
1970	425
2000	516

== Languages ==
Most of the population (as of 2000) speaks Rhaeto-Romance (57.8%), with German being second most common (37.0%) and Italian being third ( 1.2%).

Languages in Ftan
Languages	Census 1980		Census 1990		Census 2000	
Languages	Number	Percent	Number	Percent	Number	Percent
German	139	31.95%	153	33.77%	191	37.02%
Romansh	251	57.70%	263	58.06%	298	57.75%
Italian	19	4.37%	14	3.09%	6	1.16%
Population	435	100%	453	100%	516	100%

== Hochalpines Institut Ftan ==
In 1793 the Ftan priest Andrea Rosius à Porta, influenced by Ulysses von Salis-Marschlins and Johann Heinrich Pestalozzi, founded an institute for boys and girls which existed until 1869. This was followed in 1916 by the Hochalpines Töchterinstitut, which since the 1970s has also been a regional secondary school with federally recognised maturities and diplomas (since 1993 Hochalpines Institut Ftan).
