= Guarda, Switzerland =

Guarda
- Former municipality
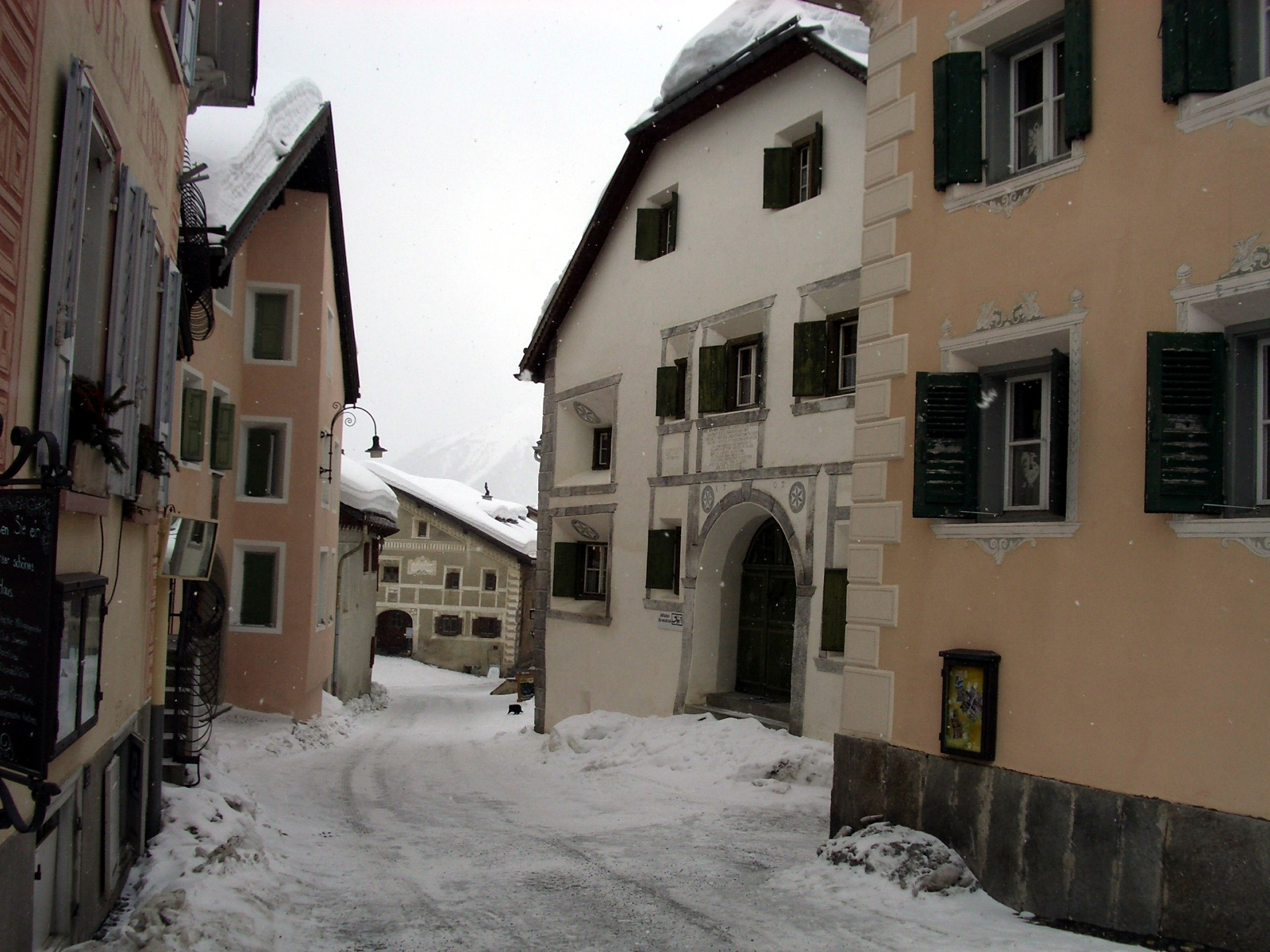
- Guarda Village

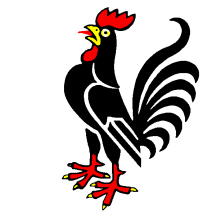
- Flag Coat of arms
- Location of Guarda
- Location within Switzerland Location within Canton of Graubünden
- Coordinates: 46°46.524′N 10°9.1525′E
- Country: Switzerland
- Canton: Graubünden
- District: Inn

Area
  - Total: 31.5 km^{2} (12.2 sq mi)
- Elevation: 1,653 m (5,423 ft)

Population (Dec 2014)
  - Total: 155
  - Density: 4.92/km^{2} (12.7/sq mi)
- Time zone: UTC+01:00 (CET)
  - Summer (DST): UTC+02:00 (CEST)
- Postal code: 7545
- SFOS number: 3742
- ISO 3166 code: CH-GR
- Surrounded by: Ardez, Galtür (AT-7), Gaschurn (AT-8), Lavin
- Website: www.guarda.ch

Guarda is a former municipality in Inn District in the Swiss canton of Graubünden. On 1 January 2015 the former municipalities of Ardez, Guarda, Tarasp, Ftan and Sent merged into the municipality of Scuol.

Guarda was awarded the Wakker Prize for the preservation of its architectural heritage in 1975.

== History ==
Guarda is first mentioned in 1160 as Warda. Between 1939 and 1945 a major building renovation was carried on in Guarda which was conducted by the Swiss architect Iachen Ulrich Könz.

== Geography ==
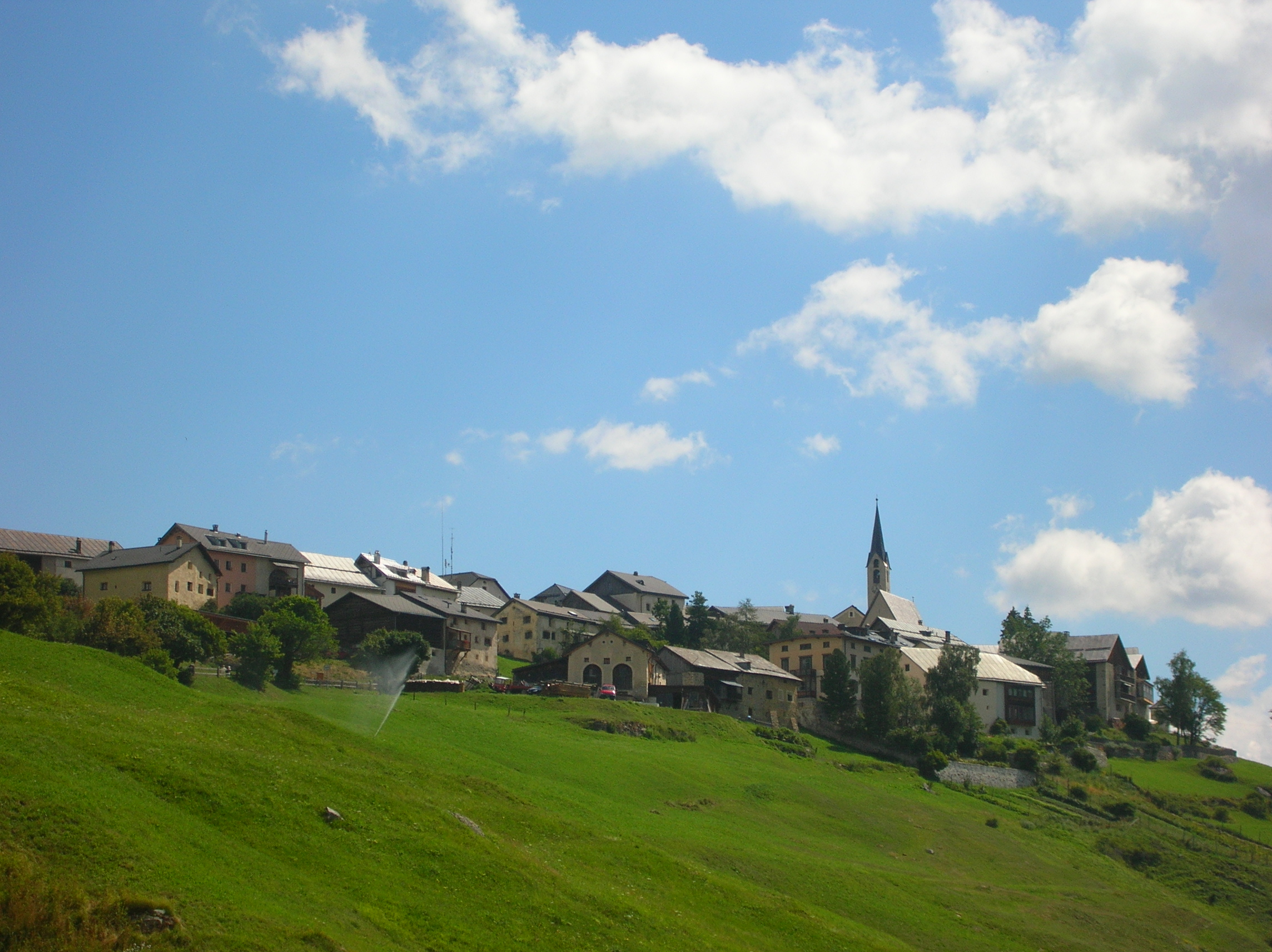
Guarda

Aerial view by Walter Mittelholzer (1925)

Guarda had an area, as of 2006, of 31.5 km^{2} (12.2 sq mi). Of this area, 35.5% is used for agricultural purposes, while 12.5% is forested. Of the rest of the land, 0.7% is settled (buildings or roads) and the remainder (51.4%) is non-productive (rivers, glaciers or mountains).

The former municipality is located in the Sur Tasna sub-district of the Inn district on a terrace above the left bank of the Inn river. It consists of the linear village of Guarda above the valley and the settlement of Giarsun along the valley floor.

== Demographics ==
Guarda had a population (as of 2014) of 155. As of 2008, 13.5% of the population was made up of foreign nationals. Over the last 10 years the population has decreased at a rate of -13.4%.

As of 2000, the gender distribution of the population was 49.7% male and 50.3% female. The age distribution, as of 2000, in Guarda is; 8 children or 5.6% of the population are between 0 and 9 years old. 9 teenagers or 6.3% are 10 to 14, and 7 teenagers or 4.9% are 15 to 19. Of the adult population, 16 people or 11.1% of the population are between 20 and 29 years old. 13 people or 9.0% are 30 to 39, 28 people or 19.4% are 40 to 49, and 17 people or 11.8% are 50 to 59. The senior population distribution is 13 people or 9.0% of the population are between 60 and 69 years old, 21 people or 14.6% are 70 to 79, there are 12 people or 8.3% who are 80 to 89.

In the 2007 federal election the most popular party was the SVP which received 46.3% of the vote. The next three most popular parties were the SPS (35%), the CVP (8.7%) and the FDP (7.4%).

The entire Swiss population is generally well educated. In Guarda about 77.3% of the population (between age 25-64) have completed either non-mandatory upper secondary education or additional higher education (either university or a Fachhochschule).

Guarda has an unemployment rate of 1.83%. As of 2005, there were 27 people employed in the primary economic sector and about 12 businesses involved in this sector. 19 people are employed in the secondary sector and there are 8 businesses in this sector. 56 people are employed in the tertiary sector, with 14 businesses in this sector.

The historical population is given in the following table:

year	population
1850	280
1900	245
1950	193
1980	134
1990	165
2000	144

== Transport ==
Guarda railway station is an intermediate stop on the Bever to Scuol-Tarasp line of the Rhaetian Railway.

== Wakker Prize ==
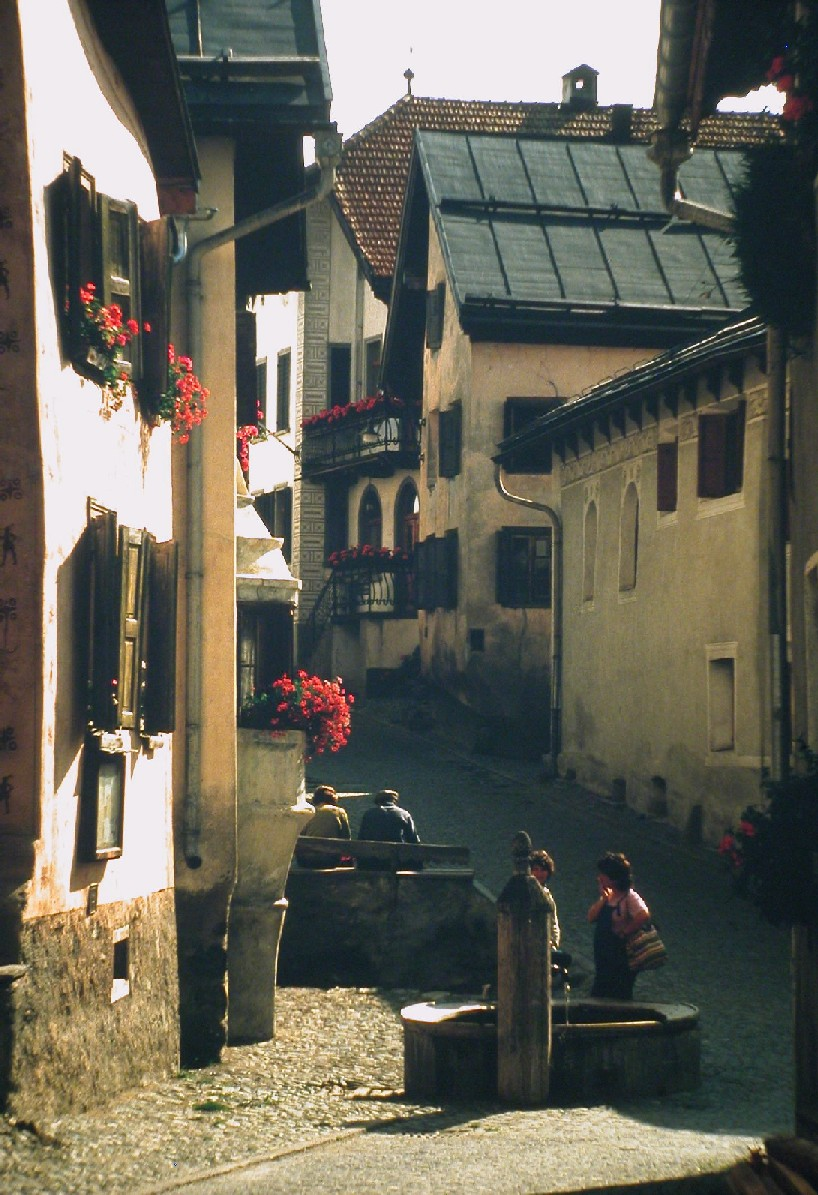
Fountain in the village of Guarda

In 1975 the Swiss Heritage Society awarded Guarda the Wakker Prize for the preservation of its architectural heritage. The award notes that it is one of the best preserved and characteristic villages of the Unterengadin. It notes that the municipality struggled with a harsh landscape and the demands of tourism as well as the migration of young people from the village into the cities of Switzerland.

== Languages ==
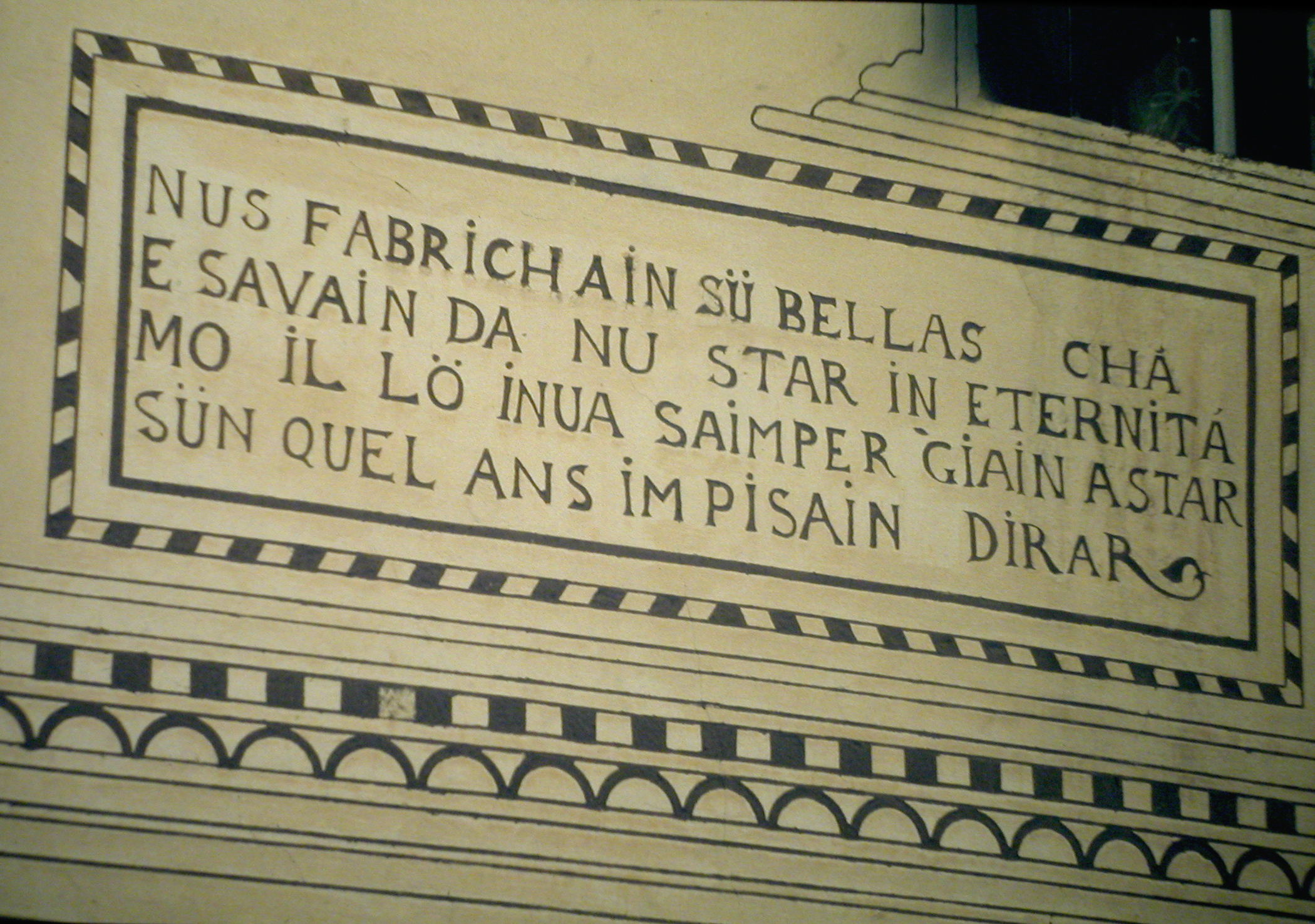
Romansh sgraffito in Guarda

Most of the population (as of 2000) speaks Rhaeto-Romance (62.5%), with German being second most common (30.6%) and French being third (2.8%). The majority of the population speaks the Vallader dialect of Romansh. Until the 1980s, the village was almost totally Romansh speaking (1880 96%, 1900 99%, 1941 91% and 1980 90%). While the village school still supports the Romansh language, the German-speaking population is growing in Guarda.

Languages in Guarda
Languages	Census 1980		Census 1990		Census 2000	
Languages	Number	Percent	Number	Percent	Number	Percent
German	9	6.72%	42	25.45%	44	30.56%
Romanish	121	90.30%	119	72.12%	90	62.50%
Population	134	100%	165	100%	144	100%
