= Ardez =

- Former municipality
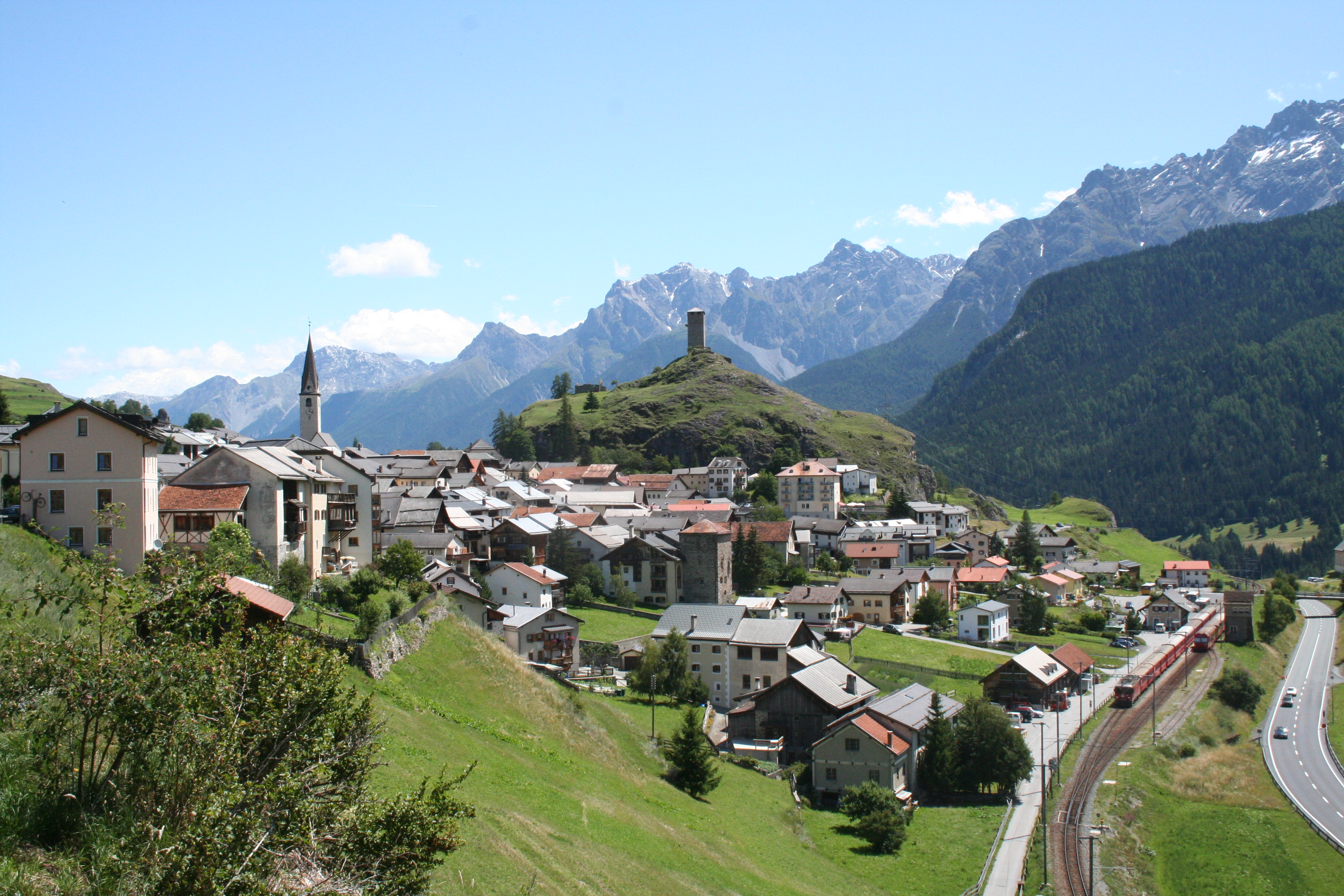

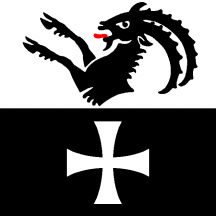
- Flag Coat of arms
- Location of Ardez
- Location within Switzerland Location within Canton of Graubünden
- Coordinates: 46°46′N 10°12′E
- Country: Switzerland
- Canton: Graubünden
- District: Inn

Area
  - Total: 61.43 km^{2} (23.72 sq mi)
- Elevation: 1,467 m (4,813 ft)

Population (Dec 2014)
  - Total: 427
  - Density: 6.95/km^{2} (18.0/sq mi)
- Time zone: UTC+01:00 (CET)
  - Summer (DST): UTC+02:00 (CEST)
- Postal code: 7546
- SFOS number: 3741
- ISO 3166 code: CH-GR
- Surrounded by: Ftan, Galtür (Austria), Guarda, Lavin, Tarasp, Zernez
- Website: www.ardez.ch

Ardez (Romansh pronunciation: [ɐrˈdɛts]) is a former municipality in the district of Inn in the canton of Graubünden in eastern Switzerland. The village is located in the Lower Engadin valley. On 1 January 2015 the former municipalities of Ardez, Guarda, Tarasp, Ftan and Sent merged into the municipality of Scuol.

== History ==
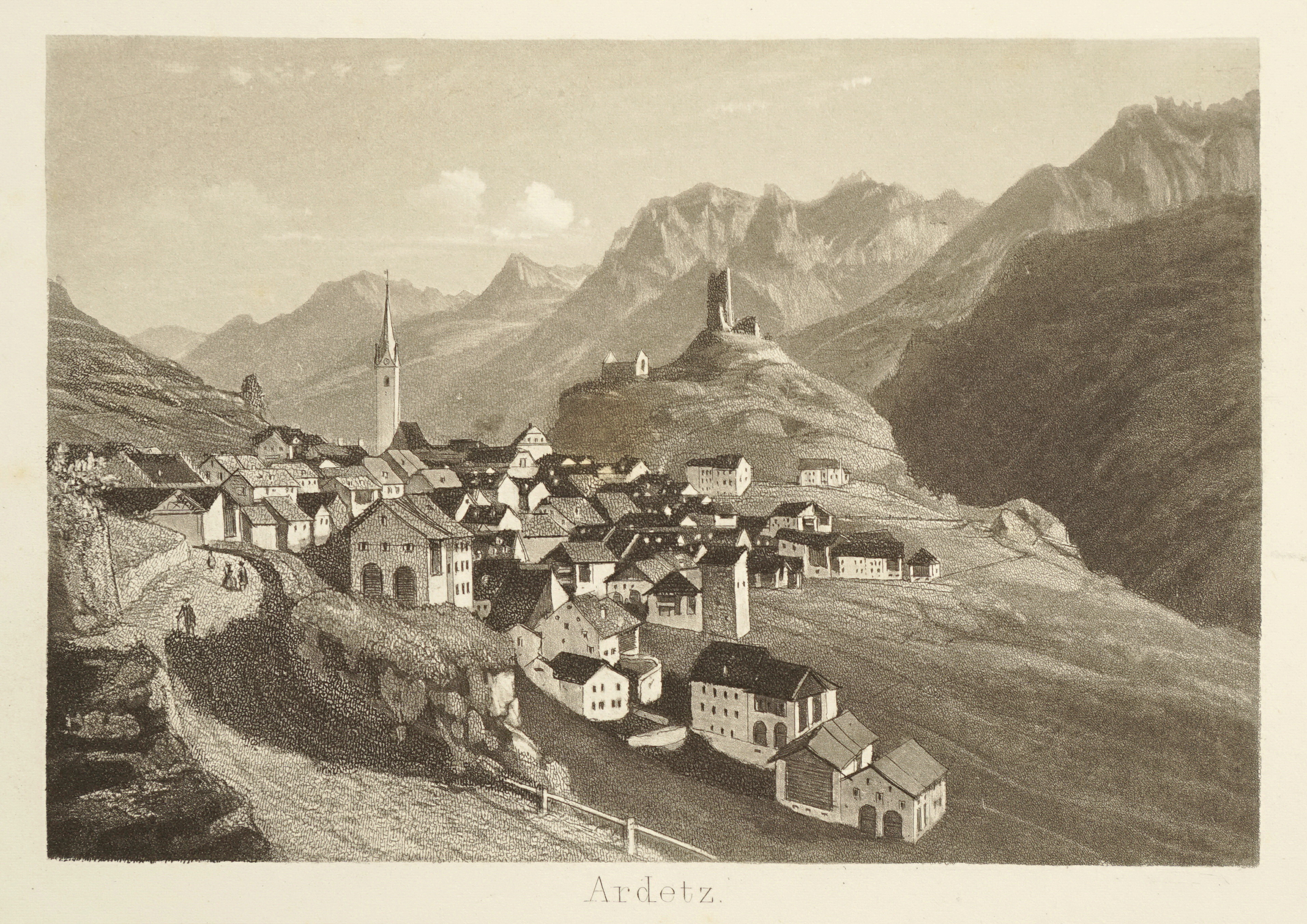
Ardez and Steinsberg Castle c. 1870. Etching by Heinrich Müller

Ardez is first mentioned circa 840 as Ardezis. Up to the 19th century, it was also known by the German name of Steinsberg. Lords de Ardetz are documented for the period 1161–1310. The lords of Tarasp, the bishop of Chur, Marienberg Abbey, the county of Tyrol and the bailiffs of Matsch had possessions and rights in Ardez. Steinsberg Castle, the castle of Ardez, was bought by the bishop of Chur before 1209. It was destroyed together with the village in 1499 during the Swabian War. (The tower has been restored several times.)

The old parish of Ardez also included Guarda, Lavin, Susch and Galtür in the Tyrolean Paznaun valley. In 1538 it became Protestant. The church was rebuilt 1576/1577. In 1622 Ardez was destroyed by Austrian troops; in 1652 it bought its freedom from Austria.

The inhabitants of Ardez farmed their arable land and raised cattle; until the middle of the 19th century they also exported wood to Tyrol. In 1913, Ardez railway station was opened. In 1975, the largely intact village of Ardez was chosen as one of four Swiss model villages for the European year of monument preservation; after that, numerous houses were renovated.

== Geography ==
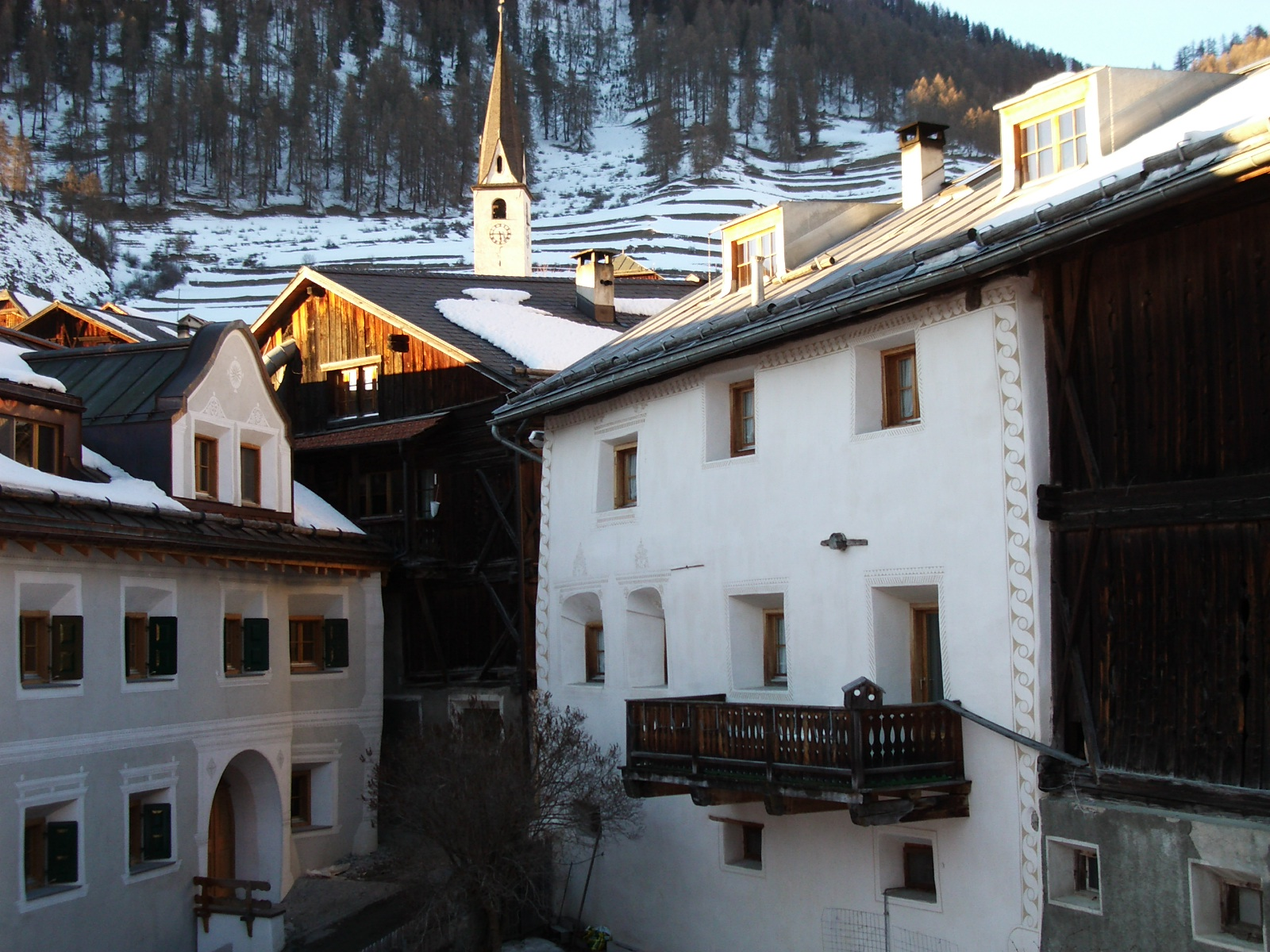
Village center

Ardez had an area, as of 2006, of 61.4 km^{2} (23.7 sq mi). Of this area, 29.7% is used for agricultural purposes, while 20% is forested. Of the rest of the land, 0.8% is settled (buildings or roads) and the remainder (49.5%) is non-productive (rivers, glaciers or mountains).

The former municipality is located in the Sur Tasna sub-district of the Inn district, with the village on the left bank of the Inn river. It consists of the village of Ardez and the hamlets of Bos-cha and Sur En.

== Demographics ==
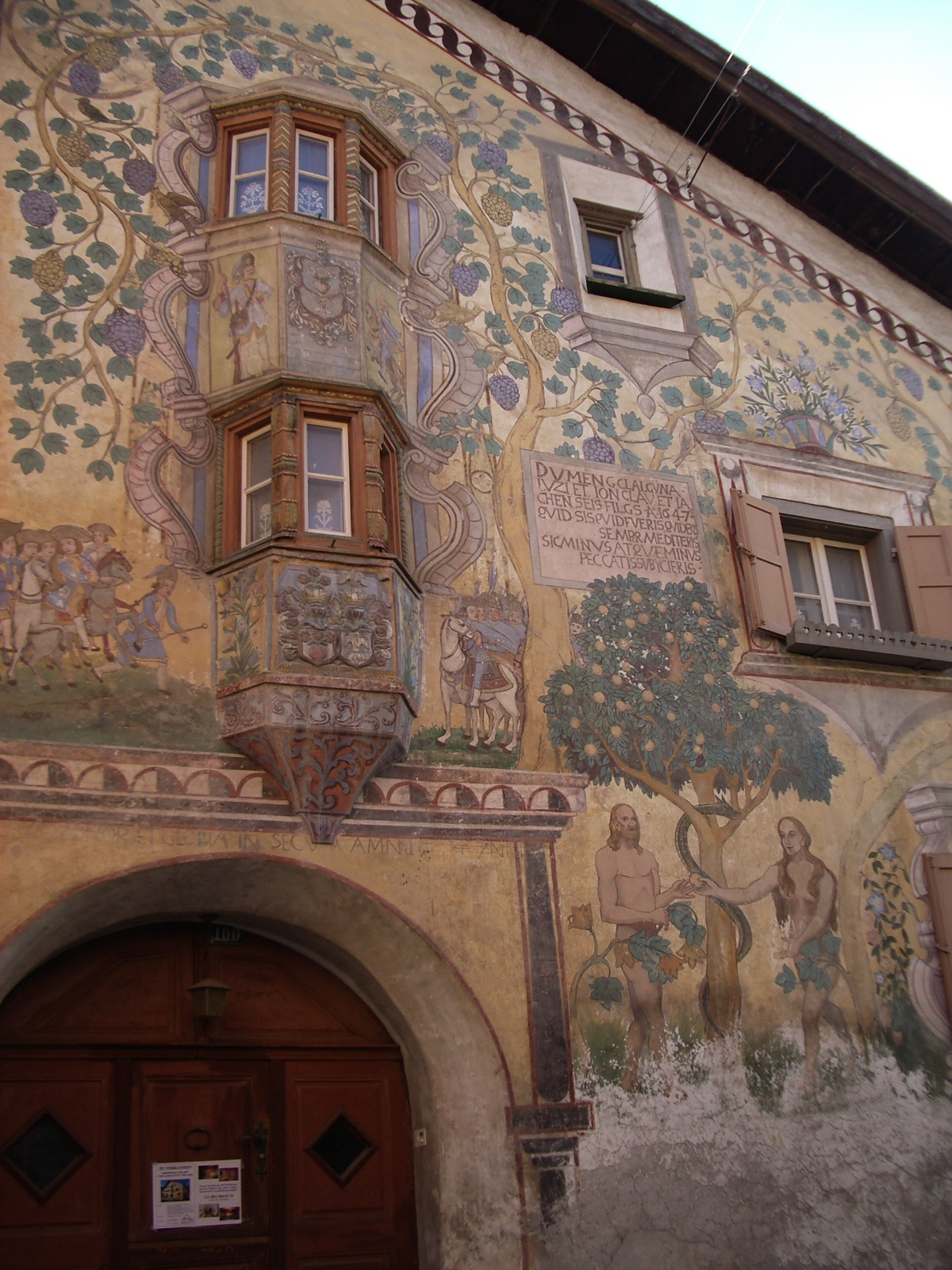
Sgraffito decorated house in Ardez

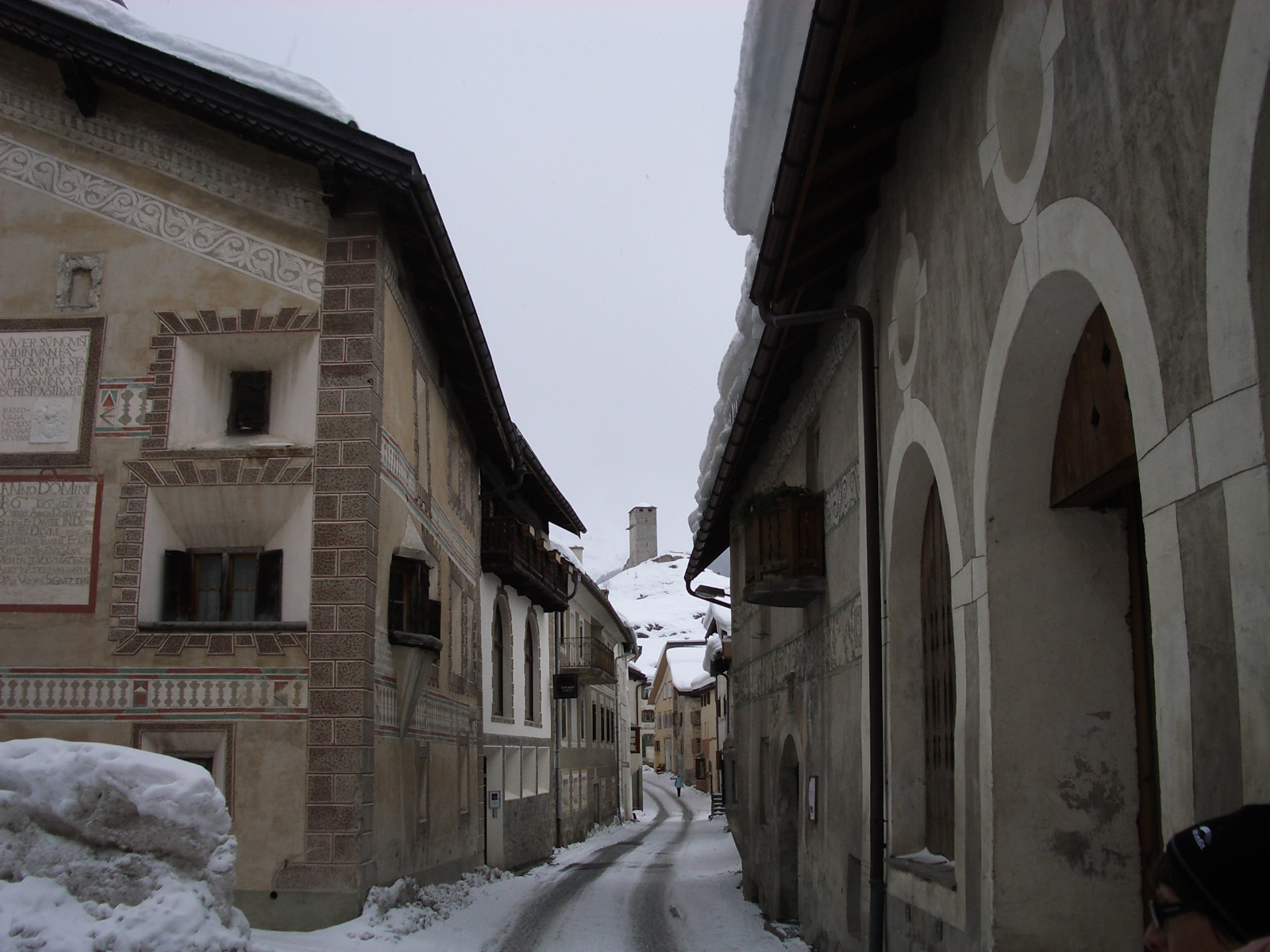
Street in Ardez

Ardez had a population (as of 2014) of 427. As of 2007, 9.8% of the population was made up of foreign nationals. Over the last 10 years the population has grown at a rate of 0.5%.

As of 2000, the gender distribution of the population was 52.0% male and 48.0% female. The age distribution, as of 2000, in Ardez is; 48 children or 12.0% of the population are between 0 and 9 years old. 23 teenagers or 5.7% are 10 to 14, and 23 teenagers or 5.7% are 15 to 19. Of the adult population, 40 people or 10.0% of the population are between 20 and 29 years old. 55 people or 13.7% are 30 to 39, 54 people or 13.5% are 40 to 49, and 58 people or 14.5% are 50 to 59. The senior population distribution is 35 people or 8.7% of the population are between 60 and 69 years old, 42 people or 10.5% are 70 to 79, there are 20 people or 5.0% who are 80 to 89, and there are 3 people or 0.7% who are 90 to 99.

In the 2007 federal election the most popular party was the SVP which received 47.3% of the vote. The next three most popular parties were the SPS (29.8%), the FDP (13.8%) and the CVP (7.2%).

In Ardez about 70% of the population (between age 25-64) have completed either non-mandatory upper secondary education or additional higher education (either university or a Fachhochschule).

Ardez has an unemployment rate of 1.08%. As of 2005, there were 40 people employed in the primary economic sector and about 19 businesses involved in this sector. 33 people are employed in the secondary sector and there are 7 businesses in this sector. 49 people are employed in the tertiary sector, with 15 businesses in this sector.

The historical population is given in the following table:

year	population
1835	599
1900	612
1910	1,005^{a}
1950	541
1960	480
1970	491
1980	383
1990	393
2000	401

^a Population increase during railway construction.

== Languages ==
Aerial view by Walter Mittelholzer (1925)

Most of the population (as of 2000) speaks Rhaeto-Romance (73.8%), with German being second most common (20.2%) and Italian being third ( 3.0%). The majority of the population speak the Vallader dialect of Romansh. Romansh is taught in the village school and spoken in the municipality. Until 1900 the municipality was nearly Romansh only (1880 94%, 1900 94%). The majority dropped throughout the 20th Century (1941 84%, 1980 83%). The modern situation with languages is given in the following table:

Languages in Ardez
Languages	Census 1980		Census 1990		Census 2000	
Languages	Number	Percent	Number	Percent	Number	Percent
German	50	13.05%	78	19.85%	81	20.20%
Romansh	316	82.51%	288	73.28%	296	73.82%
Italian	17	4.44%	26	6.62%	12	2.99%
Population	383	100%	393	100%	401	100%

== Heritage sites of national significance ==
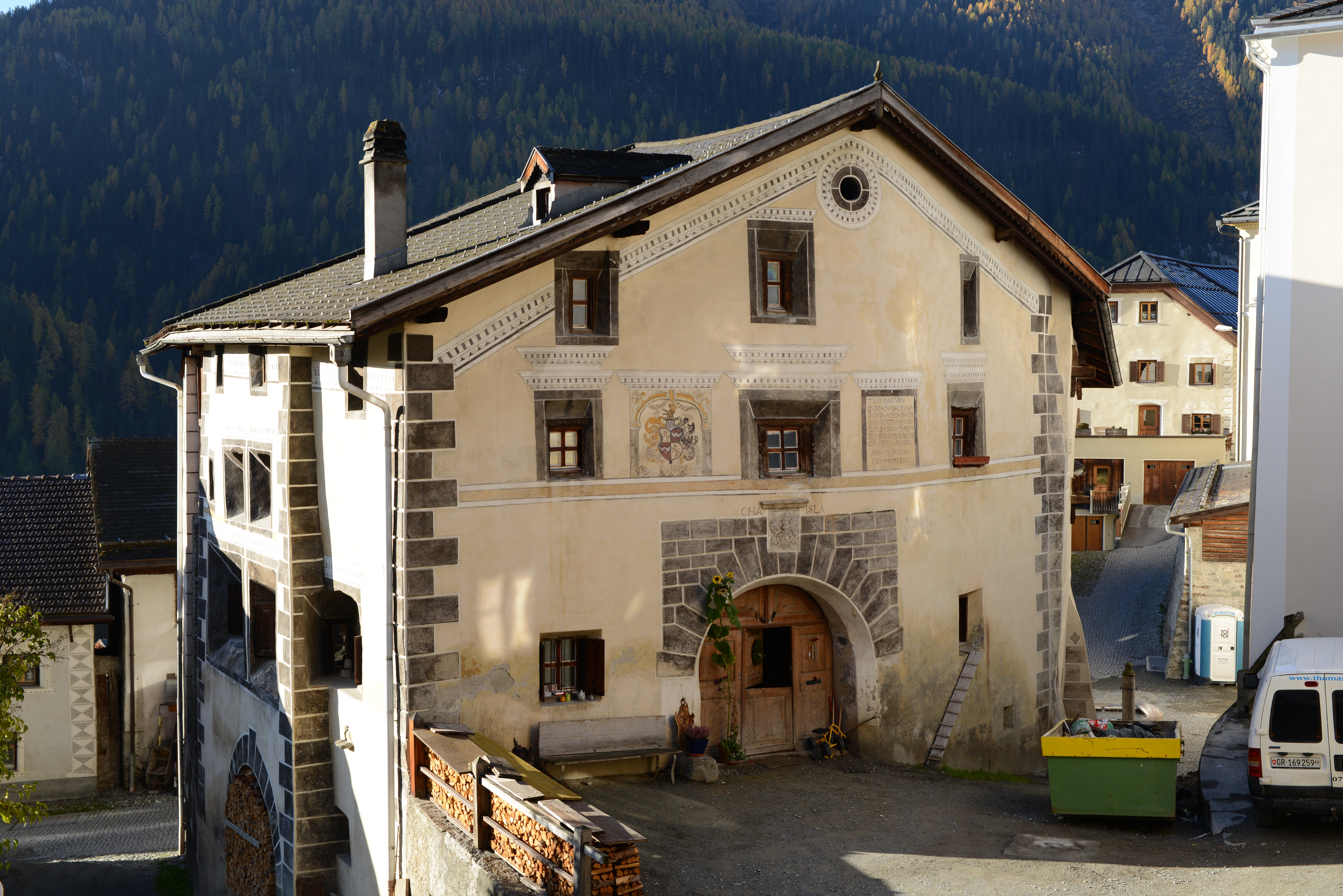
Chasa dubla

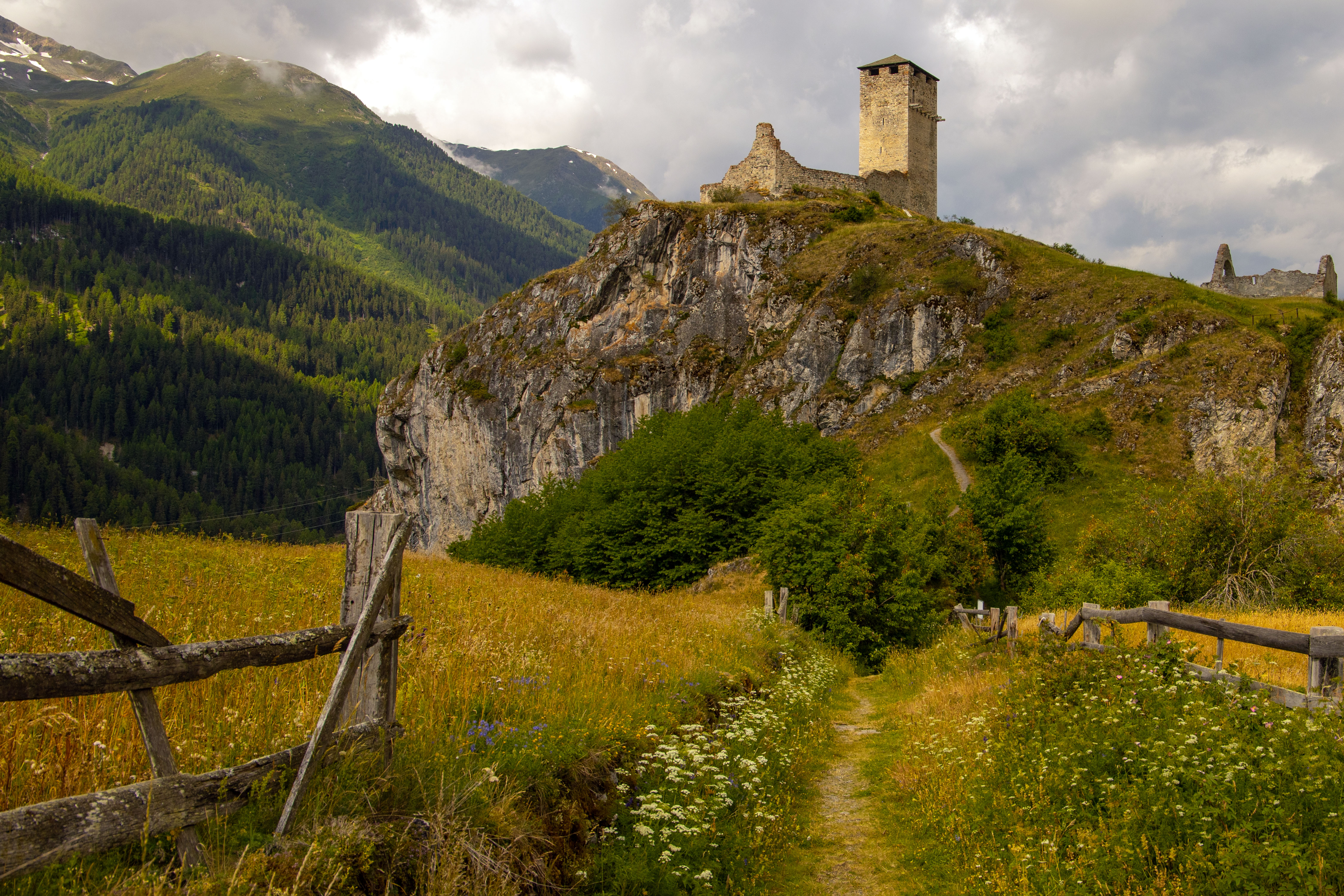
Castle ruin Steinsberg Ardez

The Chastè ("castle"; a prehistoric site, a medieval fortress and a church) and the Chasa dubla (Double-house) with barn are listed as Swiss heritage sites of national significance.

The Chastè site includes settlements from the late Bronze Age (Melauner culture) into the early Iron Age (Fritzens-Sanzeno culture) as well as some finds from the Roman Empire.

== Photo gallery Ruina chanoua at Ardez ==
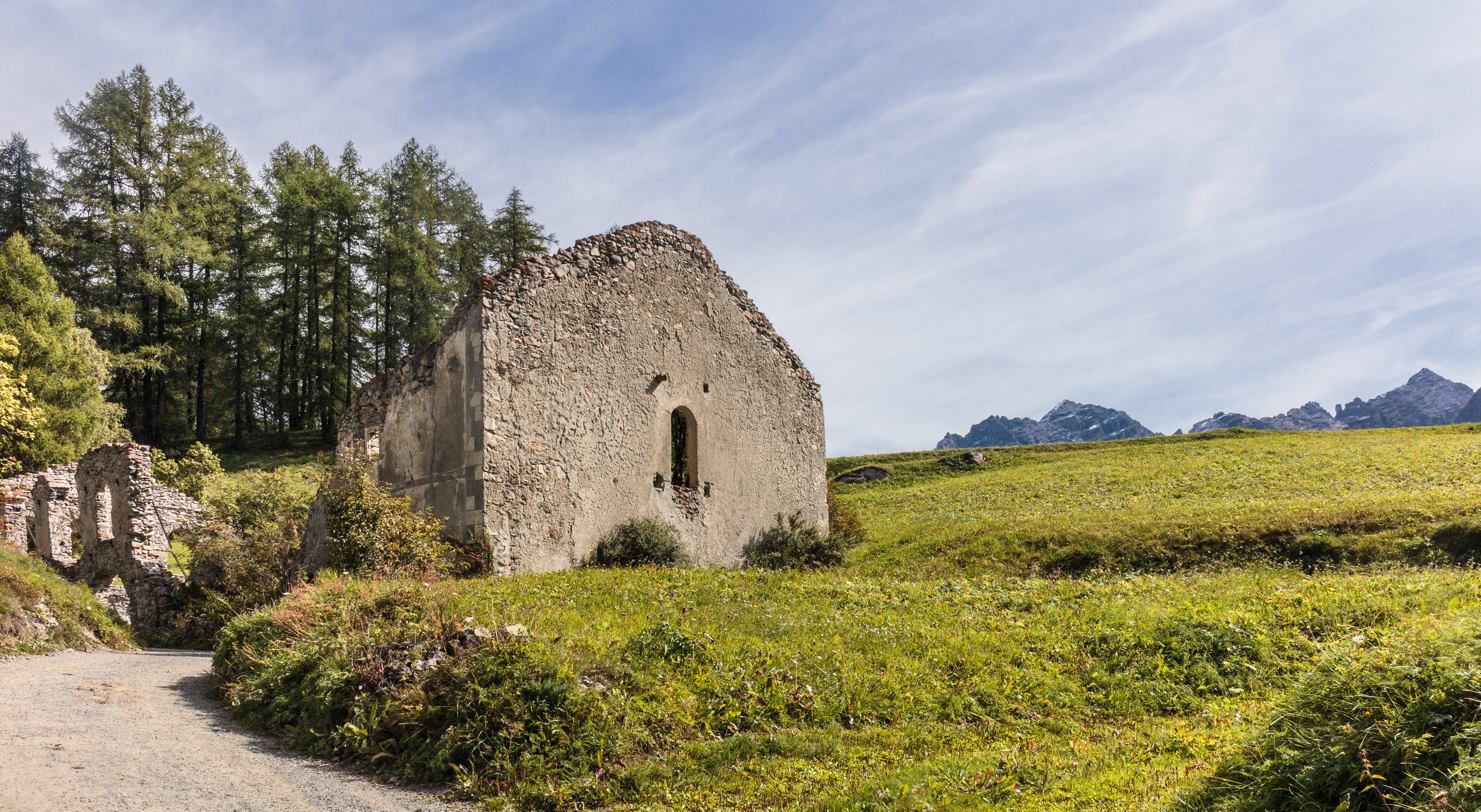
West side.

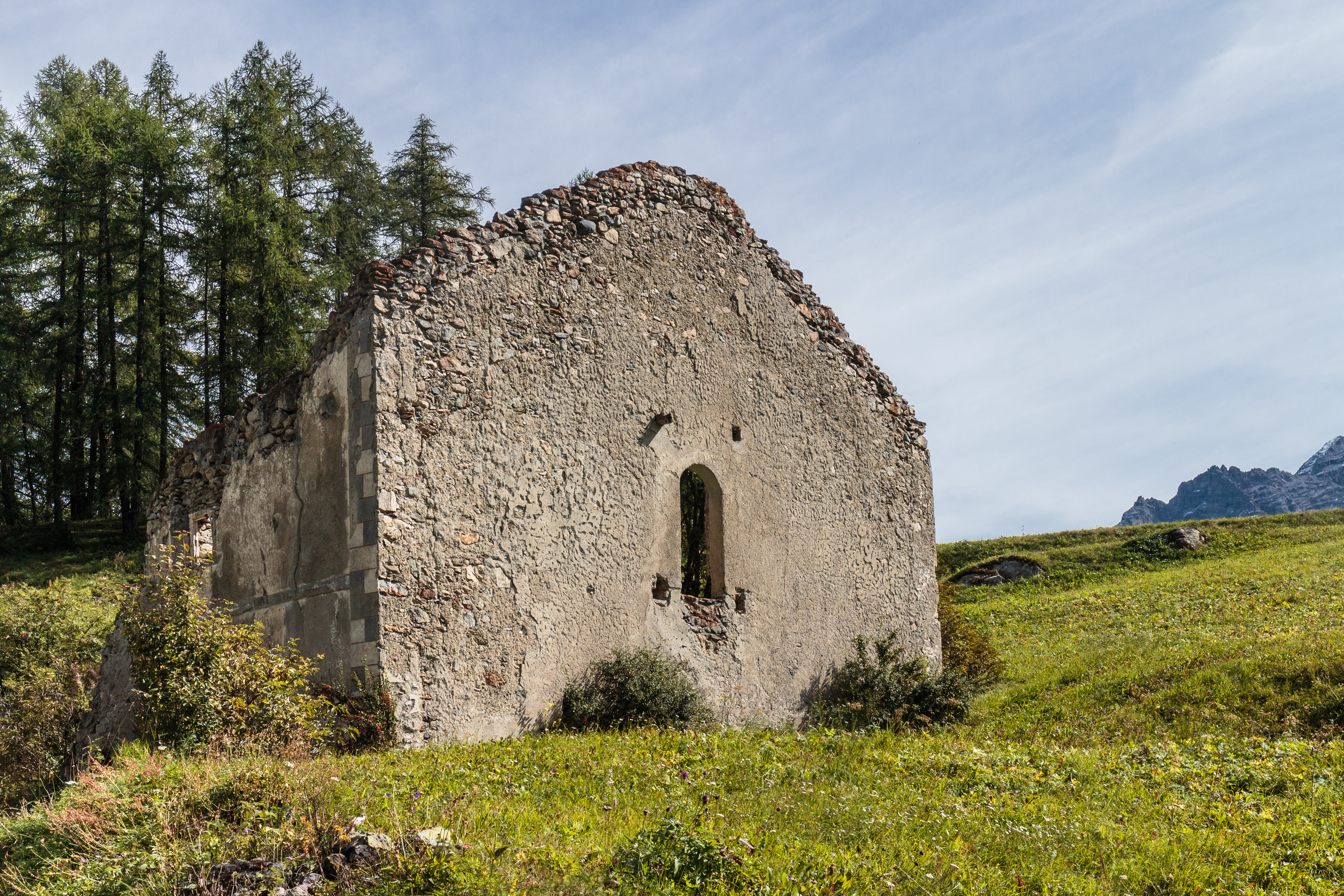
South side.

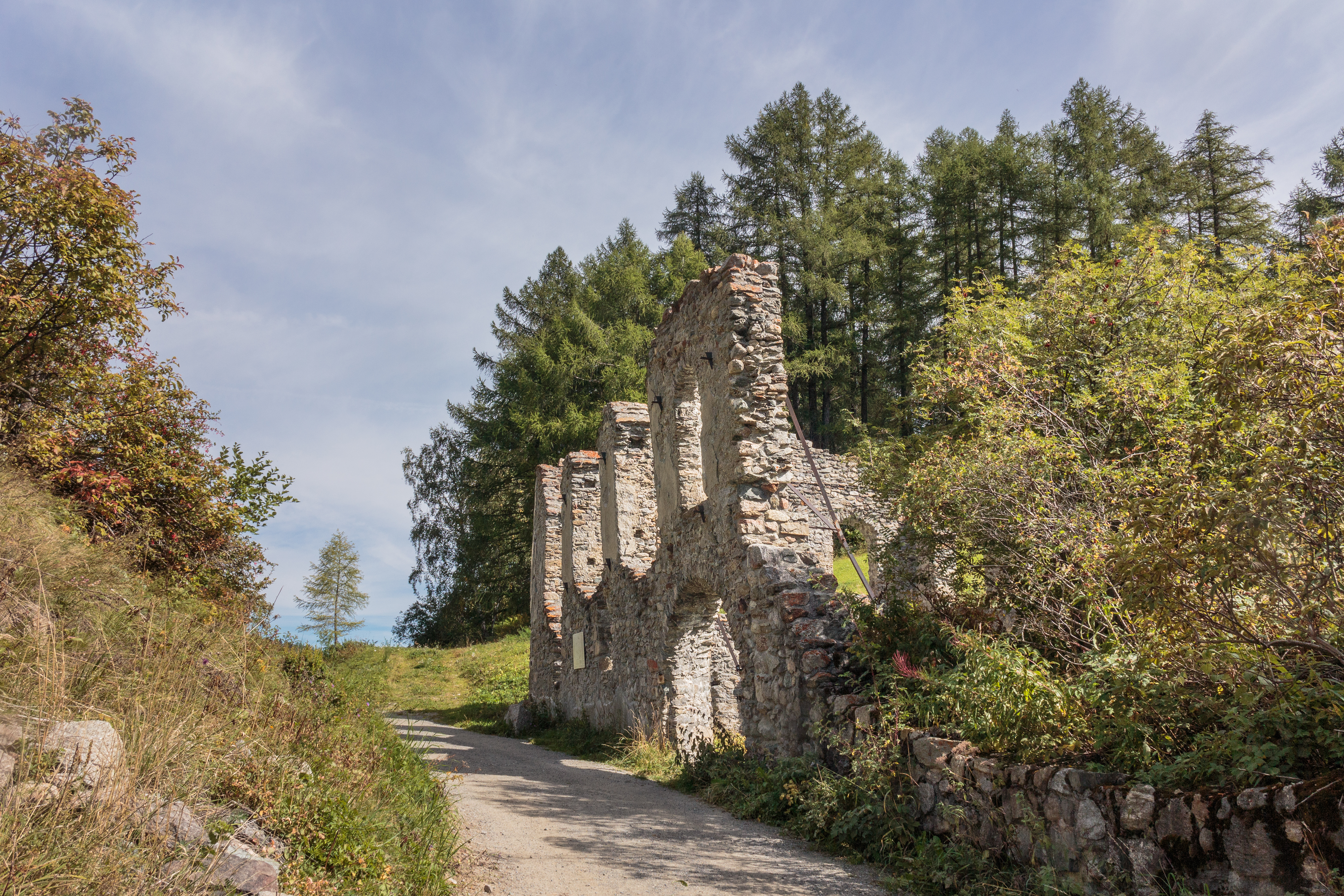
North side.

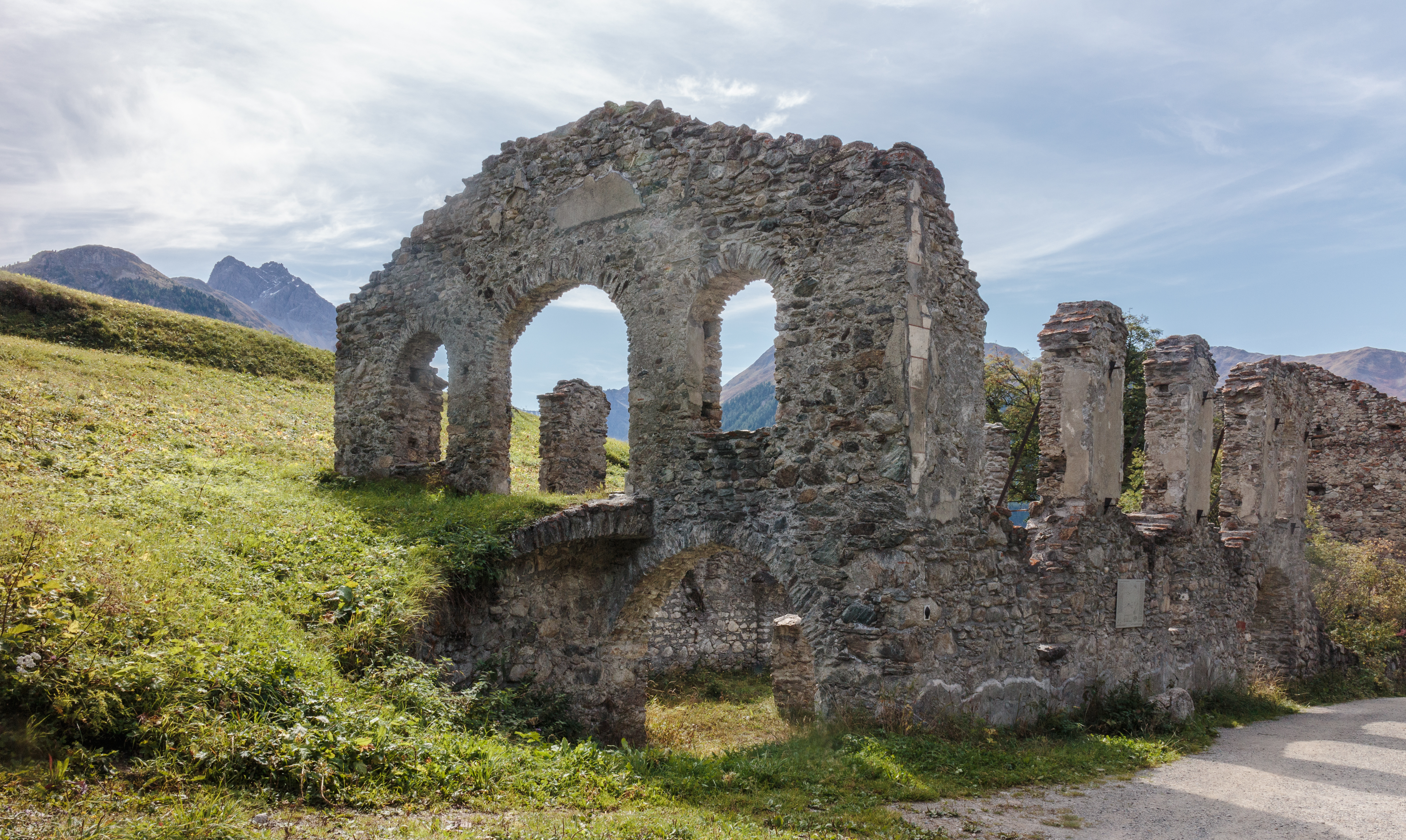
East side.

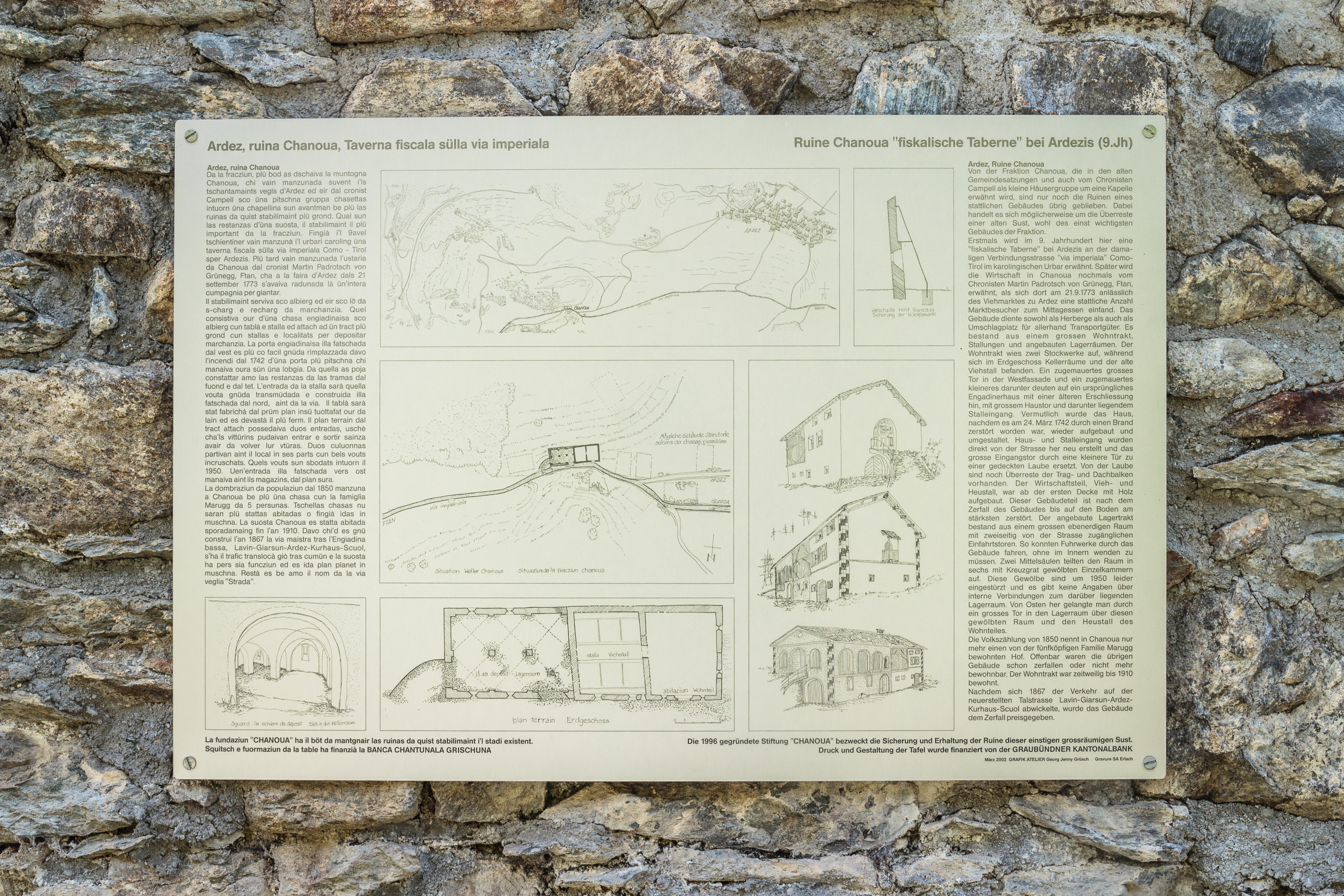
Information panel.
