= Sunniberg Bridge =

Extradosed road bridge in the canton of Grisons, Switzerland

Sunniberg Bridge Sunnibergbrücke
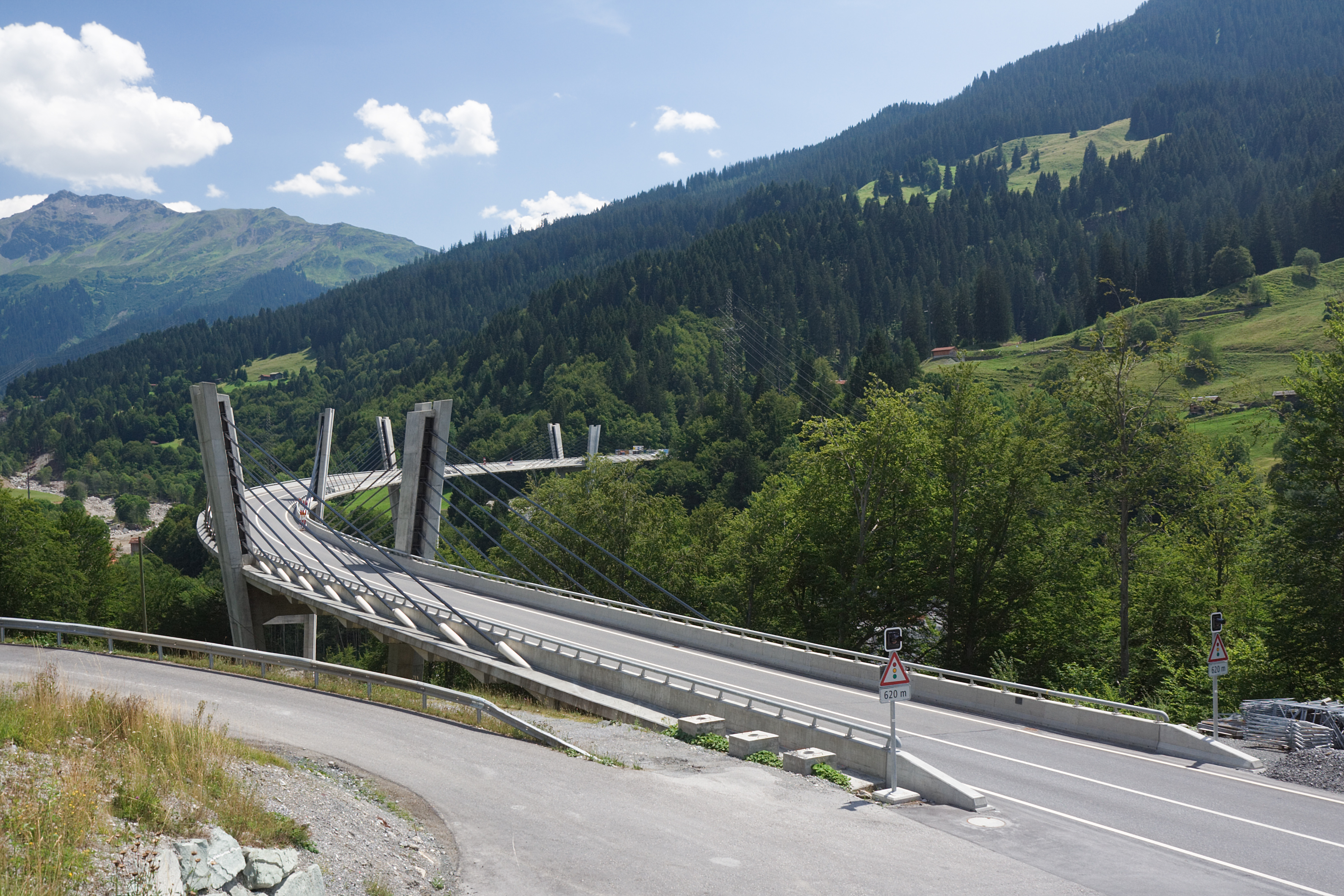
- View from north abutment looking south east
- Coordinates: 46°53′07″N 9°51′24″E
- Carries: Motor vehicles
- Crosses: Landquart River
- Locale: Klosters, Switzerland
- Official name: Sunniberg Bridge

Characteristics
- Design: curved multi-span extradosed bridge
- Total length: 526 m (1,726 ft)
- Width: 12.378 m (40.61 ft)
- Longest span: 140.00 m (459.32 ft)
- No. of spans: 5
- Clearance below: 50 m to 60 m above valley floor
- No. of lanes: 2

History
- Architect: Andrea Deplazes
- Designer: Christian Menn
- Constructed by: Batigroup AG and Vetsch AG
- Construction end: Fall 1998
- Construction cost: Swiss Franc 17 million
- Opened: 9 December 2005

Location
- Interactive map of Sunniberg Bridge

The Sunniberg Bridge is a curved multi-span extradosed road bridge with low outward-flaring pylons above the roadway edges, designed by the renowned Swiss engineer Christian Menn and completed 1998. It carries the Klosters bypass road 28 across the Landquart River near the village of Klosters in the canton of Grisons in eastern Switzerland. It is notable because of its innovative design and aesthetically pleasing appearance sensitive to its surroundings.

== Design ==
The bridge was designed by Christian Menn (conceptual design) together with Dialma Jakob Baenziger (final design) as a challenge of integrating the structural form of a curved multi-span extradosed bridge into the larger rural Alpine landscape, given the prominent location of the bridge in the Landquart valley, "but with a certain elegance".

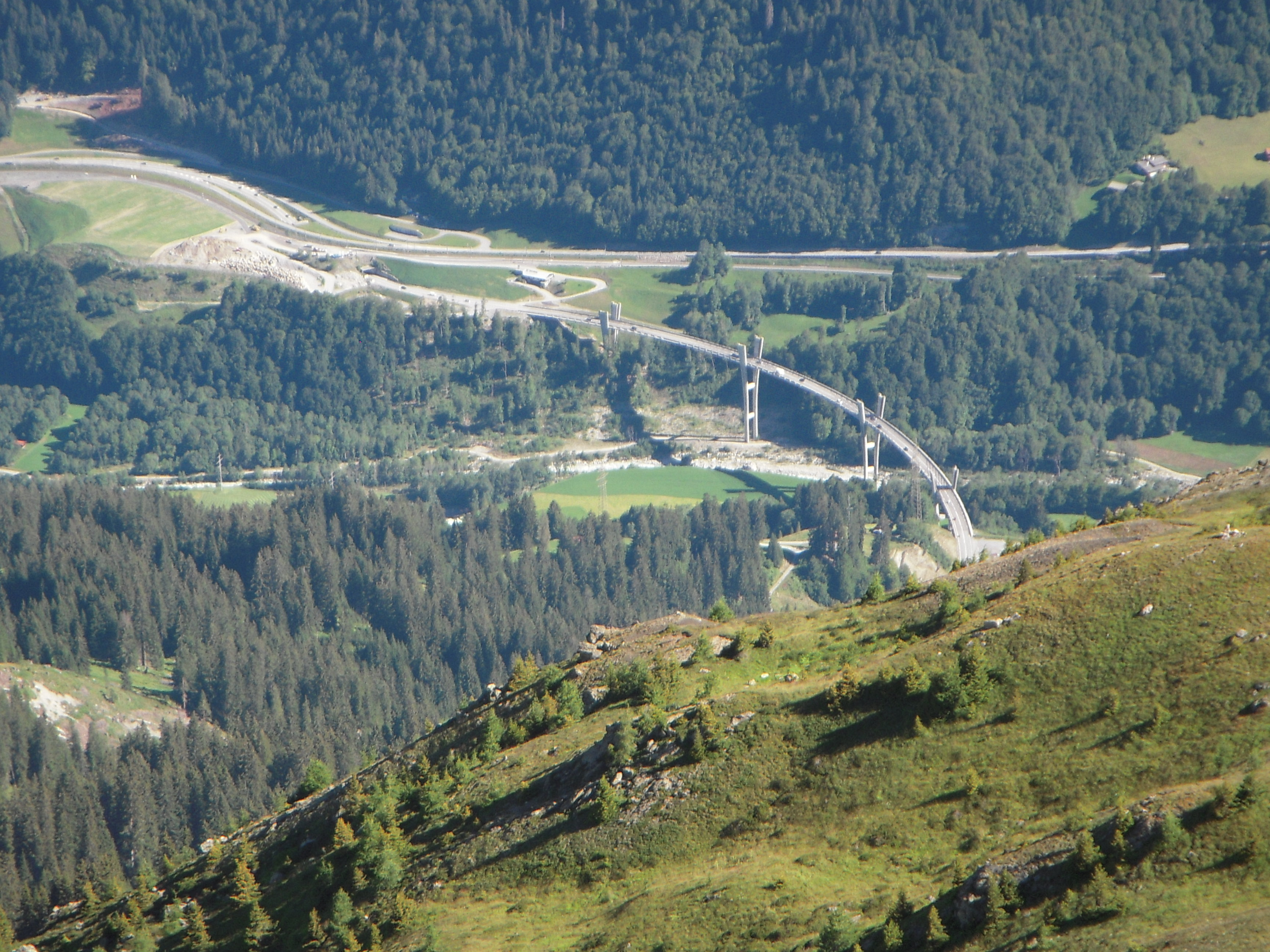
View from above Gotschna Tunnel looking north: Sunniberg Bridge and its four pylons P1, P2, P3, P4 (left to right). The Landquart–Davos Platz railway line runs across the top of the picture.

The Klosters bypass highway crosses the Landquart River valley on a 526 m (1,726 ft) long curving road bridge (horizontal radius of curvature about 500m) at a height of between 50 and 60m above the valley floor. Four slender H-shape piers rise up from the valley floor (8.80m × 4.25m at the base), like the tall trees nearby. Proceeding upwards, the arms of the tall piers/pylons flare out to subtend and sustain the 12.4 m (41 ft) wide curved and banked deck, nestling the roadway in their arms.

The bridge received the Outstanding Structure Award in 2001 for being "a delicate expression of structural art responding to a sensitive landscape.".

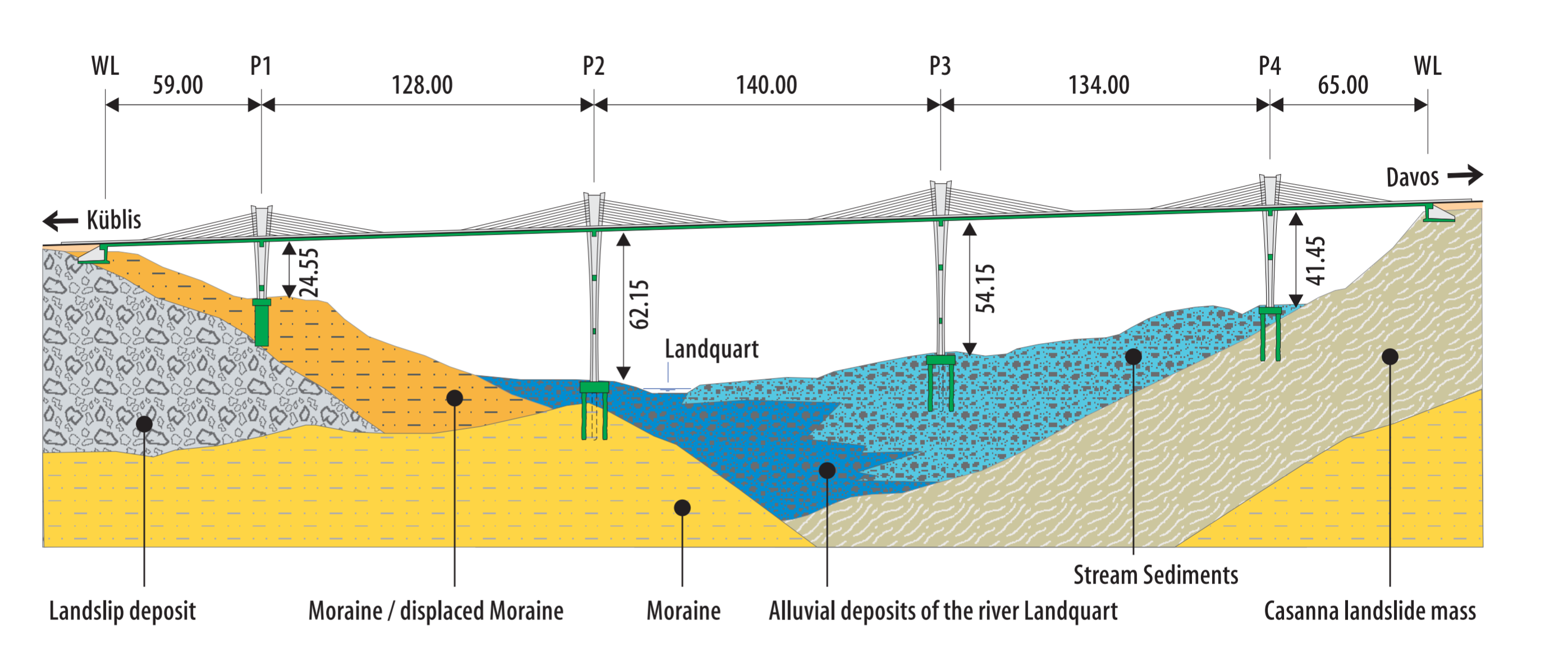
Sunniberg Bridge elevation with geology, from Tiefbauamt Graubünden (1998)

== Construction ==
Construction started Spring 1996, by Batigroup AG and Vetsch AG, starting at the north end with pier P1, the pier closest to the Landquart to Klosters road. Once the piers were completed, the deck were erected using the balanced cantilever method. The bridge was completed ahead of schedule in Fall 1998.

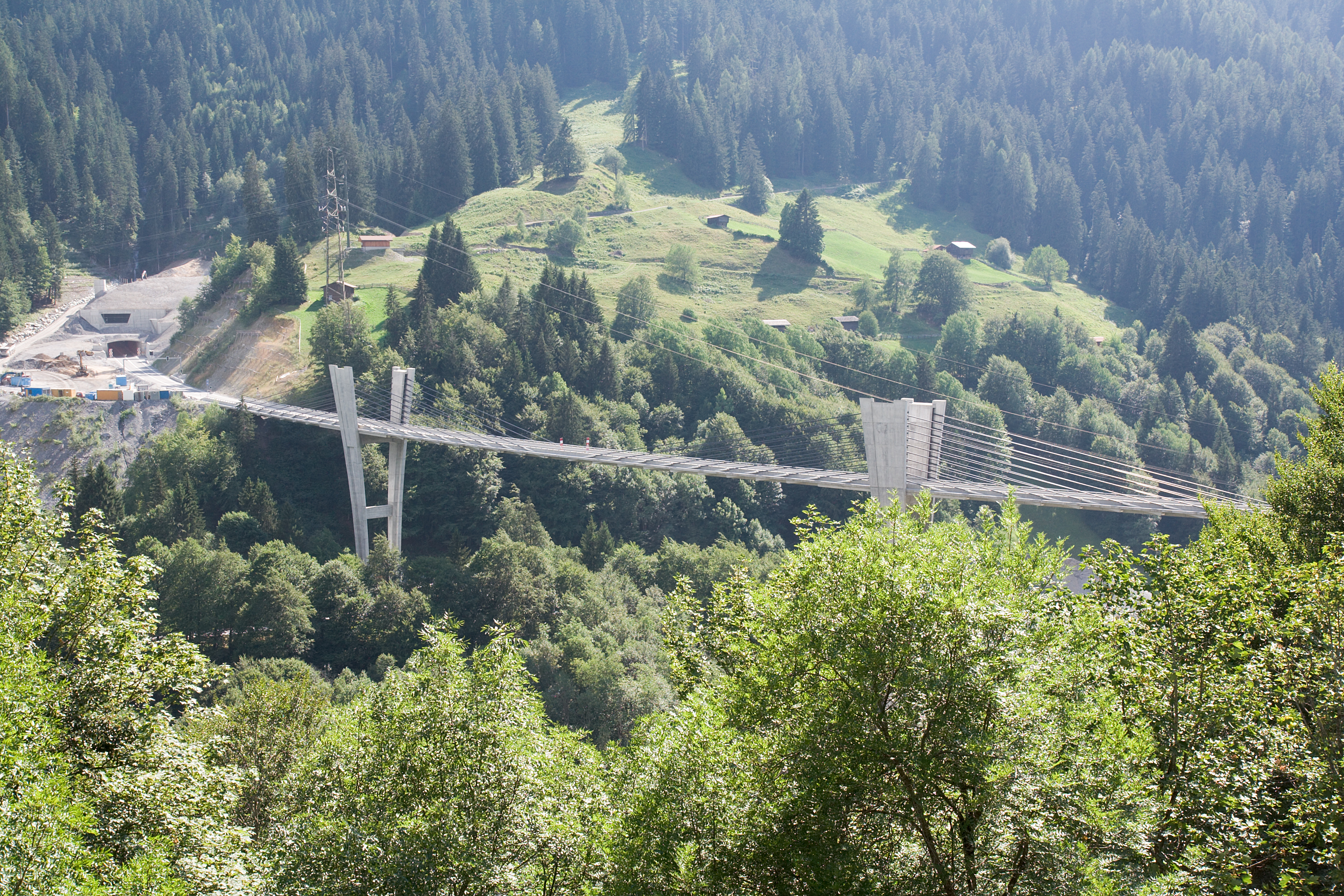
View looking south: northern portal of the Gotschna Tunnel to Klosters and Davos (far left), Sunniberg Bridge and pylons P4, P3 (right)

The completed bridge was not opened for traffic because the Gotschna Tunnel, to which the south end of the bridge was connected, was still under construction. Instead, it was used only to access the excavation sites for the tunnel in the interim, until 2005 when the Klosters bypass, including both the bridge and the tunnel, was opened for traffic in a ceremony with Prince Charles, a frequent visitor to Klosters.

== Critique ==
In the 2009 International Award of Merit to engineer/designer Christian Menn, his Sunniberg Bridge, along with his Ganter Bridge, his Leonard P. Zakim Bunker Hill Memorial Bridge as well as others, were singled out as being renown "worldwide for their structural beauty, economic efficiency, technical innovation, and for simply being structural engineering oeuvres of art."

From a 2015 Structural Engineering International retrospective, "The Impact of the Sunniberg Bridge on Structural Engineering, Switzerland", the following points can be made about the impact of the Sunniberg Bridge:

- It was a favorite among structural engineers, ranked no. 5 among most favorite structure published from 1991 to 2000.
- It helped establish "extradosed bridge" as a new and distinct bridge type.
- It is a curved multi-span extradosed road bridge, which is uncommon.
- It is an integral bridge, i.e., it has neither joints nor bearings at their ends, but the girder is rigidly connected to the abutments; thus it is easier to maintain.
- It shows that concrete can be used to build slender structures with elegance.

The Sunniberg Bridge has become an icon of Swiss engineering, standing for high performance, quality and elegance, perception of structural engineering, an object inspiring admiration,...

== Gallery ==
The four piers/pylons of Sunniberg Bridge are numbered from north to south as P1 to P4.

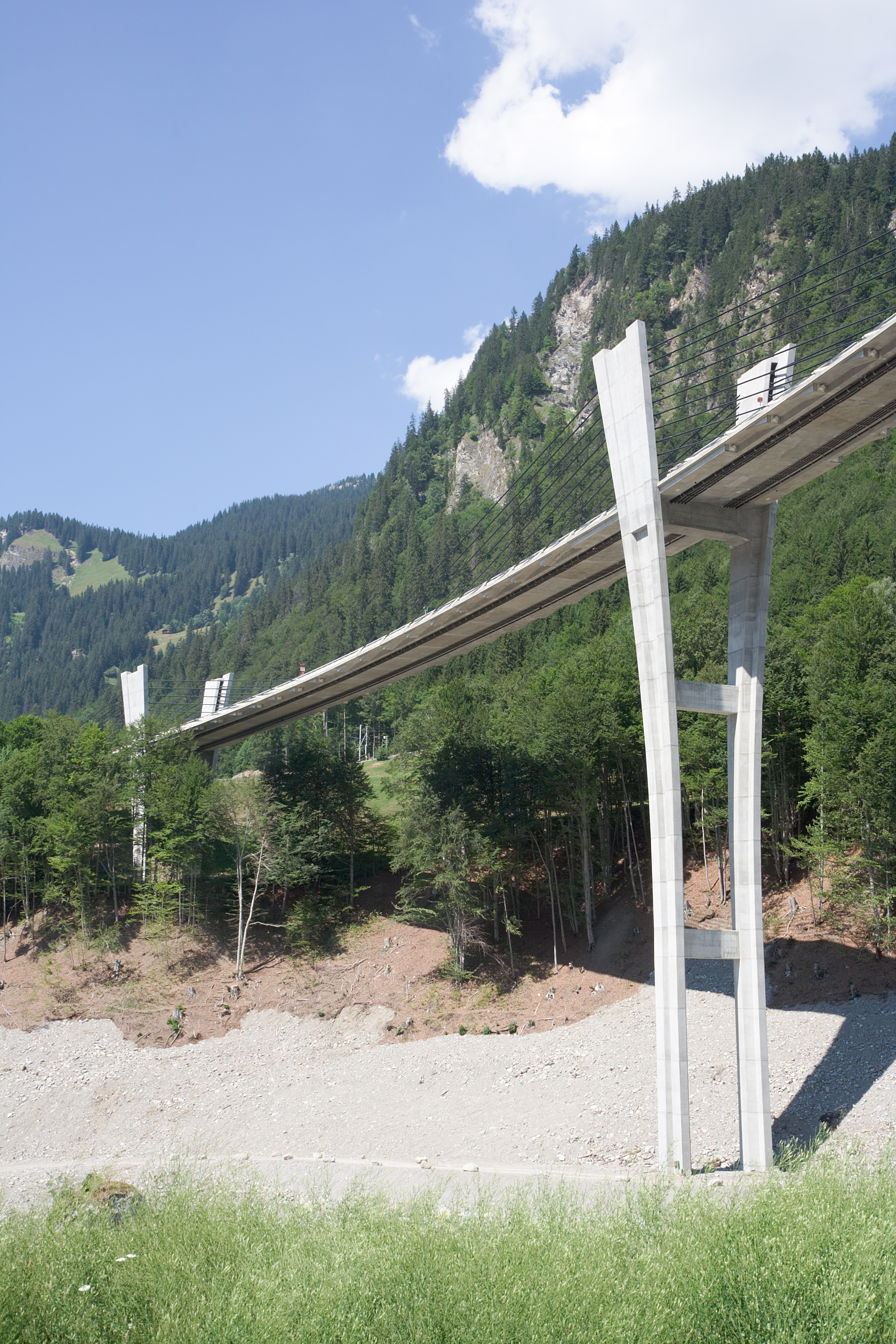
From river level looking north: pylons P1 and P2 (right)

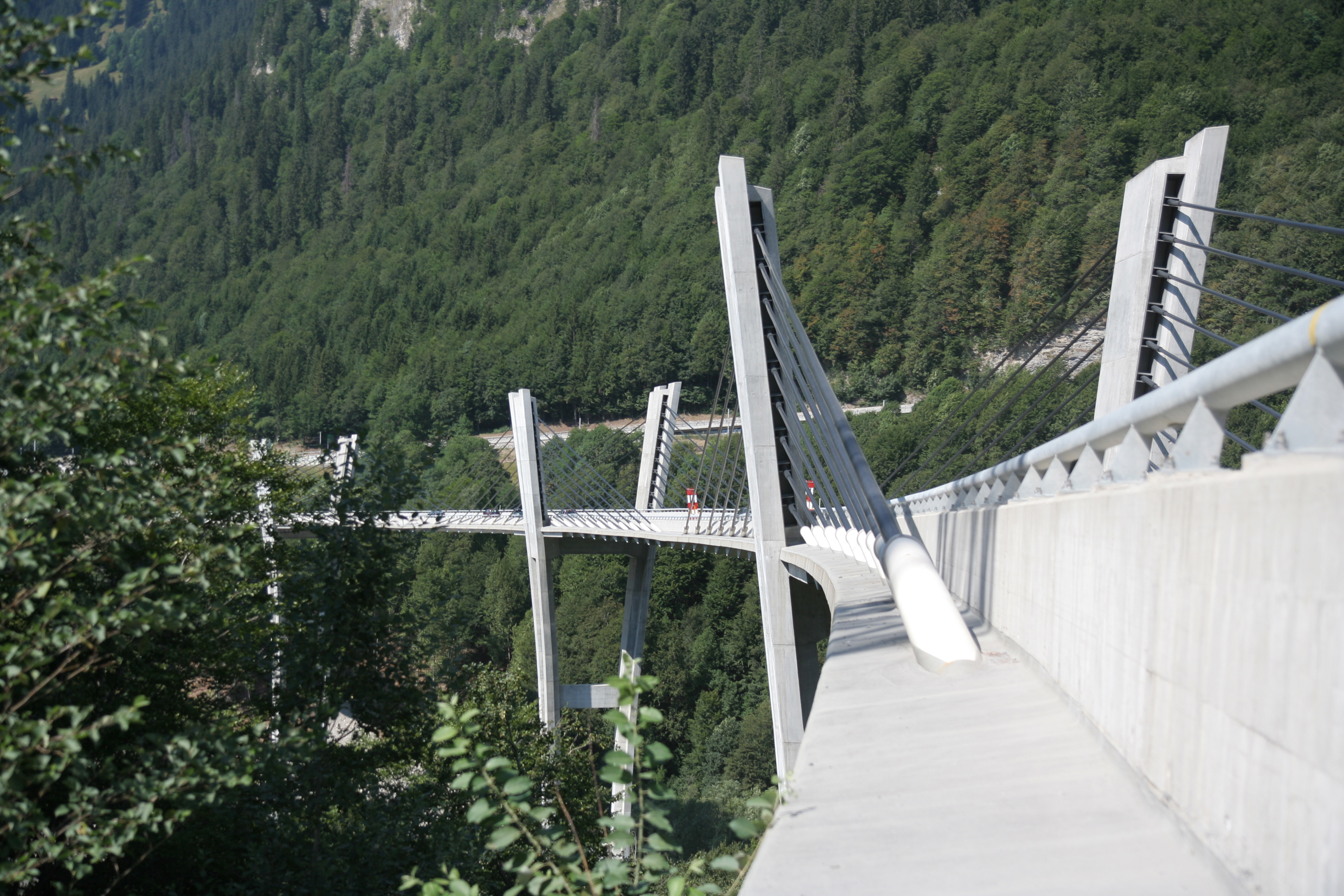
From south abutment looking north: pylons P2, P3, and P4 (right)

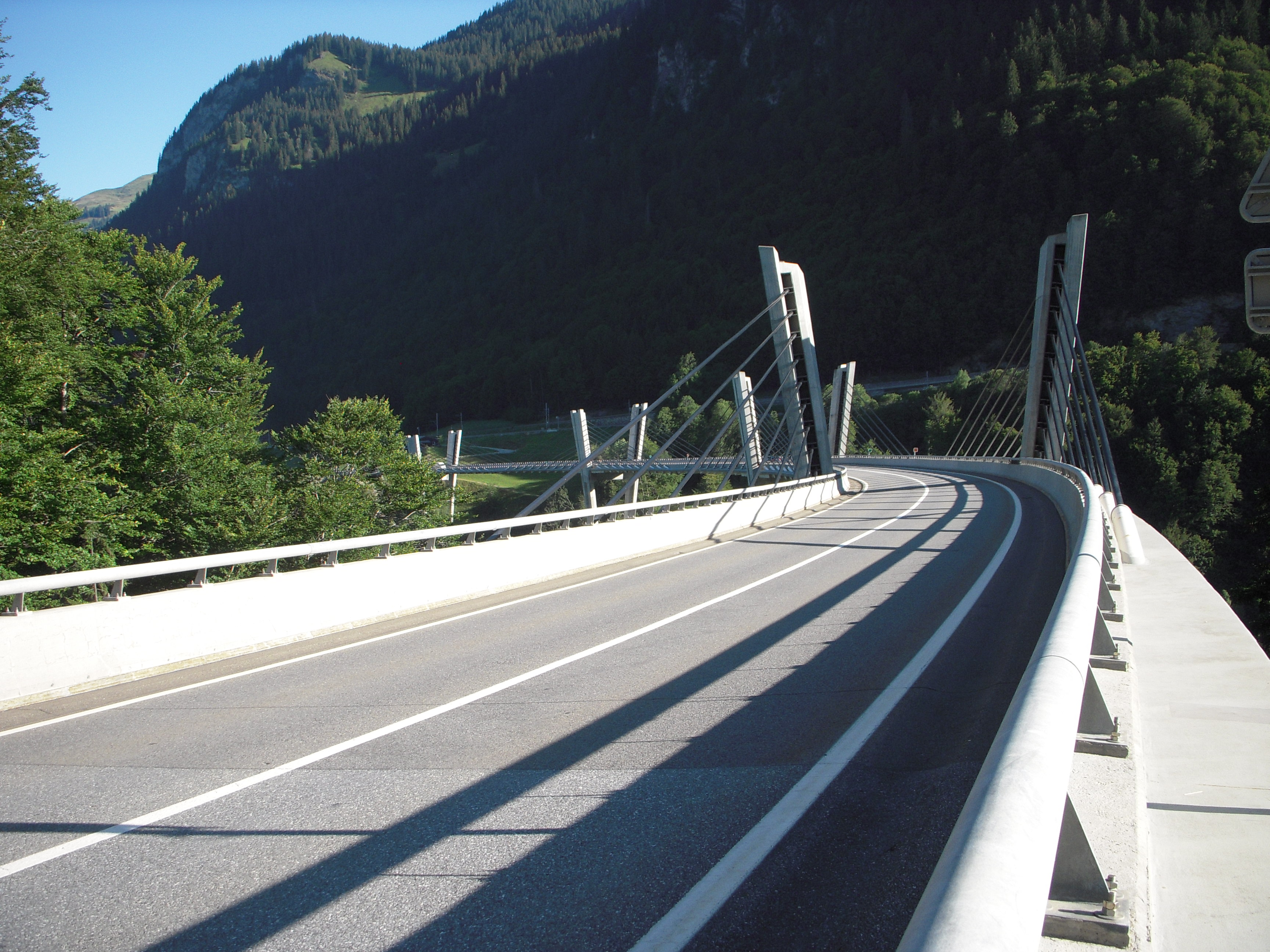
From south abutment looking north: pylons P1 (left), P2, P3, and P4 (closest)

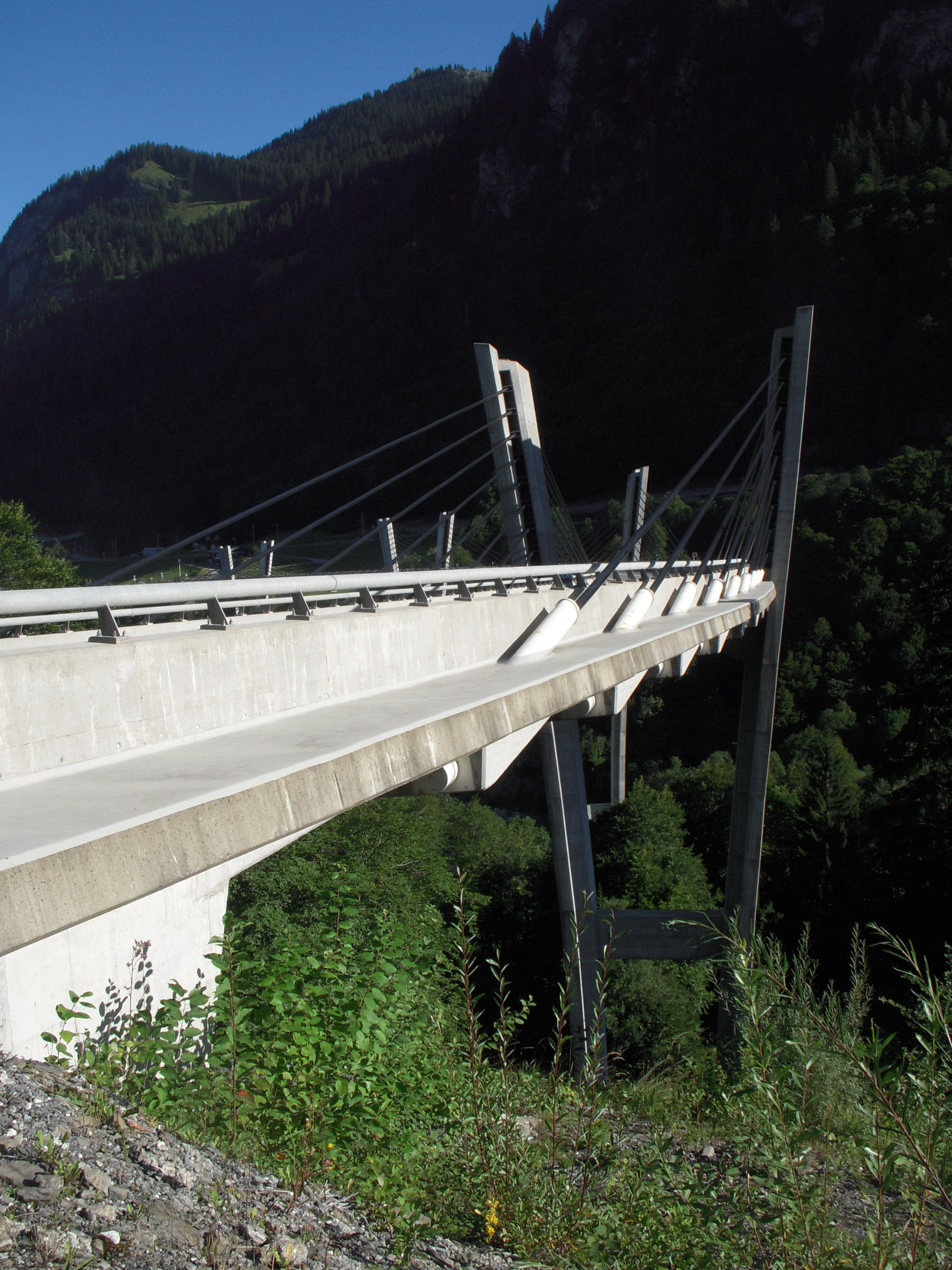
From south abutment looking north: P4 cable anchors on roadway east edge

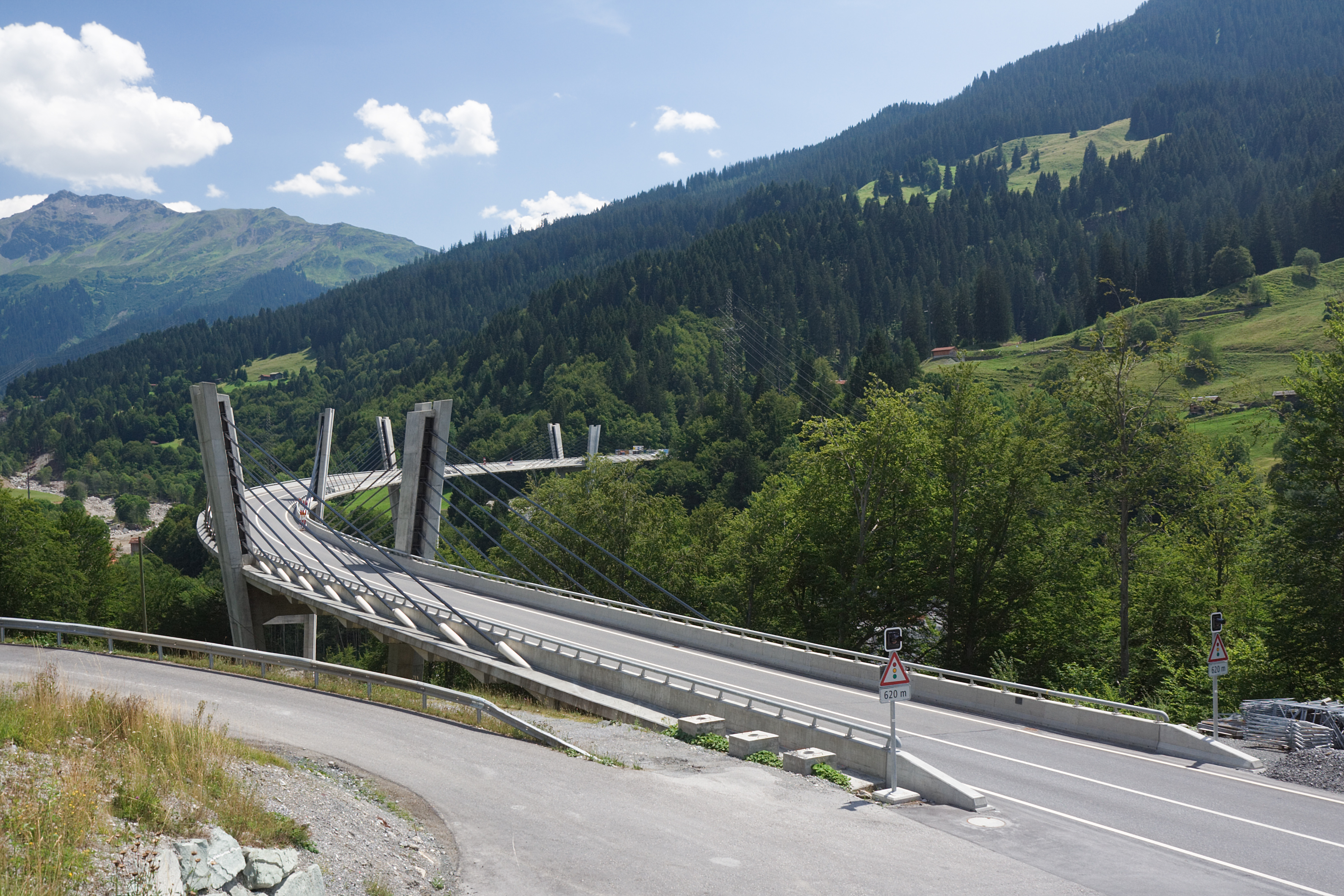
From north abutment looking south east: pylons P1 (closest), P2, P3, and P4

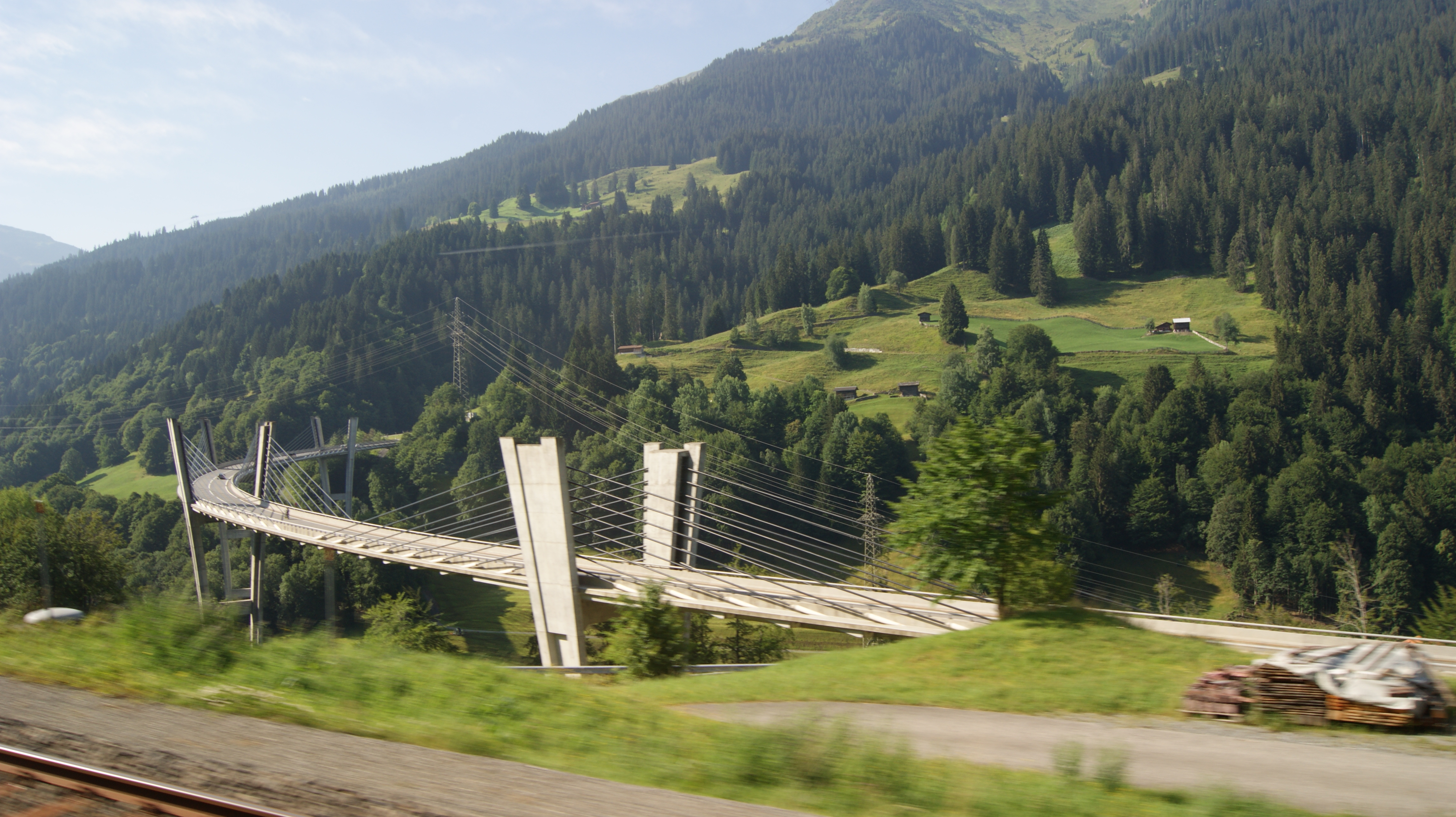
From train east of the north abutment looking south: pylons P2 and P1 (center)

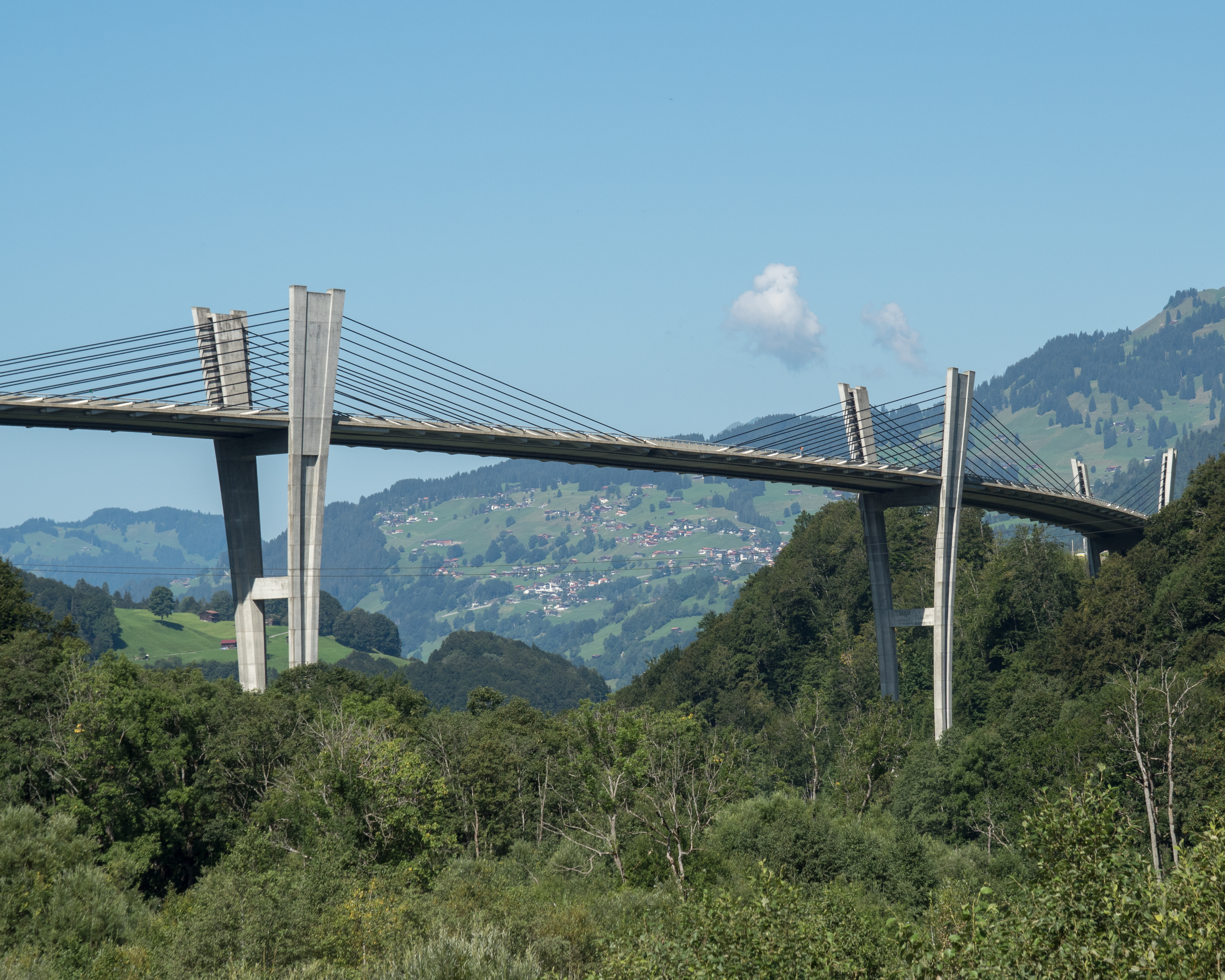
From valley level looking west: pylons P3 (left), P2, and P1

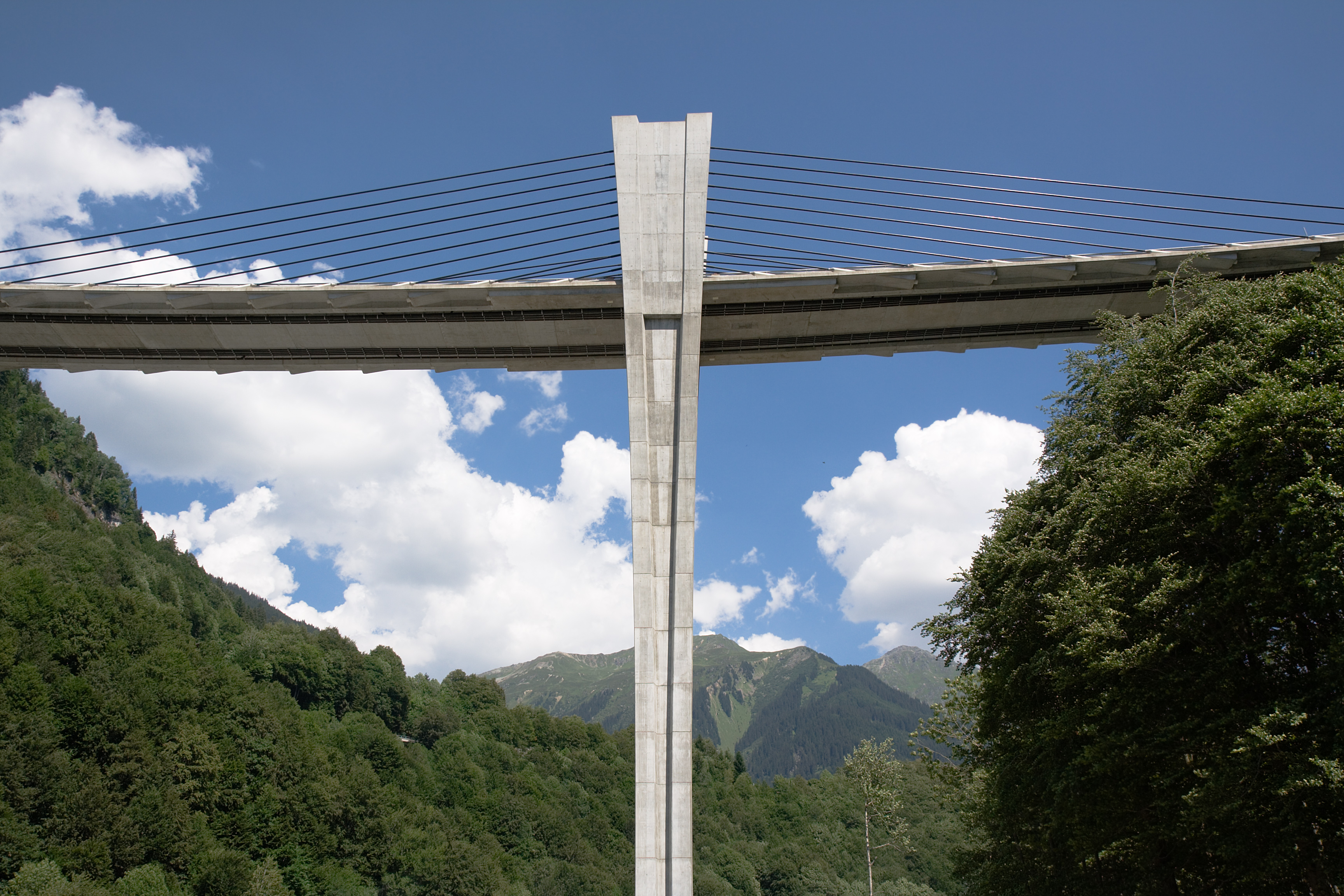
From valley level looking east: pylon P3

== See also ==
- Landquart–Davos Platz railway, regional train line that passes above the north abutment of the Sunniberg Bridge
- Ganter Bridge, designed by Christian Menn and completed 1980 in Switzerland
- Leonard P. Zakim Bunker Hill Memorial Bridge, designed by Christian Menn and completed 2003 in Boston, USA
