= K13 Harpe Bru Bridge =

Bridge in Norway

Coordinates: 61°34′06″N 9°52′25″E

K13 Harpe Bru Bridge is the first extradosed cable-stayed bridge in Norway.

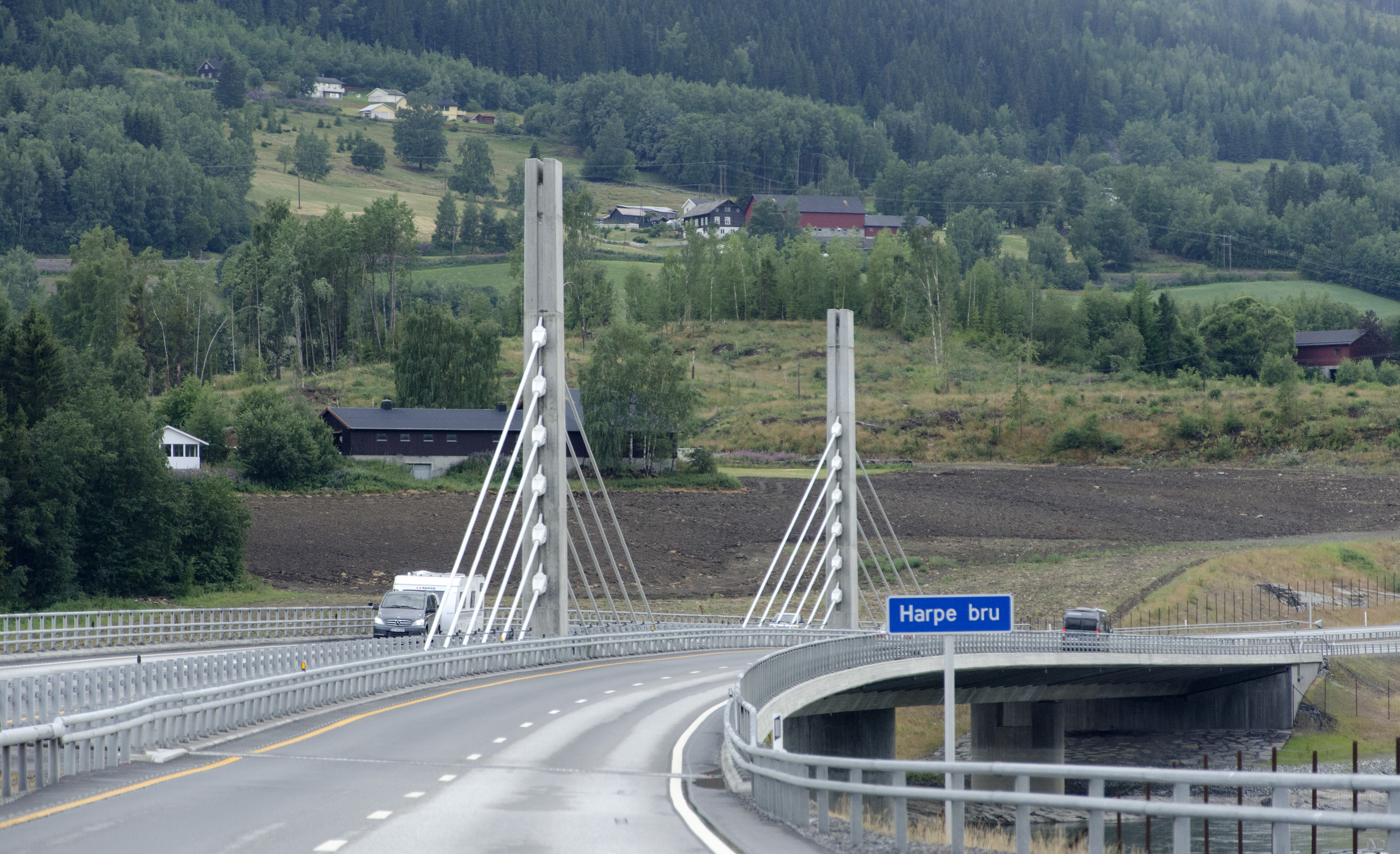
Bridge towers

Technical information:

- Extradosed Stay Cable Bridge (Length 320m)
- spans 45+65+100+65+45m
- foundations – piles/flat (founded on rock)
- pylons height 16,0m

Owner:

- Statens Vegvesen

Design:

- Johs Holt AS

Checking engineering:

- COWI AS

Contractor:

- Implenia Construction SA

Completion: October 2015
