= Stuag =

Swiss road construction company

- Formerly: Schweizerische Strassenbau- und Tiefbau-Unternehmung AG (1913–1944)
- Company type: Joint-stock company
- Industry: Construction
- Founded: 1912 in Solothurn, Switzerland
- Fate: Merged into Batigroup (1997), later Implenia
- Headquarters: Solothurn (1912–1917); Bern (1917–1990); Zug (1991–1997)
- Products: Road and civil engineering construction
- Number of employees: 2,458 (1997)

Stuag was a Swiss road construction company. Founded in 1912, it expanded across Switzerland over the 20th century before merging into Batigroup in 1997, which later became Implenia.

== History ==
In 1912 five businessmen and politicians from Solothurn and Langenthal founded a joint-stock company for the construction of dust-free roads. From 1913 it was called Schweizerische Strassenbau- und Tiefbau-Unternehmung AG, and from 1944 Stuag. It had its seat in Solothurn (1912–1917), then in Bern (1917–1990) and in Zug (1991–1997).

Stuag benefited from public investment in road construction and gradually spread across Switzerland by setting up branches and taking over other companies. From 1928 to 1935 it had subsidiaries in Austria, Hungary, and Czechoslovakia. During the Second World War it also built military roads, and from 1945 it took part in the construction of the national highways.

In 1987 it employed more than 2,000 people at some sixty sites. In 1997 it merged with the firms Schmalz and Preiswerk to create Batigroup, which in turn joined with the Geneva firm Zschokke in 2006 to become Implenia.

In 1997 its turnover reached 398 million francs with a workforce of 2,458 employees.

== Bibliography ==
- 50 Jahre Stuag, 1962
- 75 Jahre Stuag, 1987
