= Hotel 2 Fevrier Lomé =

Hôtel 2 Février

- Location within Togo

General information
- Type: hotel
- Location: Place De L'Indépendance, Lomé, Togo
- Coordinates: 6.127645°N 1.214083°E
- Completed: 1980
- Renovated: 2016

Height
- Height: 102 m (335 ft)

Technical details
- Floor count: 36

The Hôtel 2 Février is a 102m, 36-story hotel in Lomé, Togo on Place De L'Indépendance street, opened in 1980. It is the tallest building in Togo. Because it is the only high-rise in Lomé (and in Togo), it is visible from just about anywhere in the city.

The hotel was constructed at a cost of 35 billion West African CFA francs and opened in June 1980 by Togolese President Gnassingbé Eyadéma. It was named for the date, February 2, 1974, on which he nationalized the country's phosphate mines, following his survival of the 1974 Togo presidential C-47 crash. The hotel was originally managed by Sofitel as Hotel Sofitel du 2 Février

The hotel closed in 2000 and in February of that year, the government of Togo was loaned $20 million to renovate the property by the Libyan African Investment Company (LAICO). On May 8, 2002, Malta-based Corinthia Hotels International was signed to manage the property after its intended renovation. The shuttered hotel was sold outright to LAICO in 2006, in exchange for forgiveness of the loan and a promise to renovate the hotel. When LAICO had not carried out the renovations after 8 years, the hotel was nationalized by the Togolese government on November 10, 2014 and renovations were begun.

While the hotel was being renovated, the Carlson Rezidor group assumed management on February 26, 2015. The hotel reopened in April 2016 as the Radisson Blu Hotel du 2 Février. Radisson ceased managing the hotel in August 2017 and it became the Hotel 2 Février. On June 27, 2018, it was announced that the hotel would be managed by Emaar Hospitality, a division of UAE-based Emaar Properties. The hotel was to be operated under their Address Hotels brand as Address Hotel 2 Février Lomé Togo. This never occurred, and as of 2026 the hotel remains independently operated.
