= Ganter Bridge =

Road bridge in the canton of Valais, Switzerland

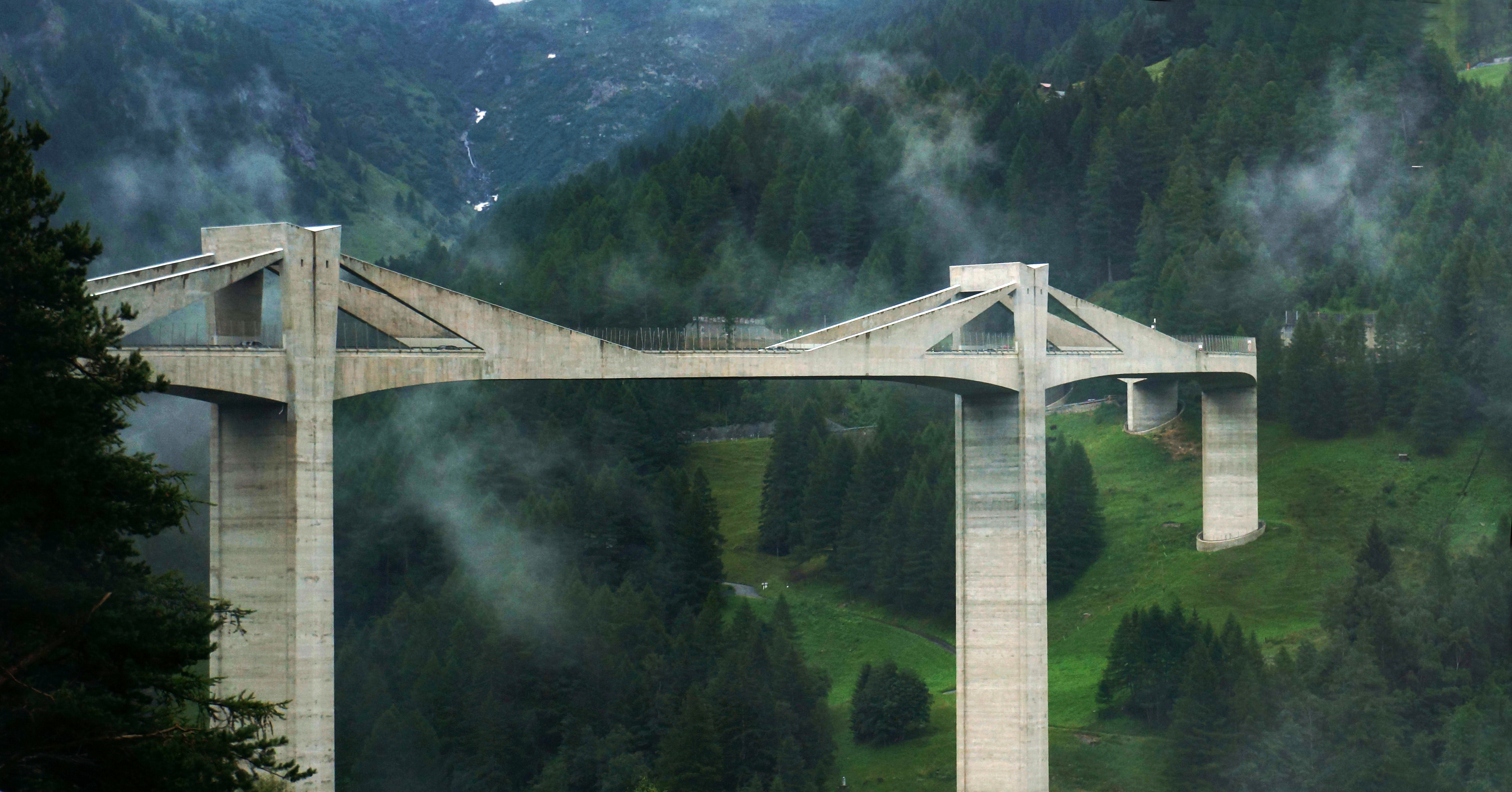
- Coordinates: 46.296372°N 8.050861°E
- Crosses: Ganter Valley
- Locale: Valais, Switzerland

Characteristics
- Design: cable-stayed bridge and prestressed cantilever girder bridge
- Material: Reinforced concrete
- Total length: 678 m (2,224 ft)
- Height: 150 m (492 ft)
- Longest span: 174 m (571 ft)
- No. of spans: 8

History
- Designer: Christian Menn
- Construction start: 1976
- Construction end: 1980
- Construction cost: SFr 23.5 million

Location
- Interactive map of Ganter Bridge

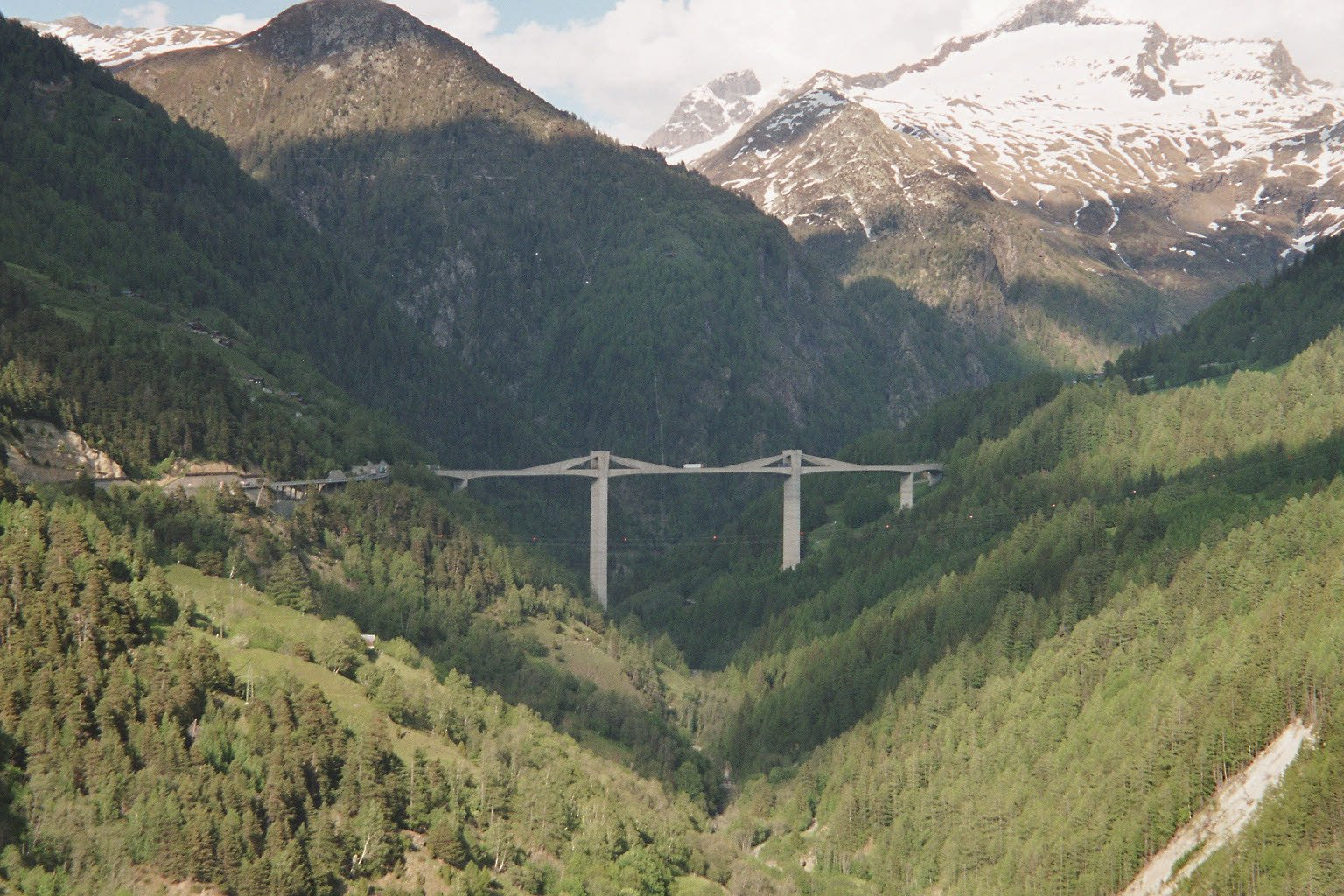
Profile of Ganter Bridge crossing the Ganter river valley

Ganter Bridge is a multi-span reinforced-concrete road bridge that is the second longest spanning bridge in Switzerland after Poya Bridge. It spans the Ganter River valley and is located along the Simplon Pass road about 10 km (6 mi) south of Brig in the canton of Valais, Switzerland. It was designed by renowned Swiss civil engineer Christian Menn and completed in 1980. It is notable for its innovative design and its stylish geometric profile in its spectacular Alpine setting.

== Design ==
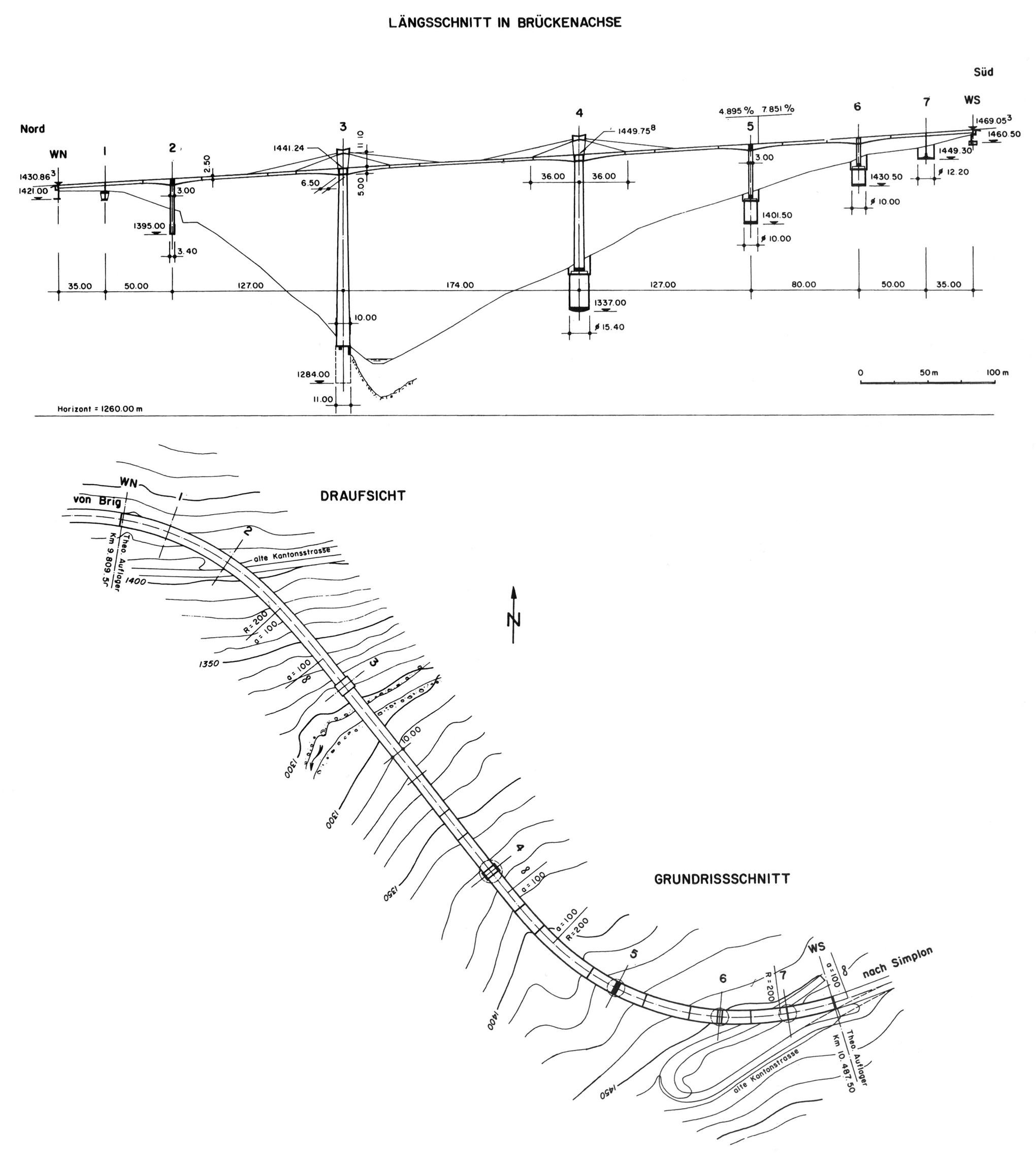
Ganter Bridge: elevation (top) and plan (bottom)

The bridge's form consists of an S-curve roadway, high above the Ganter River and at about 1,450 m (4,760 ft) above sea level, supported by two main towers and five smaller piers. They sustain a total of eight spans with lengths of, from north to south, respectively: 35 m (115 ft), 50 m (164 ft), 127 m (417 ft), 174 m (571 ft), 127 m (417 ft), 80 m (262 ft), 50 m (164 ft), and 35 m (115 ft). The main and longest span between the two towers, P3 and P4, is straight, while most of the remaining spans lie along curves with a radius of 200 m (656 ft). The overall length is 678 m (2,224 ft) with a main span of 174 m (571 ft), and a maximum tower height of 150 m (492 ft).

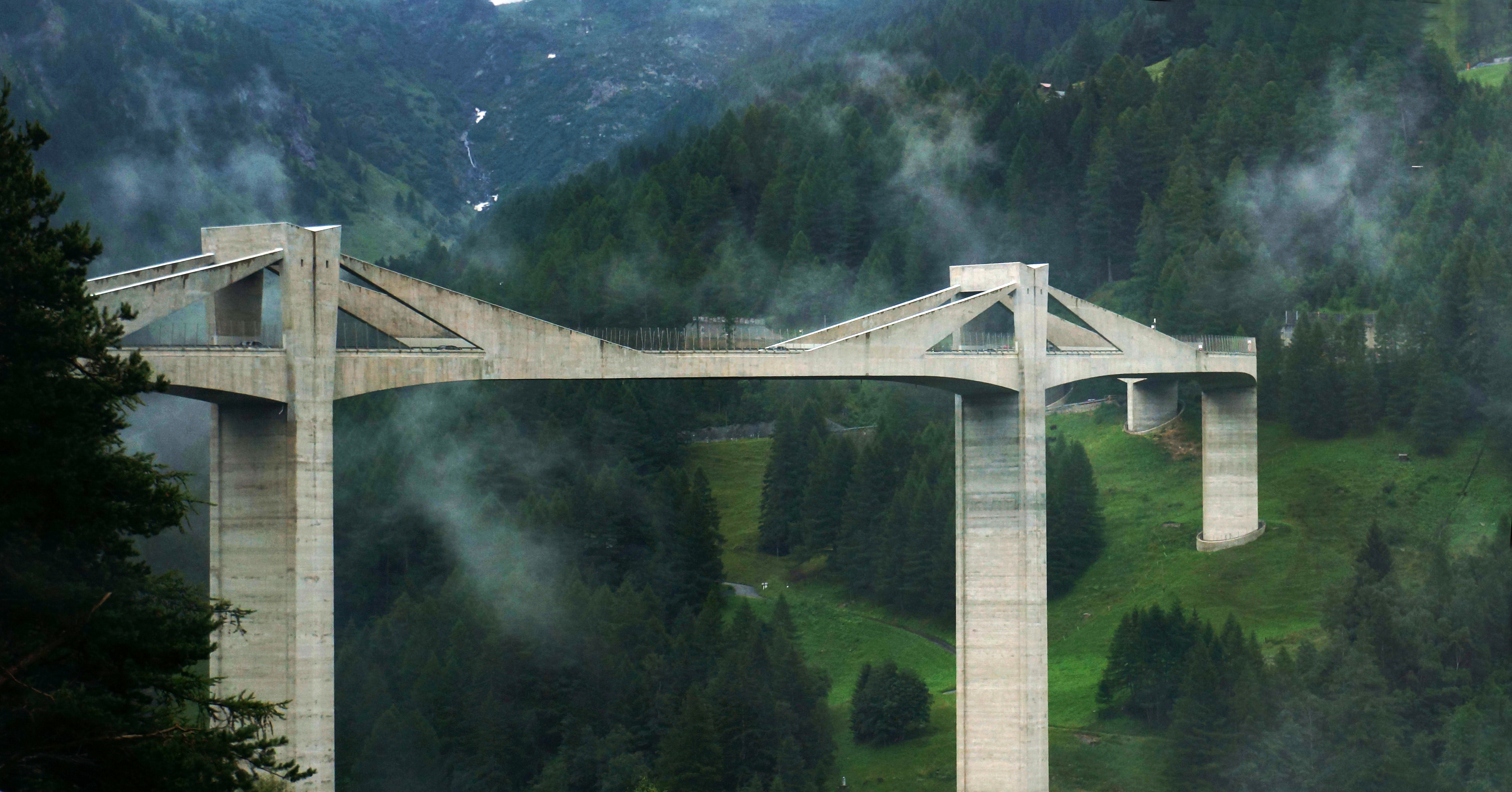
Ganter Bridge: concrete sails and walls across tower tops

Its innovative design combines elements of a cable-stayed bridge and a prestressed cantilever hollow-box girder bridge, which has become to be referred to as an extradosed bridge. The Ganter Bridge is the first of its type to use triangular concrete walls above the roadway to encase the prestressed cable-stays into sails, which protects the cables from corrosion and gives the bridge a distinctive stylish geometric appearance. From some drivers' view, these triangular concrete walls plus the one across the top of the towers made the main span feel too much like a tunnel entrance. Whatever its pros and cons, the innovative and unique Ganter Bridge is one of Switzerland's ground-breaking bridges. In the words of David P. Billington: “Ganter bridge ... represents one of those rare events where a new form arises”.

== Construction ==
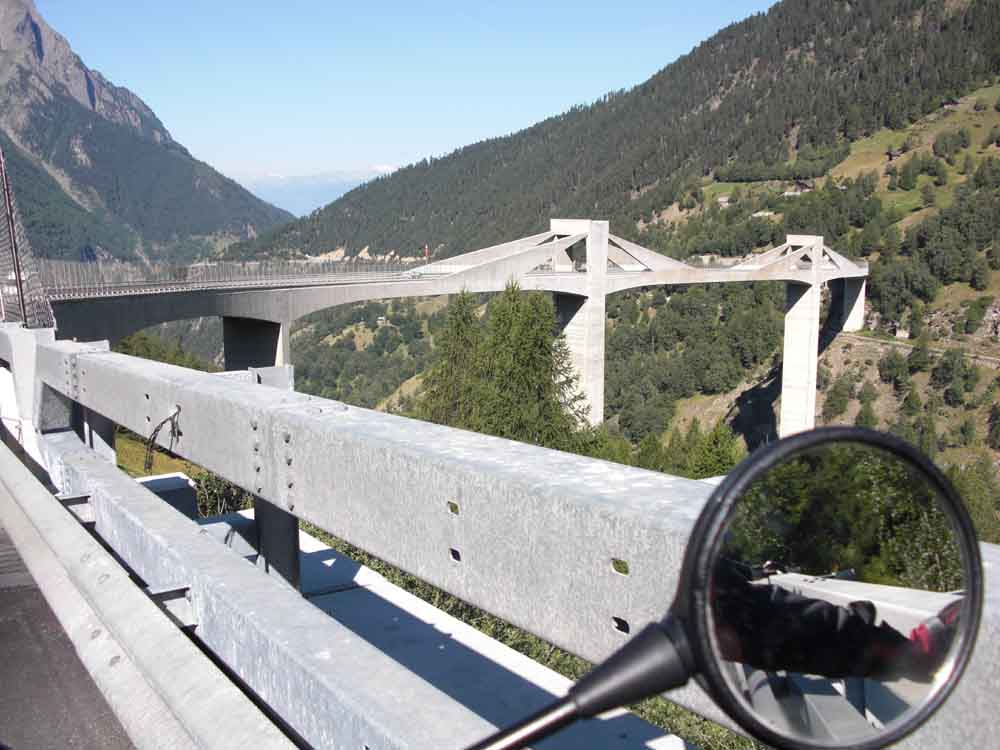
Approaching Ganter Bridge from the south side

Construction began in 1976. The locations of the piers were based on geological conditions as well as symmetry and uniformity of span lengths. The shaft for pier P4 was approximately 40m deep. The south valley side was susceptible to creep movement, so the feet of the south valley piers P4 to P7 were mounted on pot bearings and regularly monitored. After the piers were complete, the balanced free cantilever construction method was employed. By autumn 1979, the entire substructure and approximately 60% of superstructure were complete. By December 1980 the construction was completed on schedule.

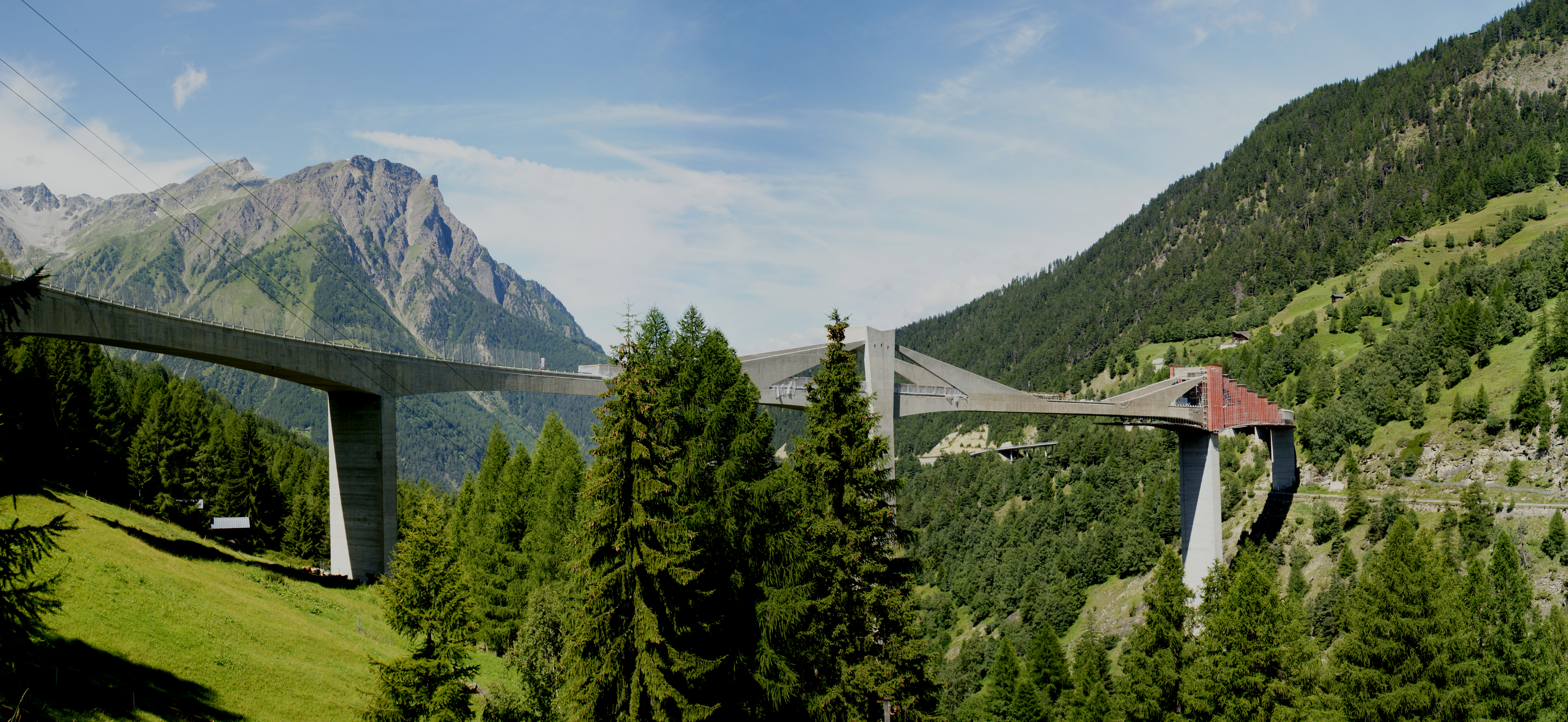
Ganter Bridge under rehabilitation (2008)

Between 2006 and 2008 the Ganter Bridge was given a complete rehabilitation as the piers on the south side of the bridge had shifted 105mm southward. Measures were taken to address further movement of the south side piers.

== Bibliography ==
- Billington, David P. The Tower and the Bridge. Princeton University Press, Princeton, USA, 1983. ISBN 0-691-02393-X
- Billington, David P. The Art of Structural Design: A Swiss Legacy. Princeton University Art Museum. Princeton, USA, 2003. ISBN 0-300-09786-7.
