= Christian Menn =

Swiss civil engineer and bridge designer

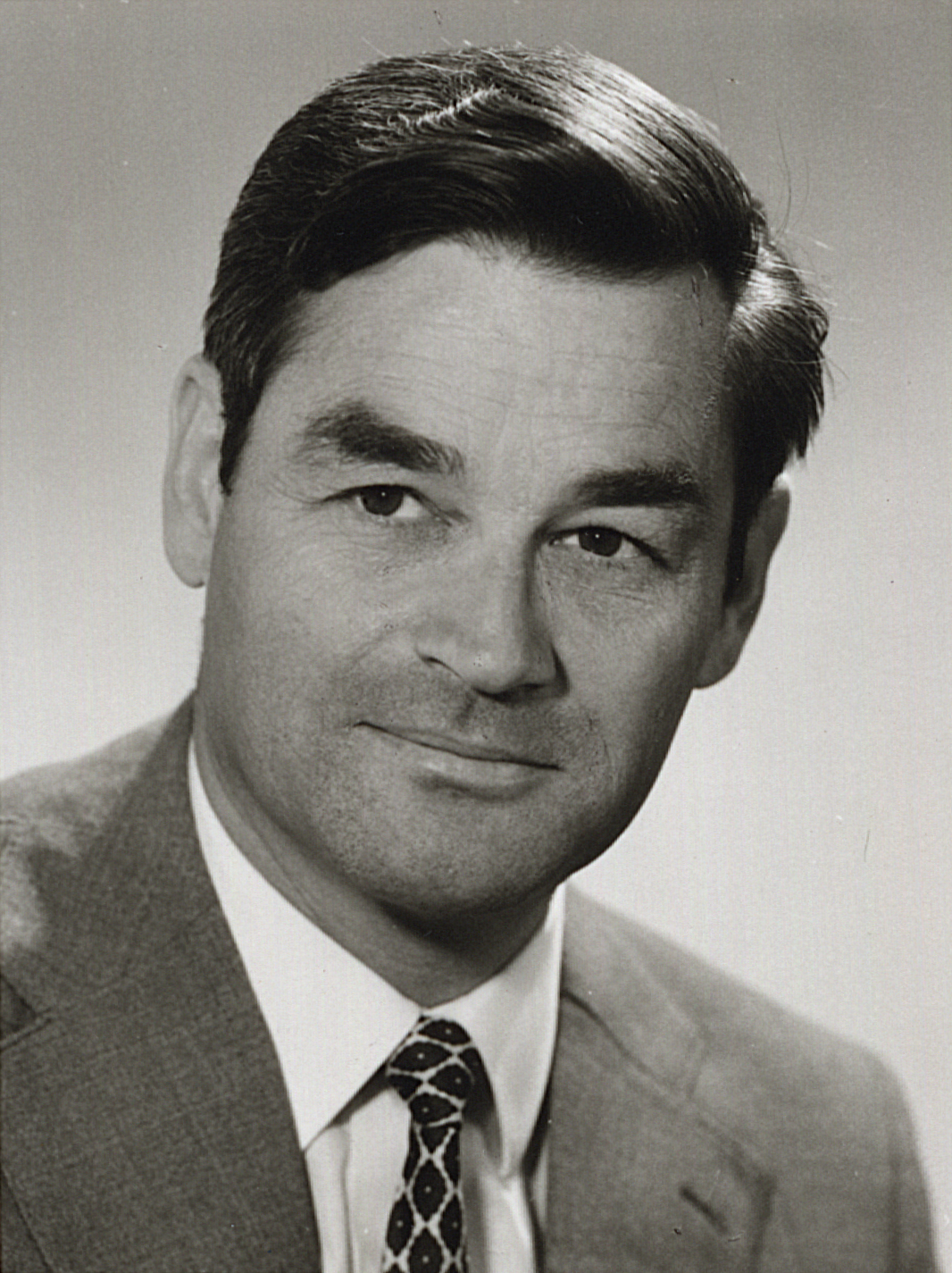
ETH Library: Christian Menn (circa 1970)

Christian Menn (March 3, 1927 – July 16, 2018) was a renowned Swiss civil engineer and bridge designer. He was involved in the construction of around 100 bridges worldwide, but the focus of his work was in eastern Switzerland, especially in canton Graubünden. He continued the tradition of and had a decisive influence on Swiss bridge building. The technical and aesthetic possibilities of prestressed concrete were most fully realized with his bridges in Switzerland.

Menn led his own engineering company in Chur from 1957 to 1971. From 1971 until his retirement in 1992, he was a professor of structural engineering at ETH Zurich, specializing in bridge design. In his retirement years, he continued to be a consulting engineer in private practice.

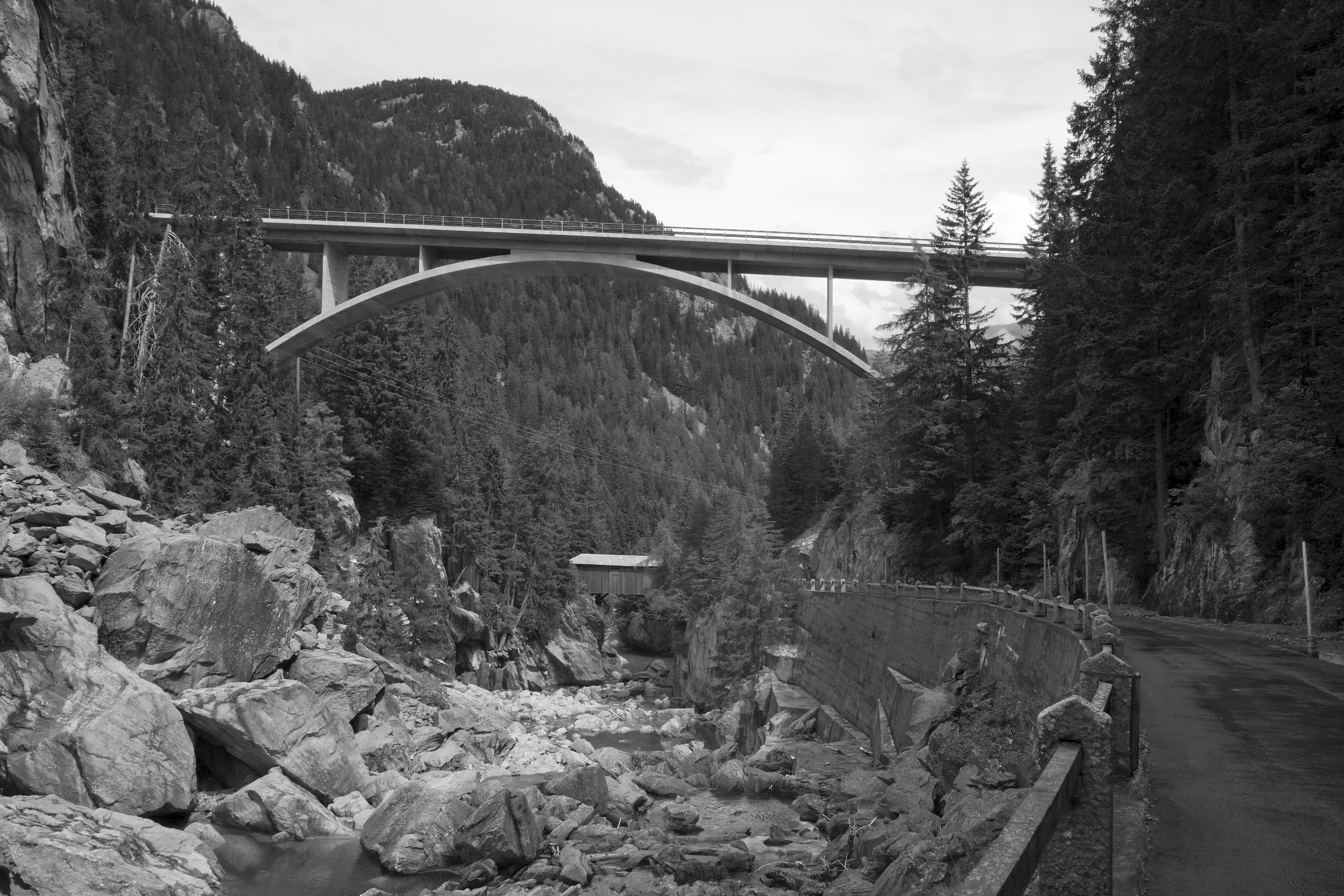
Crestawald bridge (1959), Grisons canton, Switzerland

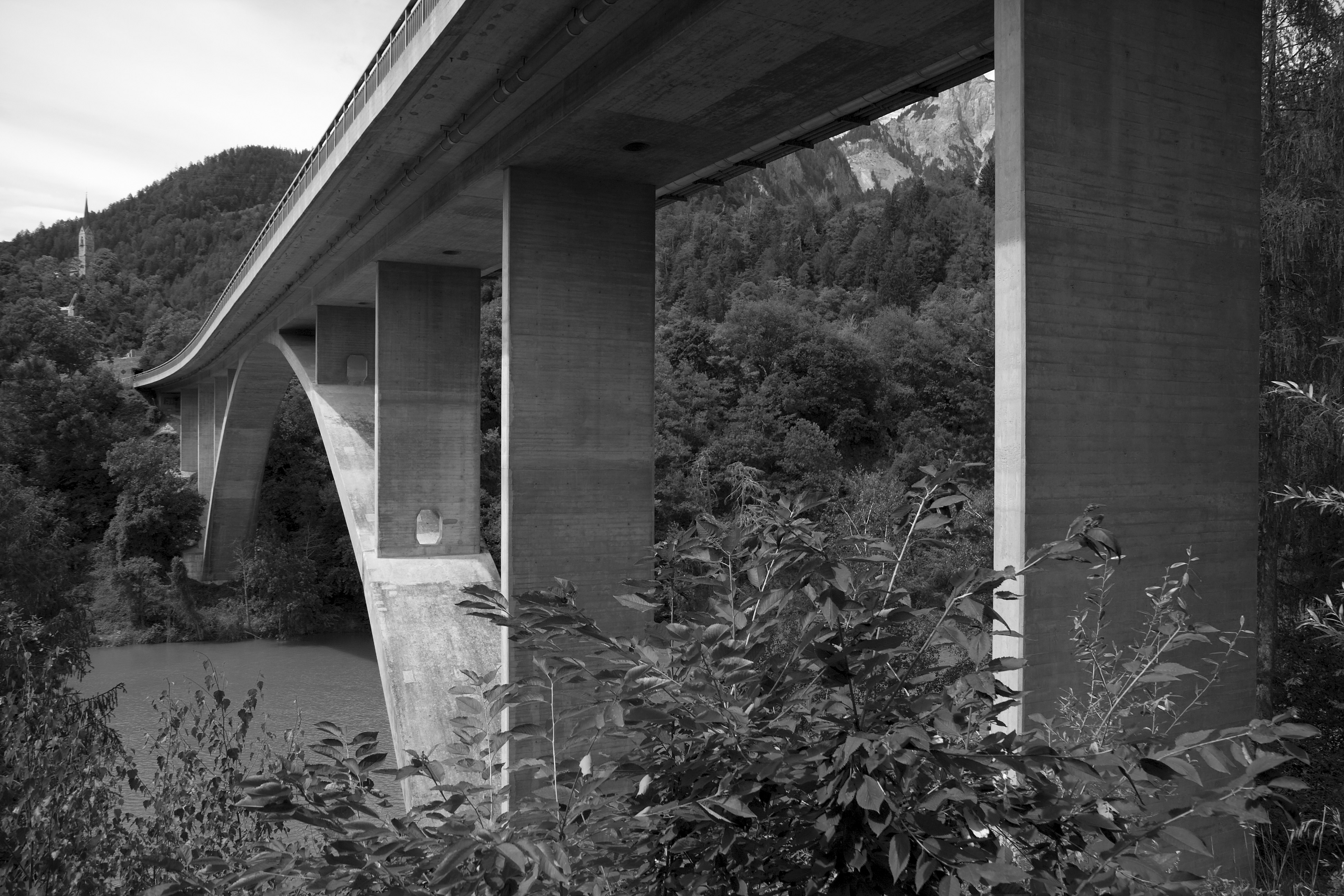
Rhine Bridge Tamins (1962), Tamins, Domat/Ems, Switzerland

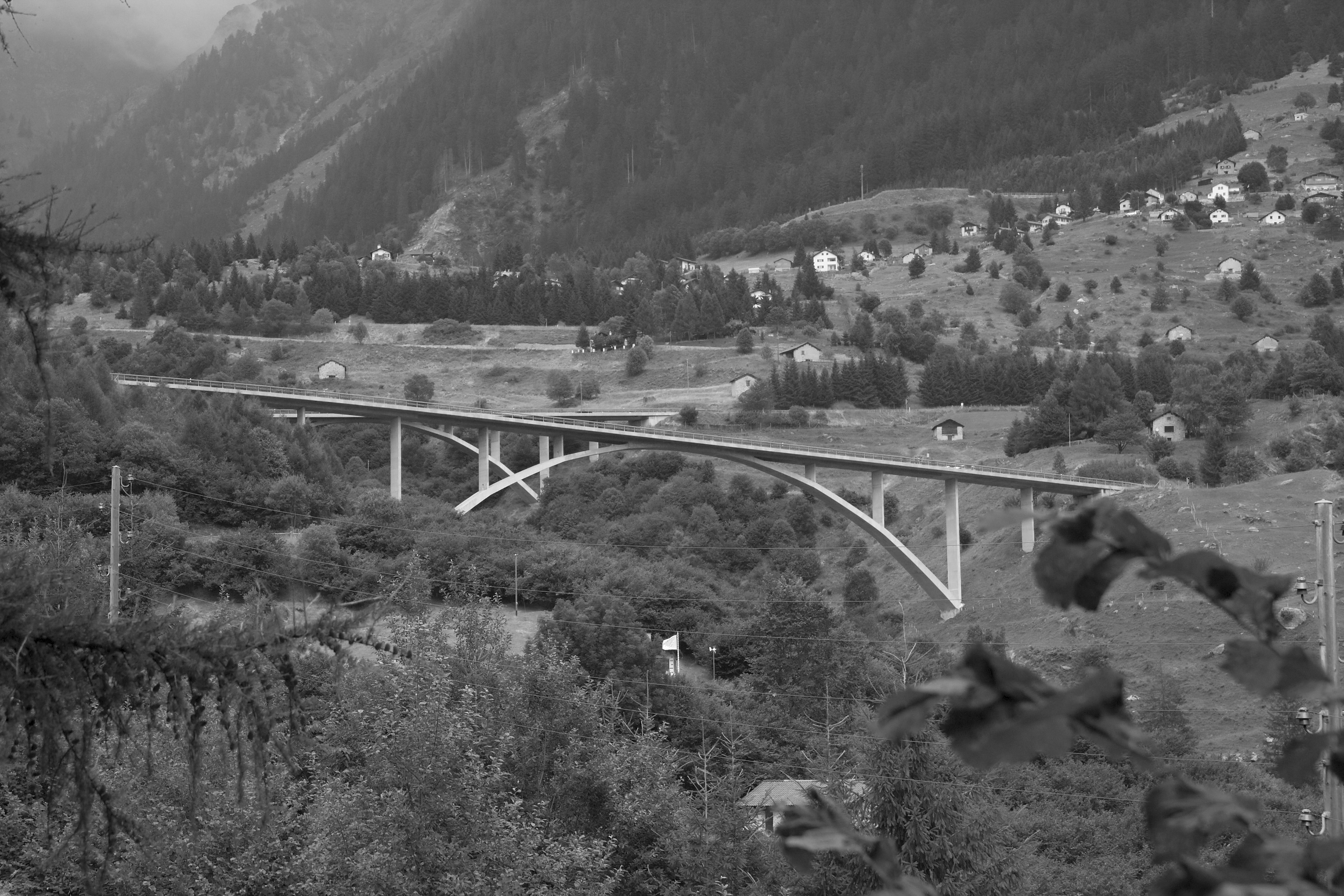
Mesocco bridges (1967), Moesa Region, Grisons, Switzerland

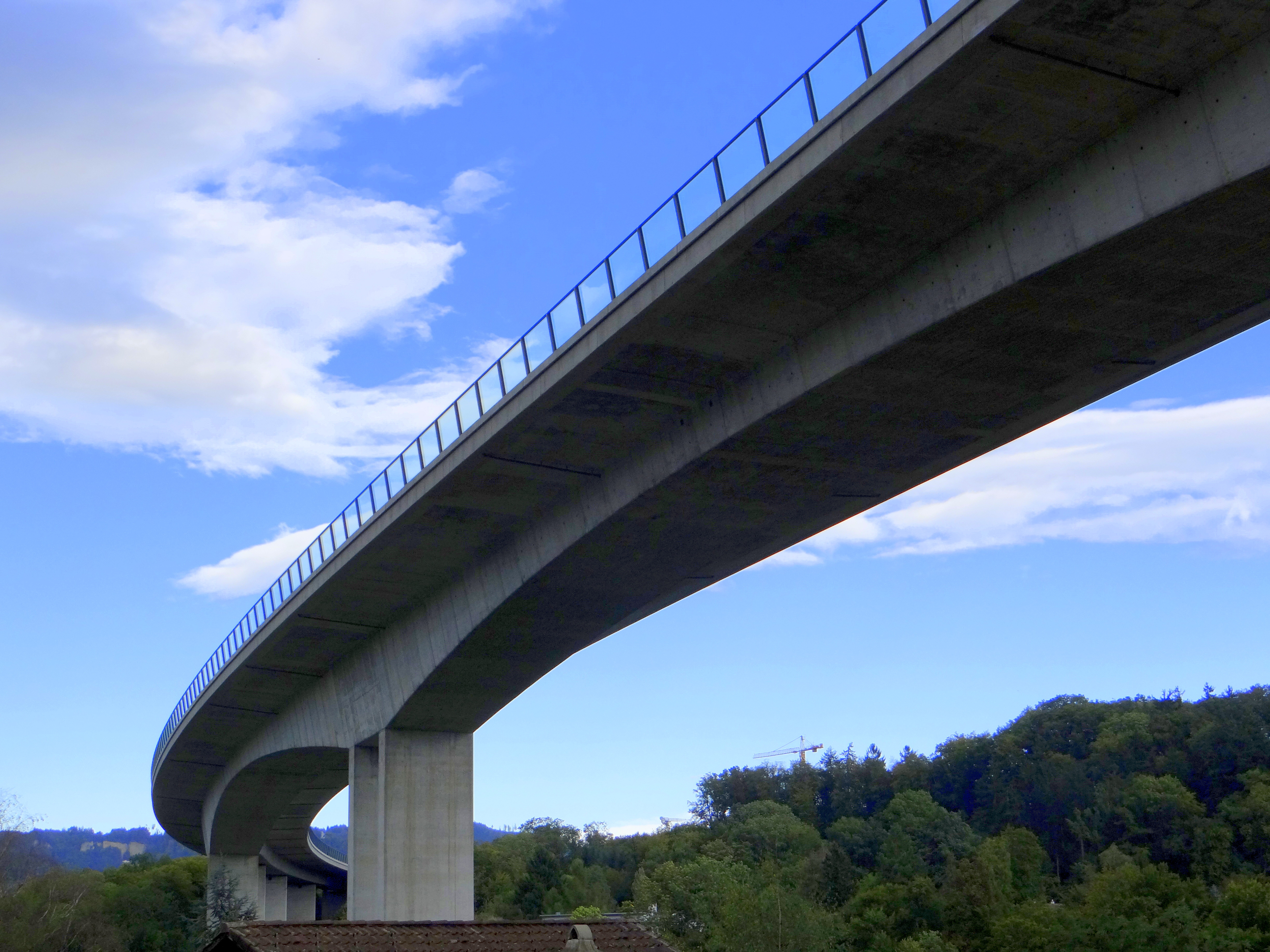
Felsenau Viaduct (1974) in Bern, Switzerland

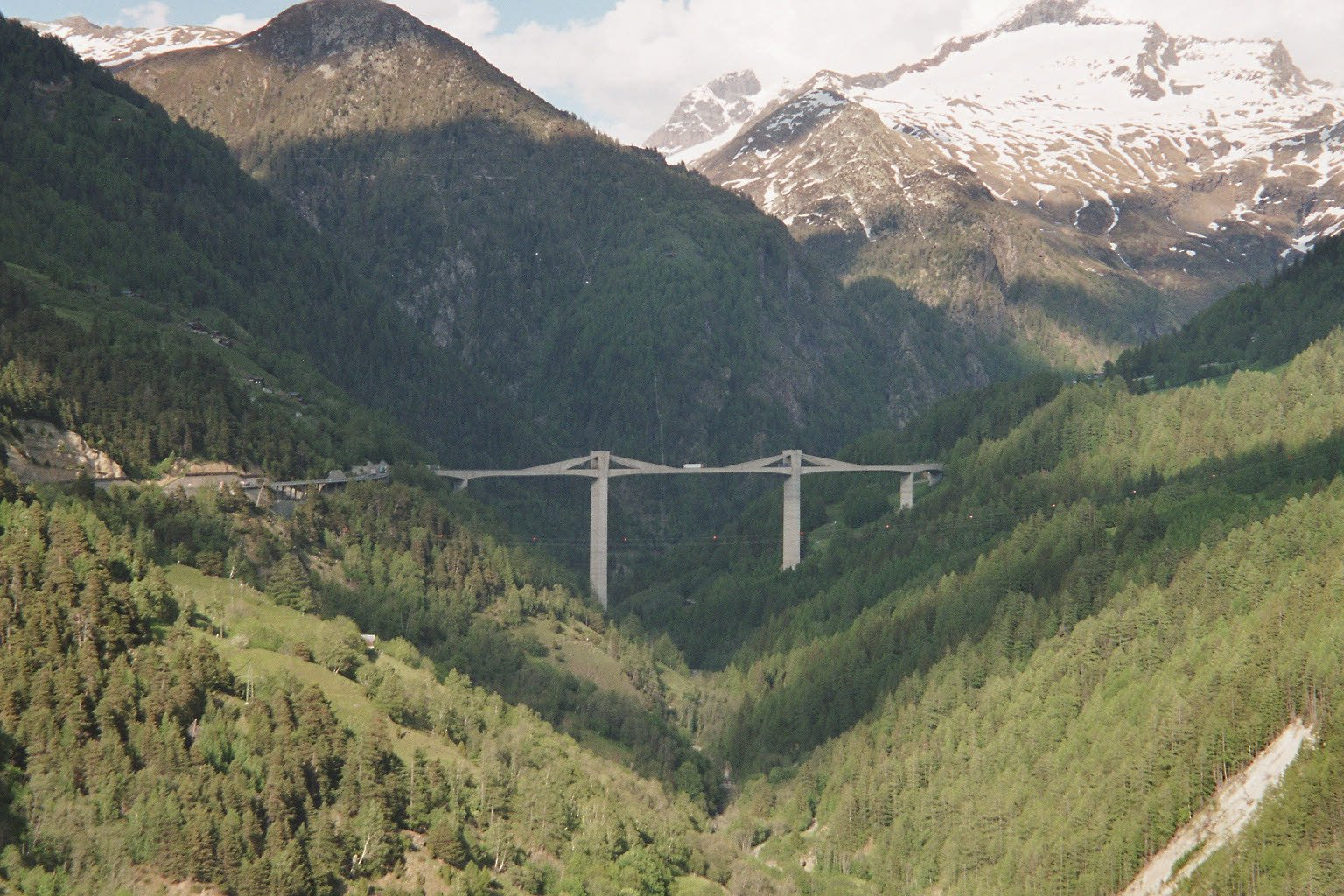
Ganter Bridge (1980) in Valais, Switzerland

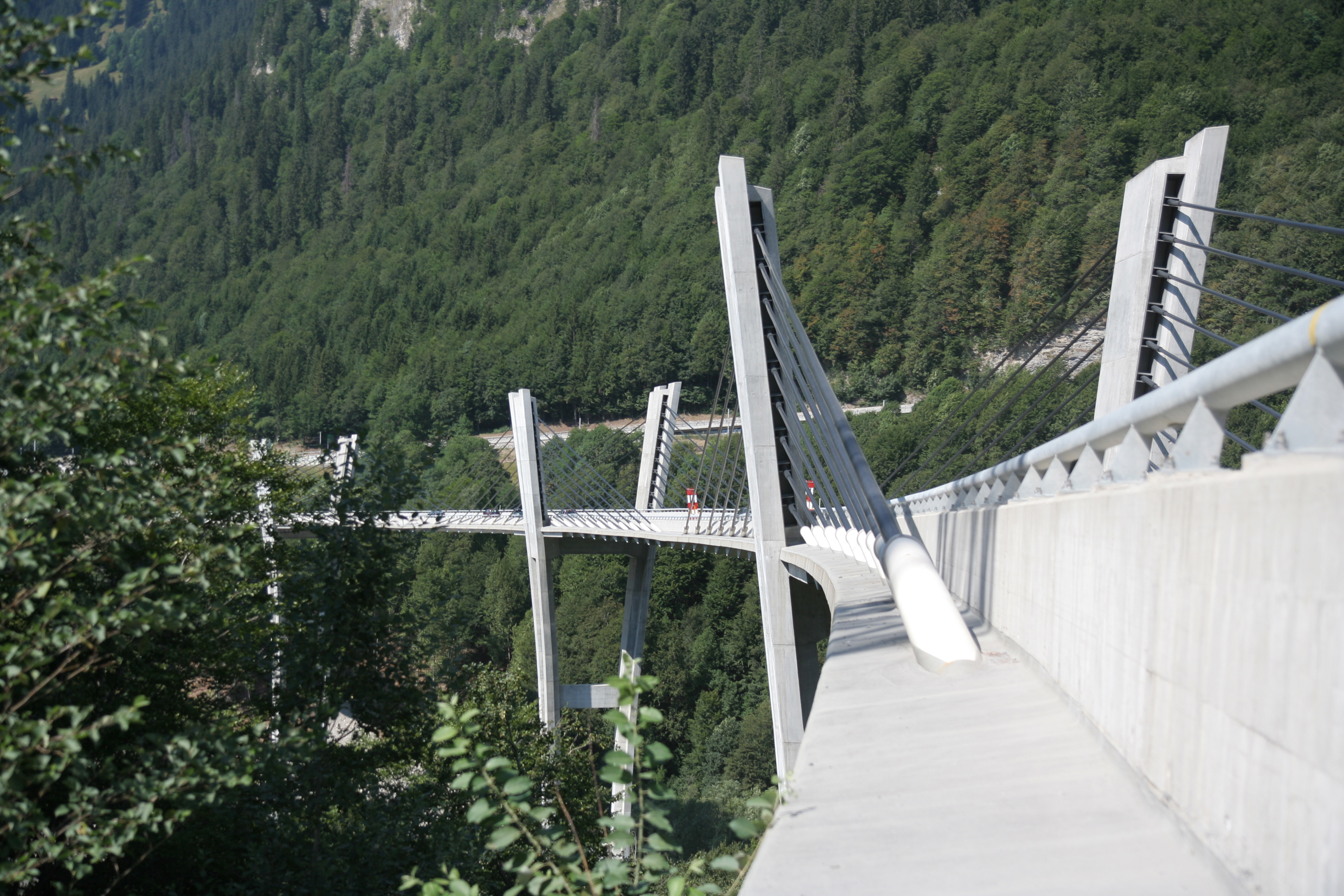
Sunniberg Bridge (1998), view from south abutment, near Klosters, Grisons, Switzerland

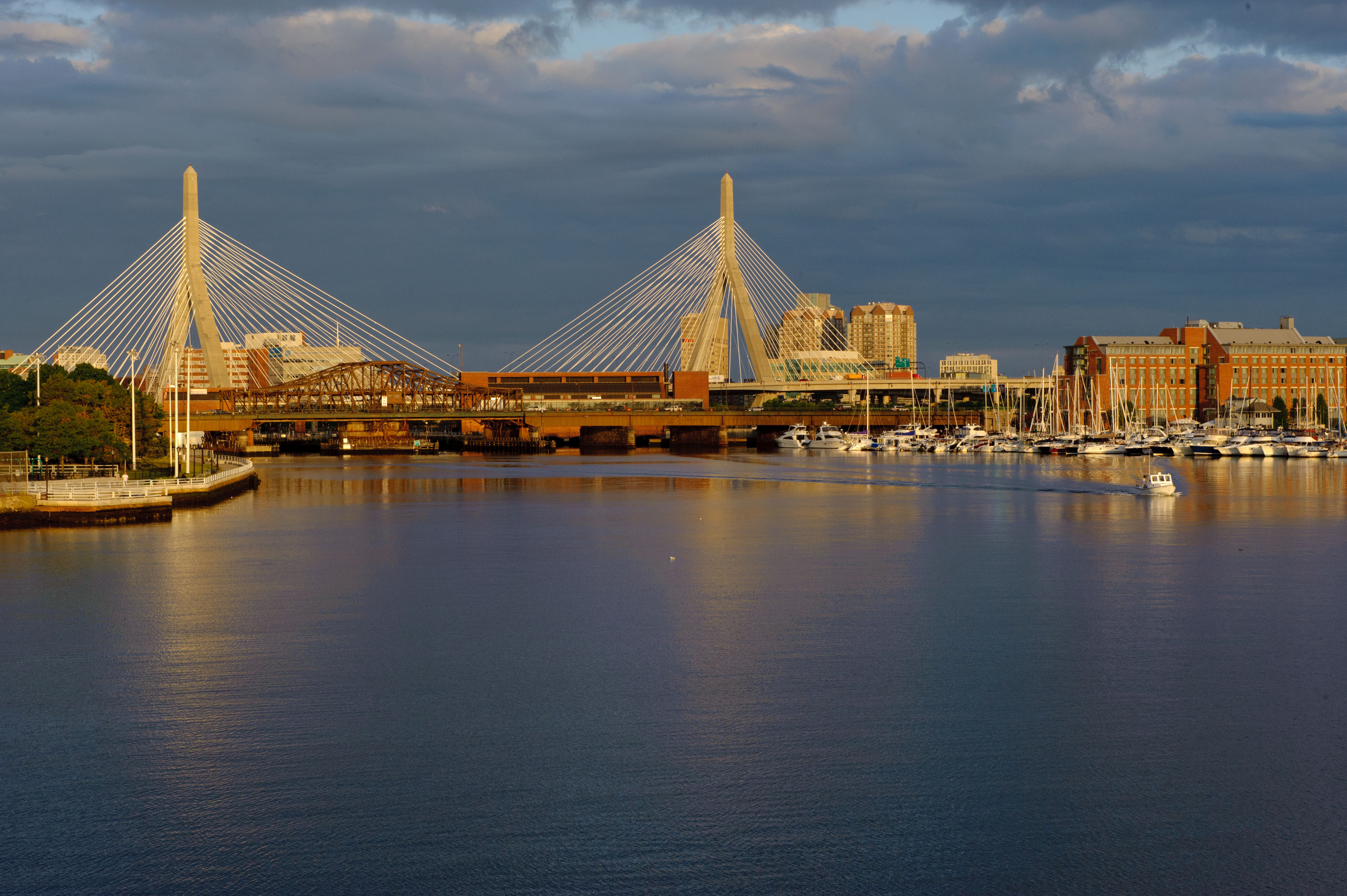
Leonard P. Zakim Bunker Hill Memorial Bridge (2003), Boston, USA

== Education and practical training ==
Born in Meiringen, Canton of Bern, Menn graduated from high school (Kantonsschule Chur) in 1946, followed by structural engineering studies at ETH Zurich. He received a diploma as Bauingenieur (civil engineer) in 1950. From 1950 through 1953 he worked for construction engineering companies. Then, he returned to ETH Zurich to become assistant to Pierre Lardy, a well-known professor of structural engineering, and was awarded a PhD degree in 1956. He gained practical experience working for companies in Paris and Bern before starting his own consulting company in 1957.

== Bridge design philosophy ==
Menn worked very closely with Pierre Lardy during the beginning of his career, emphasizing the design of structures based on aesthetics and economy. Menn believed that economy, serviceability and safety of the bridge would revolve around aesthetics. His earliest bridges were relatively long-span deck-stiffened arches in the tradition of Robert Maillart. For example, his Crestawald Bridge (1959) was a reinforced concrete bridge with a two-hinged arch.

But with the revolutionary new material — prestressed concrete — Menn saw that prestressing could actually replace the arch itself. The prestressed deck of his arch bridge could become the main supporting member without the arch. His Felsenau Viaduct (1974) at Bern did exactly that — the roadway was carried solely by a curved hollow-box beam that has been prestressed. The effect is a structure of exceptional lightness that satisfies all three of Menn's main criteria for design: efficiency, economy, and aesthetics. It is the longest viaduct of the A1 highway and the world's first single-cell box girder bridge built with the cantilever method, a pioneer work in prestressed concrete design and construction.

The Felsenau [Viaduct] is perhaps the most important bridge that I have designed. It is in the capital of my native country and the bridge is part of a major freeway that connects Bern to Geneva.

— Christian Menn

Later, with prestressing, Menn was able to design bridges that combined appropriately a prestressed cantilever girder bridge deck with a cable-stayed bridge form, introducing new forms as exemplified by his Ganter bridge (1980). In the words of David P. Billington: "Ganter bridge ... represents one of those rare events where a new form arises".

Menn's bridges had to be designed for the times: "Structural Analysis found itself at the time in the transition from descriptive graphical analysis to abstract analytical statics." (Menn, 2002)

Menn has stated that an engineer achieves safety and serviceability by understanding the underlying scientific principles, but that economy and elegance are achieved through non-scientific ideas. An engineer must also have aesthetic creativity. Menn describes his bridges with abstract theoretical models which allow him to analyze bridges and find stresses and distribution of forces within the structure. Building on this framework, he is able to devise numerical calculations which can eventually be used in computer modeling of the structures.

== Swiss tourism ==
The important role of tourism in the Swiss economy had a strong influence on the types of bridges that were constructed. When choosing a bridge design, Swiss leaders prioritized the aesthetic characteristics of a bridge more highly than a country that is less tourism-driven. The need for visually appealing bridges afforded bridge designer Menn with a great opportunity. His use of pre-stressed concrete and the implementation of cable-stayed bridge decks gave his designs great aesthetic appeal.

For example, when the winner was announced for Ganter bridge, the seven design entries were put on display at a museum in Bern. The jury had considered many details including overall concept, performance, aesthetics, cost, and the method of construction. The report released by the jury praised Menn's design as “...well balanced and convincing. The scale of the design fits well into the landscape."

== Professional organizations ==
Christian Menn was a member of the Swiss Society of Engineers and Architects (SIA), the Swiss Trade Group for Bridge and Building Engineering, International Association for Bridge and Structural Engineering (IABSE), and Swiss Code-Committee for Reinforced and Prestressed Concrete Structures. Before retirement, he was a member of the ETH research committee.

== Awards ==
- 2001: IABSE Outstanding Structure Award
- 2001: Auszeichnungen für gute Bauten Graubünden
- 2009: IABSE International Award of Merit in Structural Engineering

Menn’s numerous bridge structures, such as the Ganter Bridge and the Sunniberg Bridge in Switzerland, or the Leonard P. Zakim Bunker Hill Bridge in Boston, USA, as well as many others, are renowned worldwide for their structural beauty, economic efficiency, technical innovation, and for simply being structural engineering oeuvres of art.

== Influence ==
In spring 1979, Menn supervised a thesis on a bridge over the Acleta gorge close to Disentis in the Grisons by a young Santiago Calatrava, as he completed his studies in Civil Engineering at ETH Zurich. That same year, Menn also asked Calatrava to provide sketches for a bridge on tall pylons to cross a deep valley, and these sketches by Calatrava in 1979 containing finback and extradosed solutions were finally published in 2004.

Menn worked with a young Miguel Rosales on the Leonard P. Zakim Bunker Hill Memorial Bridge, completed in 2003, as part of the massive "Big Dig" project in Boston. This highly visible structure has become an iconic landmark in the Boston skyline, and helped launch Rosales' career as a bridge designer, carrying the older designer's philosophy into the next generation of structural designers.
