= Landquart (river) =

River in Switzerland

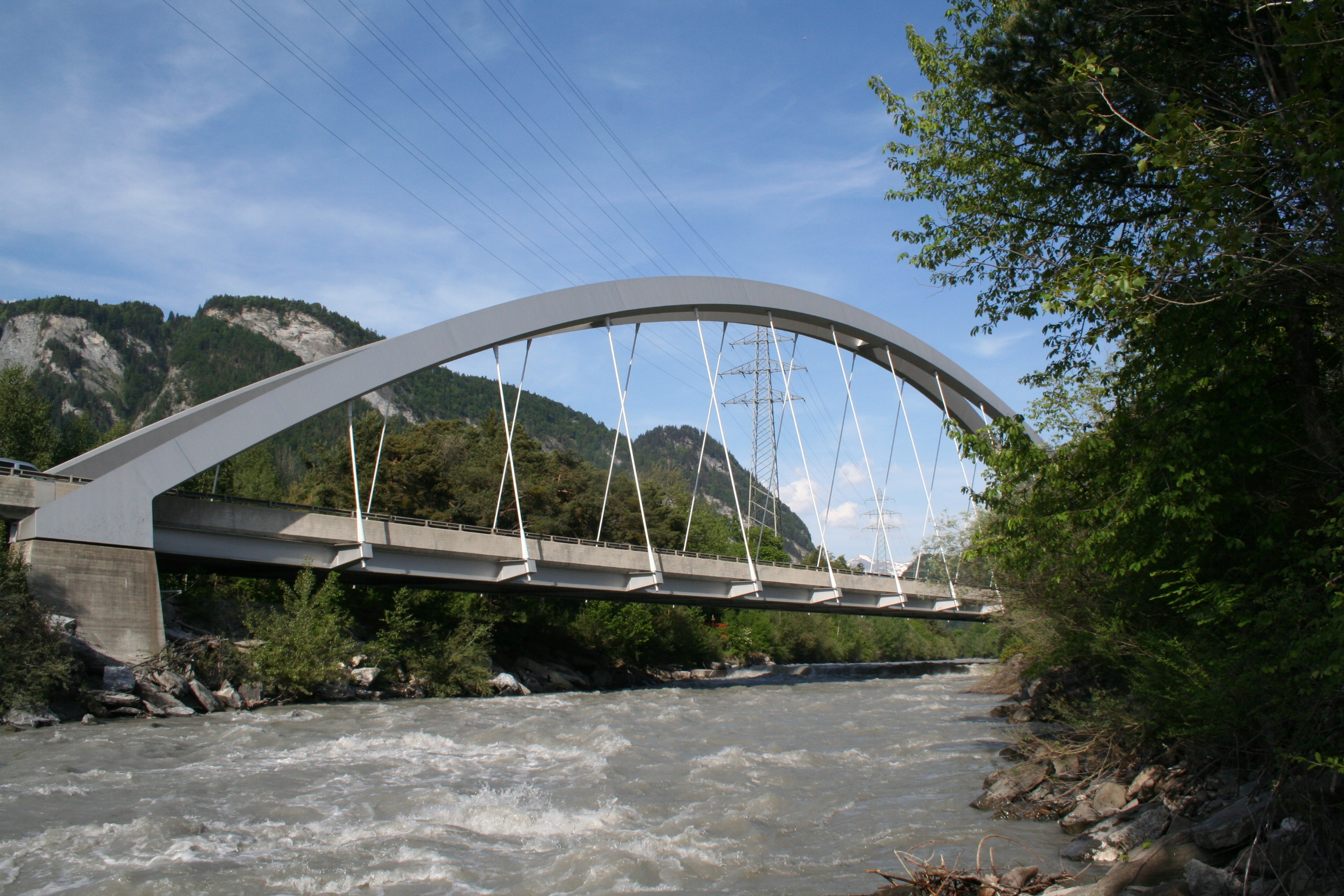
- bridge over the Landquart River near Malans, Grisons, Switzerland

Location
- Country: Switzerland

Physical characteristics
- Mouth: Alpine Rhine
  - coordinates: 46.9688°N 9.5503°E
- Length: 38 km (24 mi)
- Basin size: 615.17 km^{2} (237.52 sq mi)

Basin features
- Progression: Rhine→ North Sea

The Landquart is a river of Switzerland in the canton of Grisons and a right tributary of the Alpine Rhine, formed by the confluence of two mountain streams, Vereinabach and Verstanclabach, that originate from glaciers in the Silvretta Alps. It flows northwesterly through the village of Klosters, the largest and uppermost village in the Prättigau valley, and empties into the Alpine Rhine near the town of Landquart. It is 38 km (24 mi) long, with a 615.17 km^{2} (237.52 sq mi) drainage basin.

== See also ==
- Landquart-Davos Platz railway
- Sunniberg Bridge
- List of rivers of Switzerland
