= Zschokke (company) =

Swiss civil engineering company

- Formerly: Conrad Zschokke SA
- Company type: Joint-stock company
- Industry: Civil engineering
- Founded: 1909 in Aarau, Switzerland
- Founder: Conrad Zschokke
- Fate: Merged with Batigroup to form Implenia (2006)
- Headquarters: Geneva (from 1922)
- Products: Civil engineering works, dams, tunnels, bridges, hydroelectric and port construction

Zschokke was a Swiss civil engineering company. Founded in 1909, it became one of the largest Swiss civil engineering firms before merging with Batigroup in 2006 to form Implenia.

== History ==
Zschokke was created as a joint-stock company for major engineering works in 1909 by Conrad Zschokke at Aarau, with the support of private banks in Geneva and of Gustave Naville. Zschokke brought to his new company all his current contracts and worksites, as well as his metal construction workshops at Döttingen. After the founder's death, the offices (1918) and then the registered office of Conrad Zschokke SA (1922) were transferred to Geneva, under Naville's chairmanship.

Having become one of the largest Swiss civil engineering firms, the company set up subsidiaries in France and Italy (1919–1924). It carried out major works in Switzerland and abroad, including port works (the extension of the port of Marseille) and hydroelectric installations (notably the Augst-Wyhlen and Laufenburg power stations), dams, motorways, runways, bridges, tunnels, and underground constructions (notably the Dinorwic power station in Great Britain), as well as car parks.

Transformed into a holding company in 1963, Zschokke merged with Batigroup of Basel in 2006 to form Implenia, headquartered in Zürich.

== Bibliography ==
- C. Courtiau et al., Zschokke, 2006 (with bibliography)
