= Döttingen =

Döttingen may refer to the following places:

== In Germany ==
- Döttingen, a subdivision of Braunsbach, Baden-Württemberg
- Döttingen, a subdivision of Herresbach, Rhineland-Palatinate

== In Switzerland ==
- Döttingen, Aargau, in the Canton of Aargau
