= Poya Bridge =

Poya Bridge Pont de la Poya
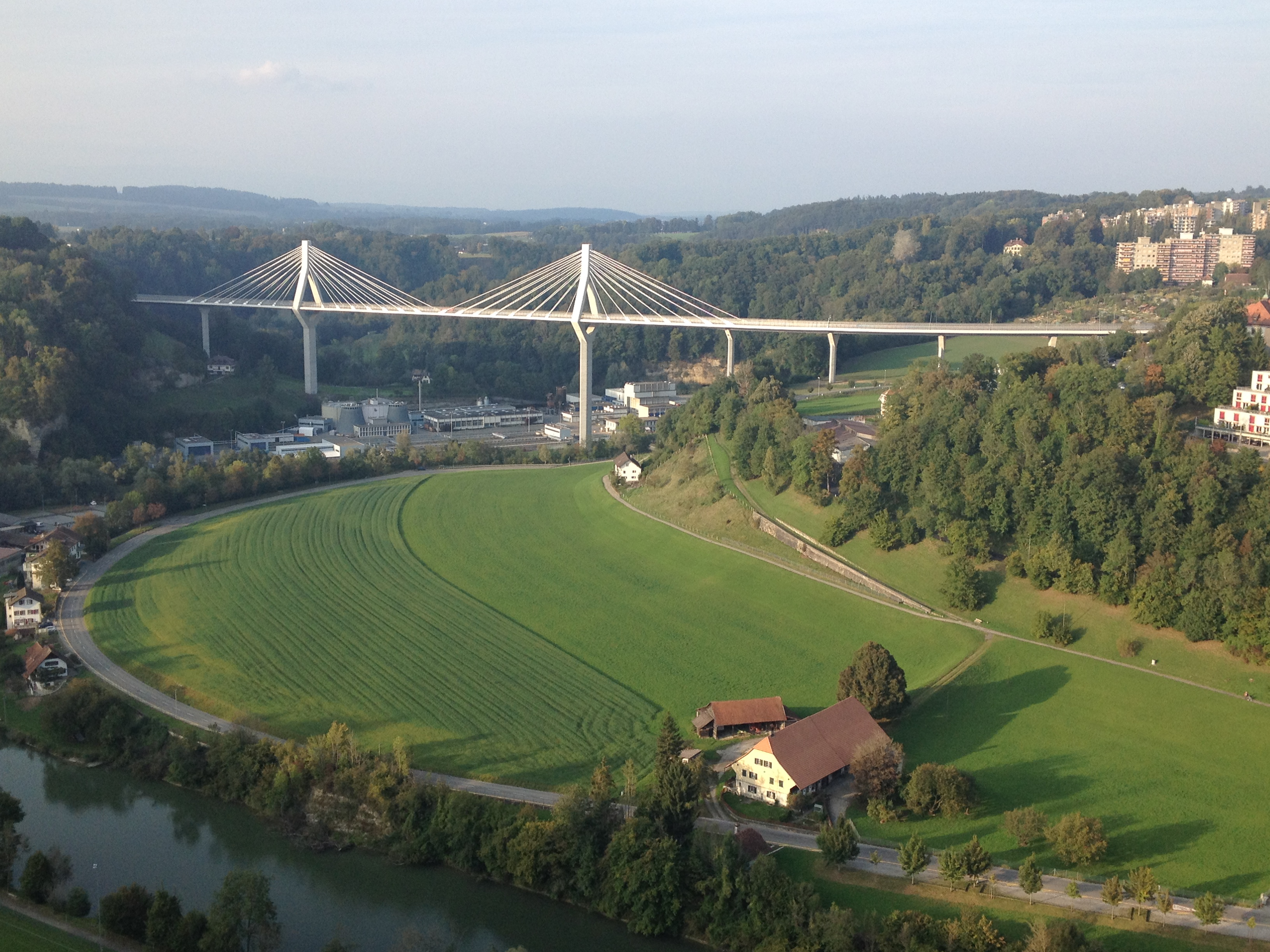
- Coordinates: 46.813006°N 7.165155°E
- Carries: Vehicular traffic (3 lanes) plus pedestrian/cyclist path
- Crosses: Sarine River
- Owner: Canton of Fribourg

Characteristics
- Design: Multi-span, cable-stayed bridge
- Total length: 851.6 metres (2,794 ft)
- Width: 19.25 metres (63.2 ft)
- Height: 107.65 metres (353.2 ft)
- Longest span: 196.00 metres (643.04 ft)
- Clearance below: 70 metres (230 ft) (approx.)

History
- Construction start: 31 October 2008
- Construction cost: CHF 211 million (Note: The exchange rate of the Swiss franc fluctuated significantly during the construction period (2008-2014). Against the U.S. dollar, it fluctuated from about $0.82 to $1.36. At 1 franc=$1.05, the construction cost was $221.5 million. Against the Euro, it fluctuated from about €0.63 to €1.00. At 1 franc=€0.82, the construction cost was €173 million.)
- Opened: 12 October 2014
- Inaugurated: 10 October 2014

Statistics
- Daily traffic: 25,000 vehicles

Poya Bridge (French: Pont de la Poya, pronounced [pɔ̃ də la pɔja]) is a cable-stayed bridge in Fribourg, Switzerland. The bridge is 851.6 metres (2,794 ft) in overall length with a 196 m (643 ft) main span over the Sarine River, which is the longest main span in Switzerland. The bridge was built to remove traffic from the Zaehringen Bridge and adjacent neighborhoods and upon opening, on 12 October 2014, the Zaehringen Bridge was closed to most motor vehicles.

== Planning and construction ==
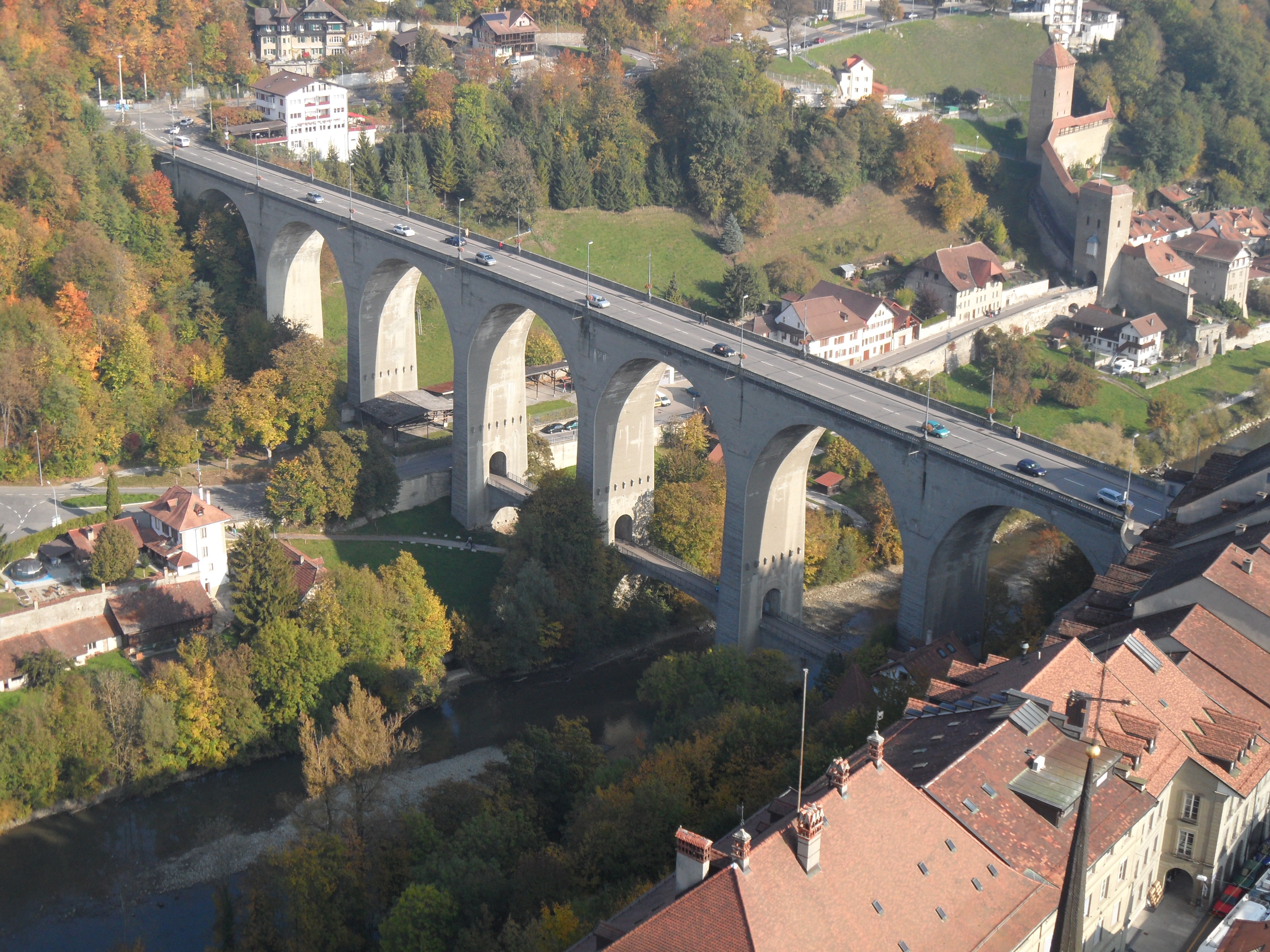
The Zaehringen Bridge, which the Poya Bridge functionally replaces

Numerous studies have been made since 1959 for a new crossing of the Sarine River in Fribourg. In 1989, the local government invited five engineering firms to submit concept proposals for a new crossing. Plans for the new bridge were crafted in the 1990s and 2000s. Motivation for constructing the bridge was to remove a significant amount of vehicular traffic from the Zaehringen Bridge and surrounding Bourg quarter, Fribourg's historic center. The 25,000 vehicles per day took a significant toll on quality of life in the neighborhood and were degrading the Fribourg Cathedral, a symbol of the city.

In June 2006, the Grand Council of Fribourg approved the project and scheduled a public vote to approve financing of the project. Three months later, financing of the Poya Bridge was approved by 81% of Fribourg voters. The contractor was a consortium of Implenia Construction SA, Grisoni-Zaugg SA et Routes Modernes SA.

Work began on 31 October 2008 and the bridge opened to vehicular traffic on 12 October 2014. The bridge cost 211 million Swiss francs. Upon opening, the Zaehringen Bridge was closed to most motor vehicles and now serves only emergency vehicles, public transportation buses, motorized scooters, cyclists, and pedestrians.

== Characteristics ==
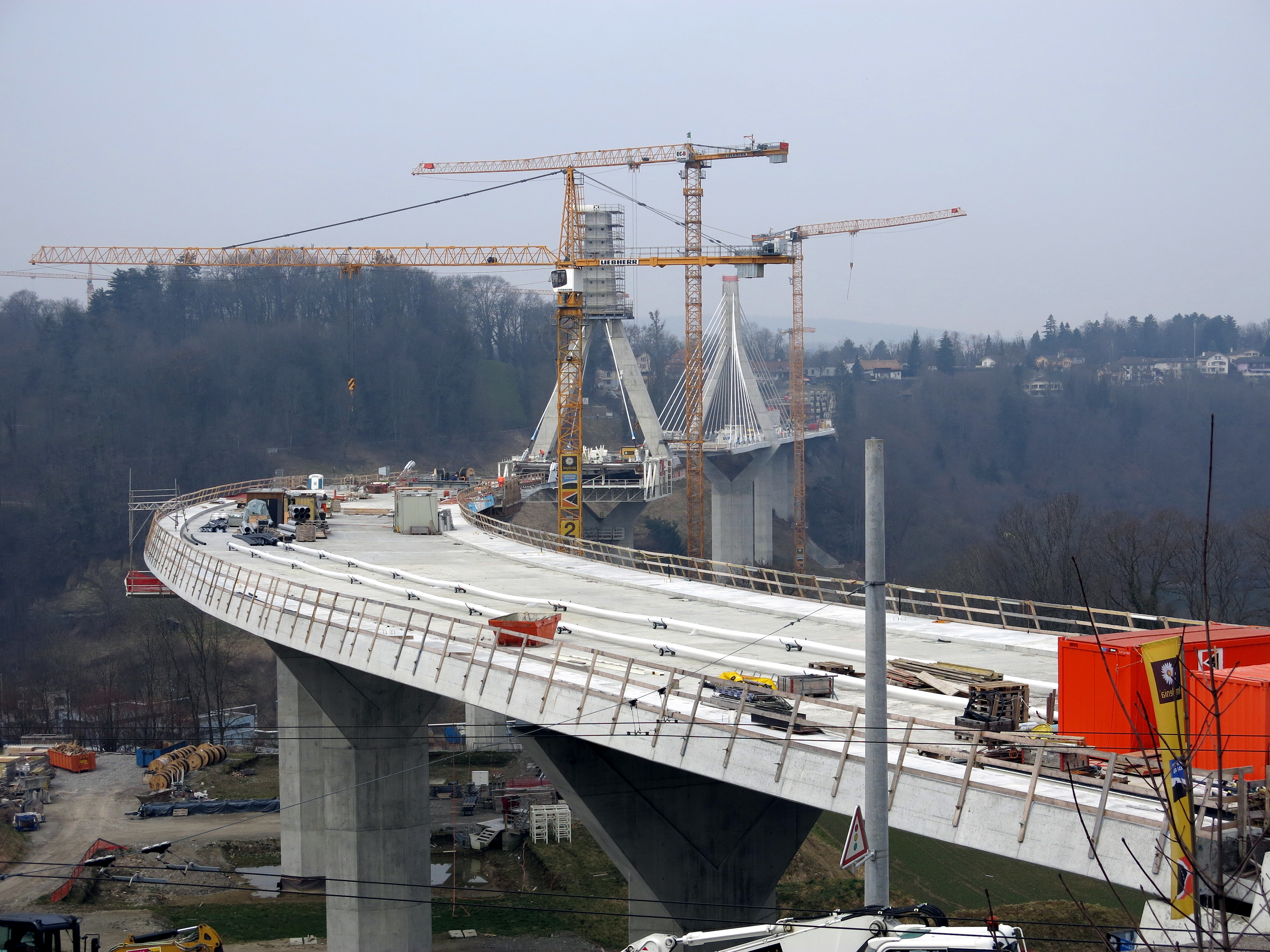
Poya Bridge during construction

The main span of the bridge is 196.00 m (643.04 ft) in length—the longest in Switzerland—and positioned between two pylons of unequal height. The southeast pylon, on the bank of the Sarine River, rises 107.65 m (353.2 ft) above the river. The northwest pylon rises 90.96 m (298.4 ft) above its base, which is higher than the southeast pylon. The two pylons support a 368 m (1,207 ft) cable-stayed span. The remainder of the bridge is supported by ten piers. A cover on the northwest 160 m (520 ft) of the bridge leading to the tunnel entrance was added to reduce noise in the adjacent Palatinat quarter.

The bridge deck carries three lanes of traffic—two leading towards the town center and one away from the town center—and a shared path for pedestrians and cyclists. The bridge deck is inclined; the southeast end is approximately 18 m (59 ft) higher than the northwest end. The bridge deck is flanked by 2.5 m (8 ft 2 in) barriers to prevent suicide attempts.

The northwest end of the bridge leads directly into a cut-and-cover tunnel, known as the 272 m (892 ft) Poya Tunnel (French: Tunnel de Poya) and built at the same time as the bridge at a cost of 28 million francs. The tunnel travels beneath the Berne-Fribourg rail line and Palatinat Park. The pedestrian and cycling path diverges from the bridge and leads to the Bellevue and Palatinat quarters without entering the tunnel. The tunnel from the bridge intersects a short subterranean segment of Rue de Morat. The intersection is an underground roundabout around a cone-shaped column.

The speed limit is 60 km/h on the bridge and 50 km/h in the tunnel.
