= Implenia =

Swiss construction services company

Implenia AG
- Type: Public (Aktiengesellschaft)
- Traded as: SIX: IMPN
- ISIN: CH0023868554
- Industry: Construction: Buildings, Civil Engineering, Service Solutions
- Founded: 2006
- Headquarters: Opfikon, Switzerland
- Key people: Hans-Ulrich Meister (Chairman); Jens Vollmar (CEO)
- Revenue: ▼CHF 3,475 million (2025)
- Operating income: ▲CHF 140.5 million (2025)
- Net income: ▼CHF 84.7 million (2025)
- Number of employees: 8,346 (2025)
- Website: implenia.com

Implenia is a Swiss real estate and construction services company with activities in development and civil engineering in Switzerland and Germany. Implenia is also active in tunneling and related infrastructure construction in Austria, France, Sweden, Norway and Italy. The Group was formed at the beginning of 2006 from the merger of Basel-based Batigroup Holding AG with Geneva-based Zschokke Holding SA. The headquarters are located in Glattpark (Opfikon) in the canton of Zurich. Implenia is one of the 500 largest companies in Switzerland.

== History ==
=== Origin ===
Implenia was created out of a series of mergers between Swiss regional construction companies, but ultimately from the 2006 merger of Batigroup and Zschokke Holding.

In mid-1997 Preiswerk Holding AG merged with Schweizerische Strassenbau- und Tiefbau-Unternehmung AG (Stuag) / Stuag Holding AG and Schmalz AG Bauunternehmung / Schmalz Holding AG to form Batigroup Holding based in Basel. Batigroup's core competencies centered on traditional construction activities, including road construction, poured asphalt, civil engineering, tunnel construction and building construction.

The basis of Zschokke Holding was the construction company Castor, Hersent et Zschokke, founded in 1872 in Aarau by Conrad Zschokke (1842-1918), which was transferred to the public limited company Conrad Zschokke in 1909. Through acquisitions and mergers, in 1982 the joint-stock company Heinr. Hatt-Haller and in 1997 Locher & Cie AG, among others, became part of Zschokke Holding, whose headquarters were most recently in Geneva. In addition to building construction, Zschokke acquired in particular general planning, general contracting and real estate management.

Due to the largely complementary business areas, Zschokke and Batigroup began talks about a possible merger in summer 2005. Following these discussions, the intention to merge to form Implenia was announced publicly on 15 November 2005. Finally, the shareholders of Zschokke and Batigroup approved the merger at simultaneous AGMs held on 2 March 2006. ZB Didumos AG, founded as a placeholder company for the future company, was renamed Implenia AG in the course of the merger in 2005. The headquarters of the new company became Zurich.

=== Implenia AG ===
The shares of Zschokke and Batigroup were delisted from the SIX Swiss Exchange after close of trading on 3 March 2006. The merger was completed by exchanging shares for the new Implenia shares, the value ratio being set at 65 (Zschokke) to 35 (Batigroup). The first trading day of Implenia shares on the Swiss stock exchange was 6 March 2006.

In 2010, Implenia had acquired the Norwegian Betonmast Anlegg, a Norwegian infrastructure specialist. Since March 2015, the German Bilfinger Construction (now renamed Implenia Construction) with activities in Germany, Austria and Sweden has also been part of the Group. The acquisition of Bilfinger Hochbau followed in 2016.

On 27 October 2020, Implenia announced an accelerated restructuring starting in 2021, marking a break with the construction group's years-long push for internationalization, which it declared over. Its stock market value halved over the past two years, largely due to previous project acquisitions and purchases (such as in Sweden between 2015 and 2017). The company withdrew from unprofitable business areas in some markets (Sweden, Norway and Romania) and has since focused largely on Switzerland and Germany. Here, Implenia is active as a real estate developer and manager, as well as in building construction, civil engineering and specialist businesses such as timber construction and facade technology. In the rest of Europe, the focus is largely on tunnel construction, as in Austria, France, Sweden, Norway and Italy. As part of this accelerated restructuring, Implenia announced plans to lay off around 750 people and cut 2000 full-time positions by 2023. This transformation was completed ahead of schedule.

In May 2021, Implenia completed the acquisition of BAM Swiss AG, a healthcare construction services provider in Switzerland headquartered in Basel. With this acquisition, Implenia took over BAM Swiss AG's current projects such as the planning and realization of the Aarau Cantonal Hospital, the BSSE in Basel – a modern laboratory and research building for biosystems science and engineering – as well as the Felix Platter Hospital project in Basel and an ETH student residence in Zurich.

Implenia acquired the leading Swiss real estate service provider Wincasa in May 2023. In 2026, Implenia acquired Zigmo Engineering, an engineering firm for structural and project design based in Frankenthal, Rhineland-Palatinate.

== Corporate structure ==
Implenia's Chief Executive Officer (CEO) is Jens Vollmar. Also on the Executive Board are Stefan Baumgärtner (CFO), Adrian Wyss (Head Division Buildings), Erwin Scherer (Head Division Civil Engineering), German Grüniger (General Counsel) and Petra Feigl-Fässler (Chief Human Resources Officer). Hans-Ulrich Meister is Chairman of the Board of Directors. The company generated sales of CHF 3.475 billion in 2025 and employed 8,346 people in 2025. It is headquartered in Opfikon, Switzerland.

Implenia's business areas are divided into three divisions: Buildings, Civil Engineering and Service Solutions. These divisions consist of the following units and sub-brands: BBV Systems GmbH, Building Construction Logistics GmbH, Implenia Holzbau, Implenia Fassadentechnik GmbH, Planovita, and Encira.

Implenia is also active in the management of properties in Switzerland through its real estate service provider Wincasa.

== Major projects ==
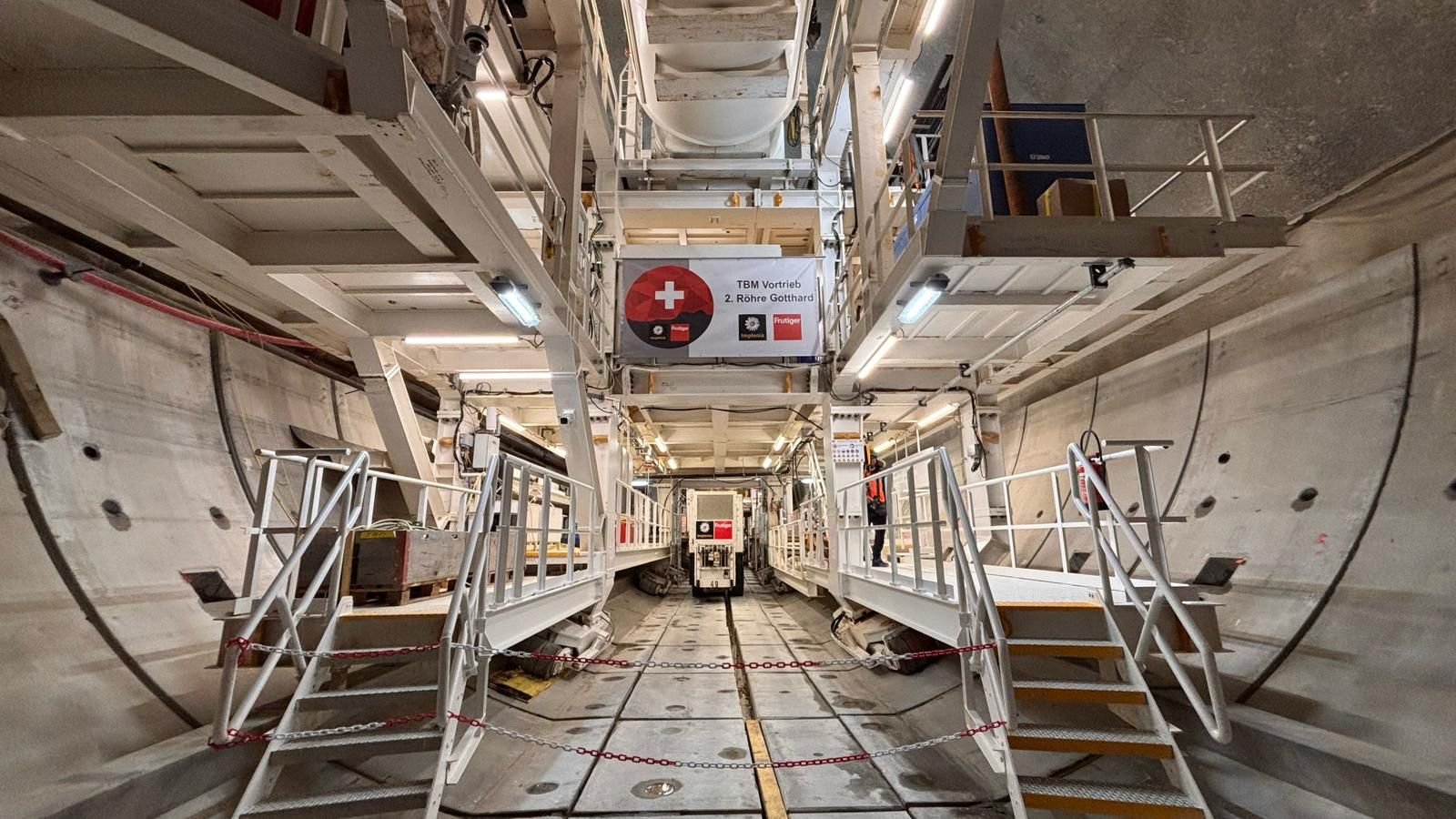
Gotthard tunnel

Major projects involving the company include:

- Roxburgh Dam completed in 1953
- Dinorwig Power Station completed in 1984
- Sunniberg Bridge completed in 1998
- Stade de Genève completed in 2003
- Pont de la Poya completed in 2014
- Swissmill Tower completed in 2016
- Gotthard Base Tunnel (Sedrun Section) completed in 2016
- Nant de Drance Hydropower Plant, Finhaut, completed in 2018
- Koralm Tunnel, Austria, due to complete in 2026
- Gotthard Road Tunnel, main lot north, second tube, Switzerland, due to complete in 2027
- Swiss National Science Foundation Office in Bern, due to complete in 2027
- Line C of Toulouse Metro in France, due to complete in 2028
- Medical Research and Training Centre for the University of Bern, due to complete in 2028
- Semmering Base Tunnel, lots 1.1 and 2.1 Gloggnitz and Fröschnitzgraben tunnel sections, Austria, due to complete in 2030
- Grand Paris Express, Lot T2C of Line 15 South in France, due to complete in 2030
- Brenner Base Tunnel, Austria, due to complete in 2032
- Mont-Cenis Base Tunnel between Lyon in France and Turin in Italy, due to be completed by 2032
- E39 Rogfast Tunnel in Norway, due to complete in 2032
- Lågen Bridge, new construction on the E6 motorway north of Lillehammer, Norway, due to complete in 2033
- Expansion of Stammstrecke of the Munich S-Bahn in Germany, due to complete in 2035
- Railway section for East Link in Sweden, due to complete in 2035
- Clinic 2 for the University Hospital of Basel, due to complete in 2042

== Awards (selection) ==
- 2012: Real Estate Award in the category "Project Development" for the residential development "Schorenstadt"
- 2014: "Tunneling Contractor of the Year" for Nant de Drance pumped storage power plant, which was selected as "Major Project of the Year" by the International Tunneling & Underground Space Association (ITA-AITES)
- 2019: "Prize for the development of a Swiss company in France" awarded by the France-Switzerland Chamber of Commerce and Industry (CCIFS)
- 2020: IR Magazine Awards – Europe 2020 / Best annual report (small cap) / Winner
- 2021: "Highest Reputation" by Deutschlandtest
- 2022: Award in "Germany's Digital Pioneers" in the "Technology Reputation" category from the F.A.Z. Institute
- 2022: Award "Digital Champion" by Deutschlandtest
- 2022: Award for "Most Innovative Companies" by Deutschlandtest

== Controversies ==
Construction defects

Construction defects at the Letzigrund Stadium in Zurich, which was built by Implenia and still being completed under great time pressure for the 2008 European Soccer Championships, led to ten years of legal proceedings against the company. The starting point was cracks and defective weld seams on the steel girders, which Implenia denied as "scaremongering." However, the city of Zurich feared that the roof posed a danger to spectators and secured the roof with additional supports on the stands at its own expense. The proceedings were resolved in 2021 with a court settlement in which both parties agreed to mutually waive all outstanding claims.

Payment delays and subcontractor bankruptcy

In 2019, Implenia started holding "supplier summits", which were intended to boost company profit margins by asking business partners to voluntarily pay rebates to Implenia. In 2025, Temps Présent and Radio Télévision Suisse (RTS) investigated Implenia's payment delays and subcontractor bankruptcy. In response, in 2025, André Wyss, CEO of Implenia, said that Implenia's "procurement organization is well-structured, and we [Implenia] maintain long-term relationships with many suppliers, subcontractors, and partners."

SISAG

Implenia also owns SISAG, Côte d'Ivoire’s largest granite quarry. Sexual harassment and management dysfunctionality were reported in 2022.

== Sources ==
- Gray, Tony (1987). The Road to Success: Alfred McAlpine 1935–1985. Rainbird Publishing.
