= Brodbeck =

Brodbeck is a surname. Notable people with the surname include:

- Andrew R. Brodbeck (1860–1937), American politician
- Christine Brodbeck (born 1950), Swiss dancer and author
- Dan Brodbeck, Canadian record producer and audio engineer
- Joshua Brodbeck, American classical organist
- May Brodbeck (1917–1983), American philosopher of science
- Mauren Brodbeck (born 1974), Swiss artist
- Simon Brodbeck (born 1986), French artist
