= Findlay, Ohio =

- City
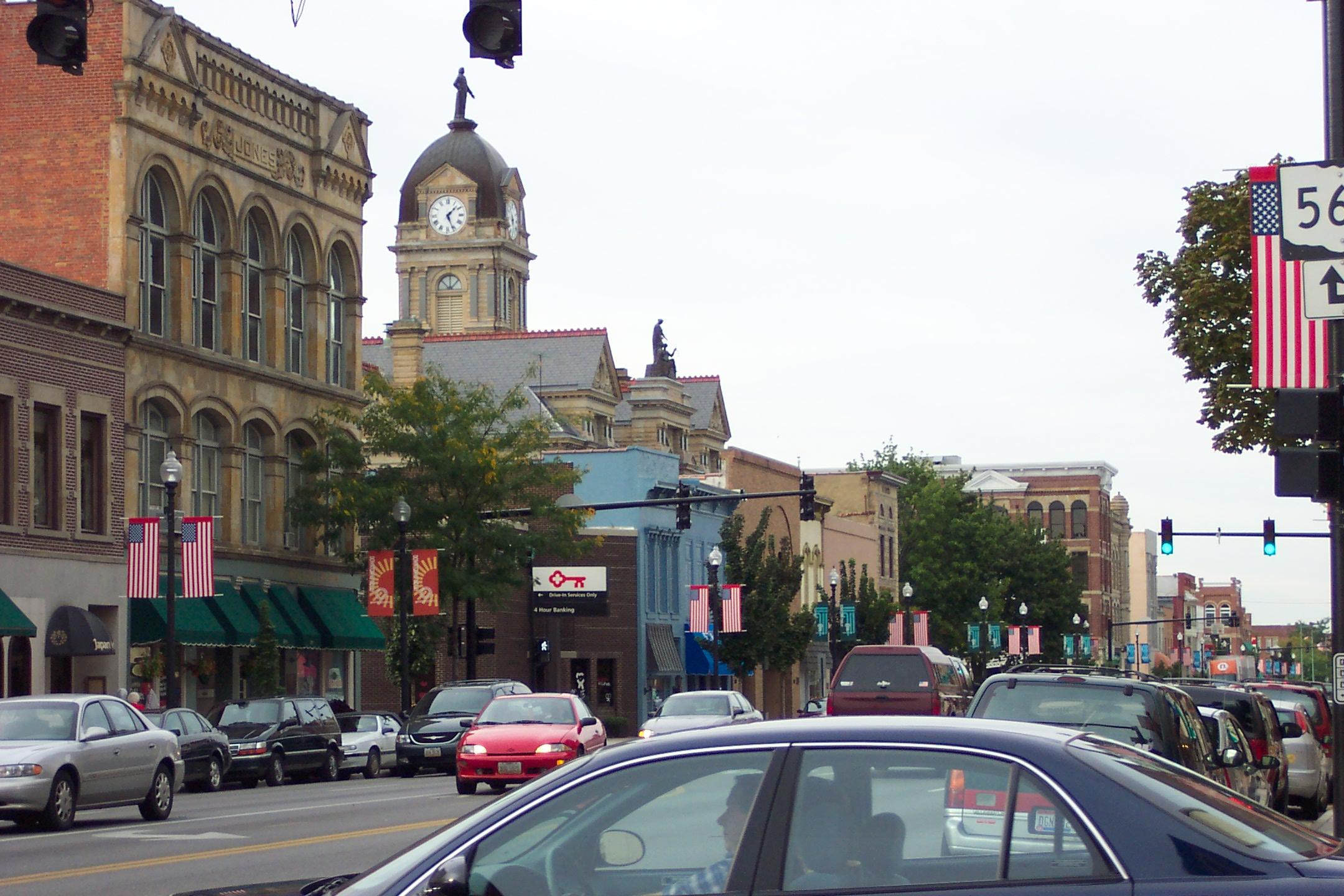
- Downtown Findlay
- Nickname: Flag City, USA
- Interactive map of Findlay, Ohio
- Location within Ohio Location within the United States
- Coordinates: 41°02′34″N 83°38′32″W
- Country: United States
- State: Ohio
- County: Hancock

Area
  - Total: 19.77 sq mi (51.21 km^{2})
  - Land: 19.64 sq mi (50.87 km^{2})
  - Water: 0.13 sq mi (0.34 km^{2})
- Elevation: 781 ft (238 m)

Population (2020)
  - Total: 40,313
  - Estimate (2023): 40,139
  - Density: 2,052.5/sq mi (792.49/km^{2})
- Time zone: UTC-5 (Eastern (EST))
  - Summer (DST): UTC-4 (EDT)
- ZIP codes: 45839-45840
- Area codes: 419, 567
- FIPS code: 39-27048
- GNIS feature ID: 1086245
- Website: www.findlayohio.gov

Findlay (/ˈfɪnli/ FIN-lee or /ˈfɪndli/ FIHND-lee) is a city in Hancock County, Ohio, United States, and its county seat. The second-largest city in Northwest Ohio, Findlay lies about 40 miles (64 km) south of Toledo. The population was 40,313 at the 2020 census. The principal city of the Findlay micropolitan area, it is home to the University of Findlay and the headquarters of Marathon Petroleum.

== History ==
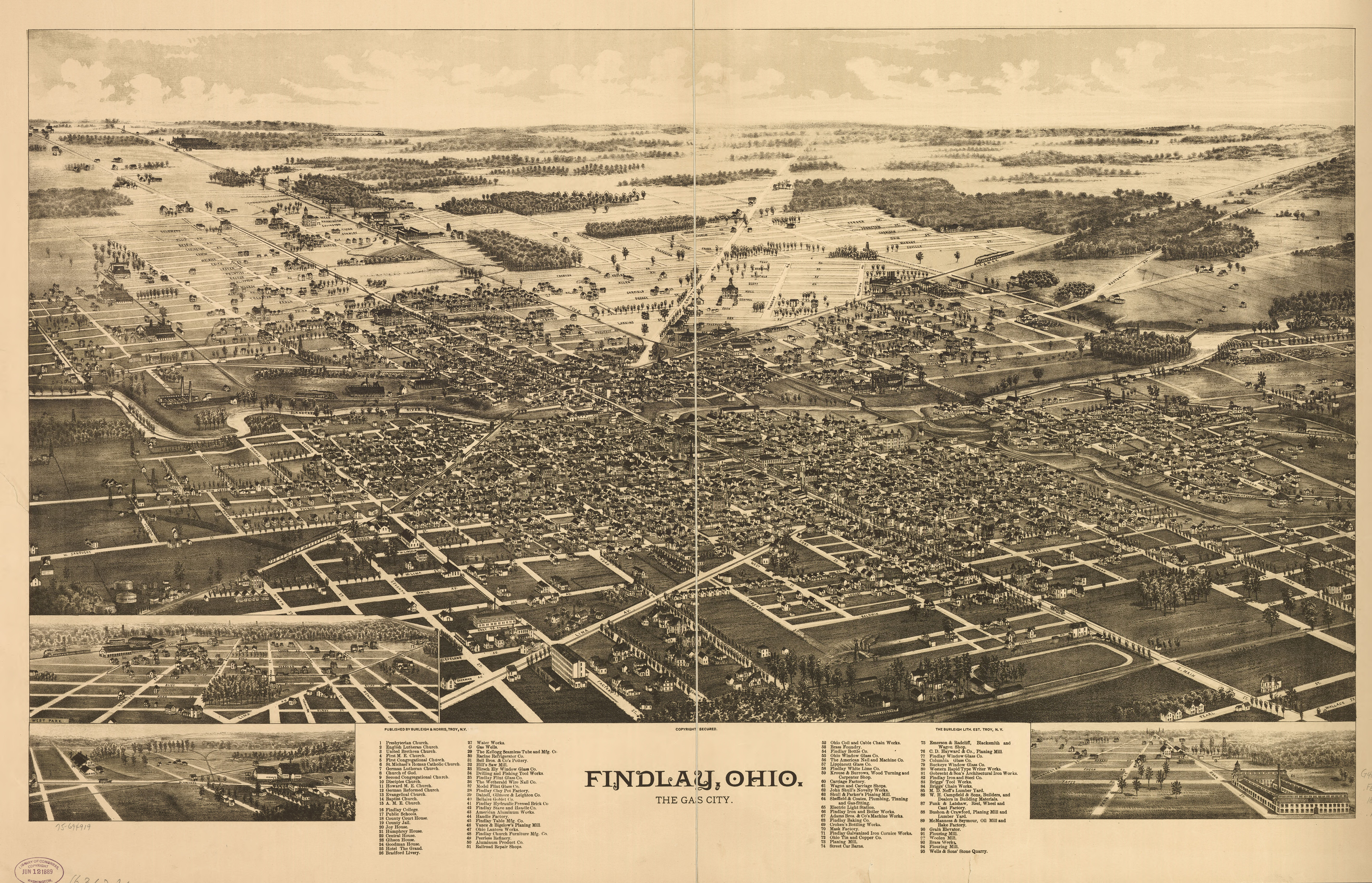
Panoramic map of Findlay, circa 1889

In the War of 1812, Colonel James Findlay of Cincinnati built a road and a stockade to transport and shelter troops in the Great Black Swamp region. This stockade was named Fort Findlay in his honor. At the conclusion of the war, the community of Findlay was born. The first town lots were laid out in 1821 by future Ohio Governor Joseph Vance and Elnathan Corry.

Before the Civil War, Findlay was a stop for slaves along the Underground Railroad.

In 1861, David Ross Locke moved to Findlay, where he served as editor for the Hancock Jeffersonian newspaper until he left in 1865. It was in the Hancock Jeffersonian that Locke penned the first of his Nasby letters.

During the 1880s, Findlay was a booming center of oil and natural gas production, though the supply of petroleum had dwindled by the early 20th century.

Findlay hosted the highly competitive Ohio State Music Festival in 1884. A young cornet player, Warren G. Harding, and his Citizens' Cornet Band of Marion placed third in the competition. Harding went on to be elected the 29th President of the United States.

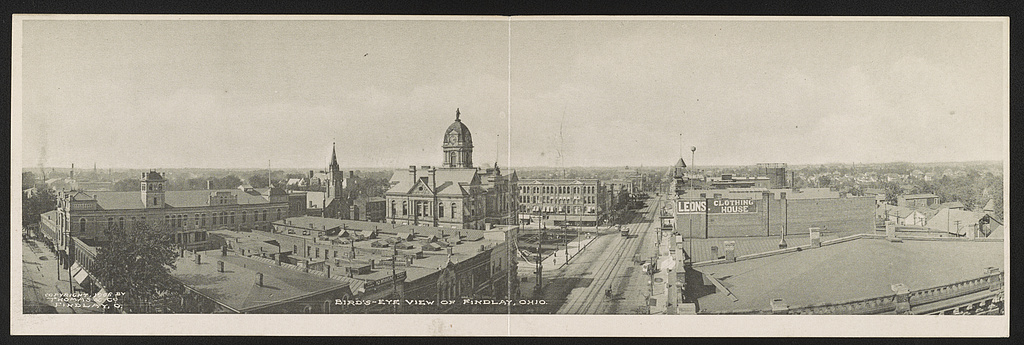
Bird's-eye view of Findlay, circa 1906

On March 31, 1892, the only known lynching in the history of Hancock County occurred when a mob of 1,000 men, many "respectable citizens", broke into the county jail in Findlay. They lynched Mr. Lytle, who had seriously (but not fatally as believed at the time) injured his wife and two daughters with a hatchet the day before, by hanging him twice (first from the bridge, then a telegraph pole) and finally shooting his body over a dozen times. The authorities had intended to secretly convey the prisoner to a suburb at one o'clock, where a train was to have been taken for Lima, but their plans were frustrated by the mob.

In 1908, American songwriter Tell Taylor wrote the standard, "Down by the Old Mill Stream" while fishing along the Blanchard River in Findlay. The song was published in 1910.

A disaster occurred during the 1936 Independence Day celebration, where a stray firework fell into a crowd, injuring 16 people and attracting national media attention.

For three months in the early 1960s, Findlay had the distinction of being the only community in the world where touch-tone telephone service was available. Touch-tone service was first introduced there on November 1, 1960.

In 2007, a flood that crested at 18.46 feet caused around $100 million in damage. The flood was nearly as strong as the 1913 flood.

== Geography ==
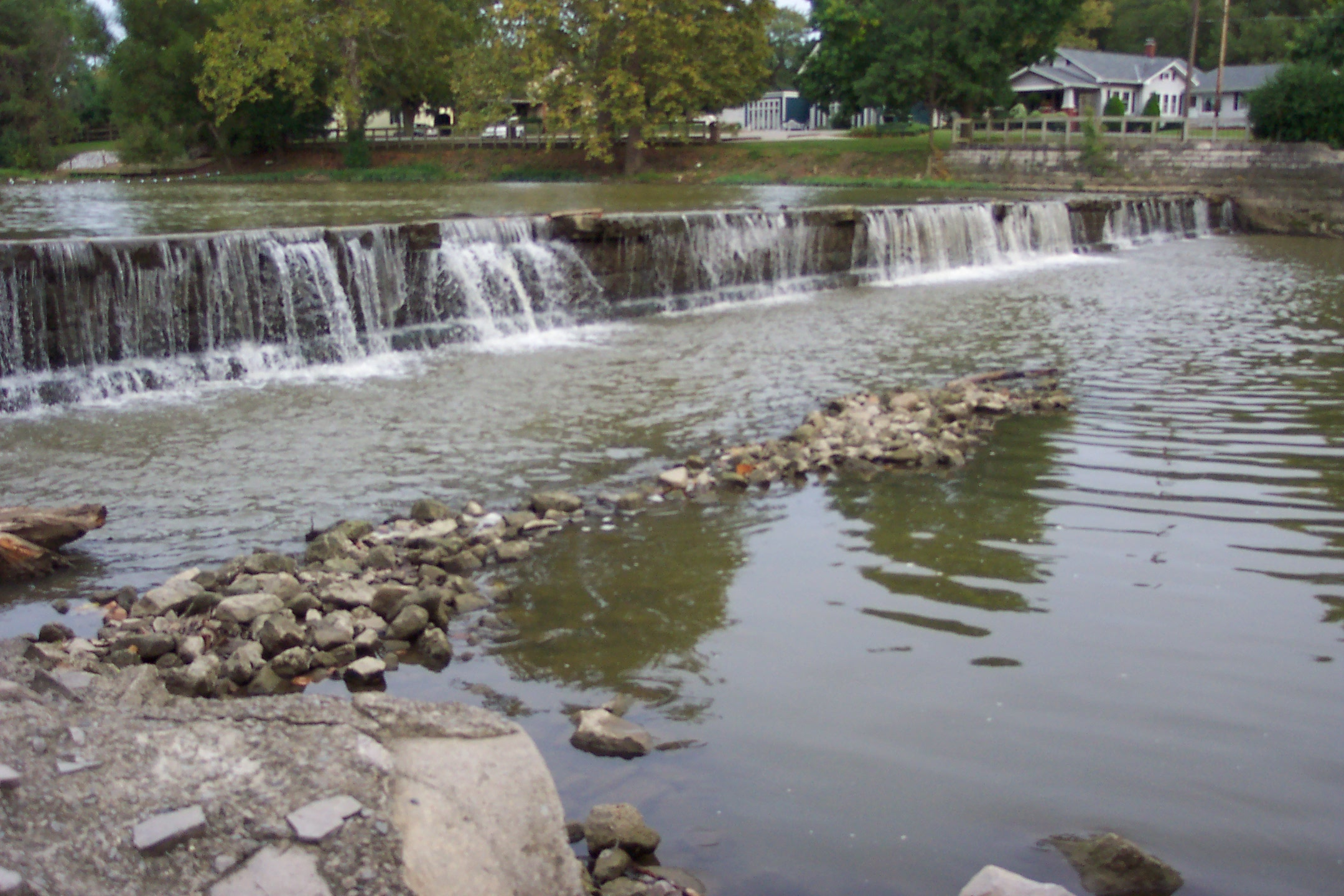
The weir at Riverside Park

Findlay is located at 41°02′34″N 83°38′32″W (41.042843, −83.642216).

According to the United States Census Bureau, the city has a total area of 19.25 square miles (49.86 km^{2}), of which 0.12 square miles (0.31 km^{2}) is covered by water.

The Blanchard River travels through Findlay, flowing east to west.

The Findlay Reservoir No. 2 is the largest above-ground reservoir in the state of Ohio, with a capacity around 5 billion US gallons (19,000,000 m^{3}) of water.

=== Climate ===
Climate data for Findlay, Ohio, 1991–2020 normals, extremes 1893–present
Month	Jan	Feb	Mar	Apr	May	Jun	Jul	Aug	Sep	Oct	Nov	Dec	Year
Record high °F (°C)	74 (23)	74 (23)	85 (29)	94 (34)	100 (38)	104 (40)	105 (41)	108 (42)	102 (39)	94 (34)	81 (27)	70 (21)	108 (42)
Mean maximum °F (°C)	56.4 (13.6)	59.6 (15.3)	70.1 (21.2)	80.2 (26.8)	87.7 (30.9)	92.9 (33.8)	93.1 (33.9)	91.5 (33.1)	89.6 (32.0)	82.6 (28.1)	68.9 (20.5)	59.4 (15.2)	94.5 (34.7)
Mean daily maximum °F (°C)	33.6 (0.9)	37.0 (2.8)	47.4 (8.6)	60.8 (16.0)	72.1 (22.3)	80.8 (27.1)	84.0 (28.9)	82.1 (27.8)	76.3 (24.6)	63.7 (17.6)	49.8 (9.9)	38.3 (3.5)	60.5 (15.8)
Daily mean °F (°C)	26.4 (−3.1)	29.2 (−1.6)	38.3 (3.5)	50.1 (10.1)	61.5 (16.4)	70.7 (21.5)	74.1 (23.4)	72.3 (22.4)	65.6 (18.7)	53.8 (12.1)	41.5 (5.3)	31.6 (−0.2)	51.3 (10.7)
Mean daily minimum °F (°C)	19.1 (−7.2)	21.4 (−5.9)	29.3 (−1.5)	39.5 (4.2)	50.8 (10.4)	60.6 (15.9)	64.1 (17.8)	62.4 (16.9)	55.0 (12.8)	43.9 (6.6)	33.2 (0.7)	24.9 (−3.9)	42.0 (5.6)
Mean minimum °F (°C)	−1.1 (−18.4)	3.6 (−15.8)	12.2 (−11.0)	24.9 (−3.9)	37.1 (2.8)	47.1 (8.4)	54.2 (12.3)	51.8 (11.0)	41.3 (5.2)	30.3 (−0.9)	19.3 (−7.1)	7.4 (−13.7)	−4.0 (−20.0)
Record low °F (°C)	−21 (−29)	−21 (−29)	−15 (−26)	7 (−14)	21 (−6)	33 (1)	38 (3)	34 (1)	24 (−4)	15 (−9)	−3 (−19)	−18 (−28)	−21 (−29)
Average precipitation inches (mm)	2.59 (66)	2.19 (56)	2.55 (65)	3.77 (96)	4.07 (103)	4.19 (106)	3.90 (99)	3.70 (94)	2.91 (74)	2.71 (69)	2.61 (66)	2.48 (63)	37.67 (957)
Average snowfall inches (cm)	8.1 (21)	4.3 (11)	4.3 (11)	0.9 (2.3)	0.0 (0.0)	0.0 (0.0)	0.0 (0.0)	0.0 (0.0)	0.0 (0.0)	0.2 (0.51)	1.4 (3.6)	4.6 (12)	23.8 (61.41)
Average precipitation days (≥ 0.01 in)	12.9	10.2	11.6	13.1	13.5	12.0	10.2	9.3	8.9	10.4	9.5	11.4	133.0
Average snowy days (≥ 0.1 in)	7.8	5.2	3.6	0.9	0.0	0.0	0.0	0.0	0.0	0.1	1.5	4.9	24.0
Source 1: NOAA
Source 2: National Weather Service

== Demographics ==
Historical population
Census	Pop.	Note	%±
1830	52		—
1840	469		801.9%
1850	1,256		167.8%
1860	2,467		96.4%
1870	3,315		34.4%
1880	4,633		39.8%
1890	18,553		300.5%
1900	17,613		−5.1%
1910	14,858		−15.6%
1920	17,021		14.6%
1930	19,363		13.8%
1940	20,228		4.5%
1950	23,845		17.9%
1960	30,344		27.3%
1970	35,800		18.0%
1980	35,533		−0.7%
1990	35,703		0.5%
2000	38,967		9.1%
2010	41,202		5.7%
2020	40,313		−2.2%
2025 (est.)	40,370		0.1%

=== 2020 census ===
As of the 2020 census, Findlay had a population of 40,313, a median age of 39.2 years, 19.8% of residents under the age of 18, and 18.9% of residents 65 years of age or older. The population density was 2,052.3 inhabitants per square mile (792.4/km^{2}), and the gender makeup was 48.2% male and 51.8% female (93.8 males per 100 females overall and 91.3 males per 100 females age 18 and over).

There were 17,655 households in Findlay, of which 23.7% had children under the age of 18 living in them. Of all households, 39.9% were married-couple households, 22.3% were households with a male householder and no spouse or partner present, and 29.6% were households with a female householder and no spouse or partner present. About 36.8% of all households were made up of individuals and 13.4% had someone living alone who was 65 years of age or older. There were 19,327 housing units, of which 8.7% were vacant; the homeowner vacancy rate was 1.7% and the rental vacancy rate was 10.1%.

99.8% of residents lived in urban areas, while 0.2% lived in rural areas.

Racial composition as of the 2020 census
Race	Number	Percent
White	34,697	86.1%
Black or African American	1,066	2.6%
American Indian and Alaska Native	103	0.3%
Asian	1,078	2.7%
Native Hawaiian and Other Pacific Islander	16	0.0%
Some other race	852	2.1%
Two or more races	2,501	6.2%
Hispanic or Latino (of any race)	2,714	6.7%

=== 2010 census ===
As of the census of 2010, 41,202 people, 17,354 households, and 10,329 families resided in the city. The population density was 2,153.8 inhabitants per square mile (831.6/km^{2}). There were 19,318 housing units at an average density of 1,009.8 per square mile (389.9/km^{2}). The racial makeup of the city was 91.2% White, 2.2% African American, 0.3% Native American, 2.5% Asian, 1.7% from other races, and 2.1% from two or more races. Hispanics or Latinos of any race were 5.7% of the population.

Of the 17,354 households, 28.3% had children under 18 living with them, 43.1% were married couples living together, 11.8% had a female householder with no husband present, 4.6% had a male householder with no wife present, and 40.5% were not families. About 32.6% of all households were made up of individuals, and 10.9% had someone living alone who was 65 or older. The average household size was 2.29, and the average family size was 2.87.

The median age in the city was 35.9 years. The age distribution was 22.2% under 18; 12.9% from 18 to 24; 25.5% from 25 to 44; 25.0% from 45 to 64; and 14.5% were 65 years of age or older. The gender makeup of the city was 47.6% male and 52.4% female.

=== 2000 census ===
As of the census of 2000, 38,967 people, 15,905 households, and 10,004 families were living in the city. The population density was 2,266.3 inhabitants per square mile (875.0/km^{2}). The 17,152 housing units had an average density of 997.6 per square mile (385.2/km^{2}). The racial makeup of the city was 93.7% White, 1.4% African American, 0.19% Native American, 1.76% Asian, 1.69% from other races, and 1.26% from two or more races. Hispanics or Latinos of any race were 3.95% of the population.

Of the 15,905 households, 29.2% had children under 18 living with them, 49.3% were married couples living together, 9.9% had a female householder with no husband present, and 37.1% were not families. Around 30.2% of all households were made up of individuals, and 10.2% had someone living alone who was 65 years or older. The average household size was 2.36, and the average family size was 2.93.

In the city, the age distribution was 23.8% under 18, 11.9% from 18 to 24, 28.7% from 25 to 44, 21.4% from 45 to 64, and 14.2% who were 65 or older. The median age was 35 years. For every 100 females, there were 91.3 males. For every 100 females 18 and over, there were 87.9 males.

The median income for a household in the city was $40,883, and for a family was $49,986. Males had a median income of $36,150 versus $23,797 for females. The per capita income for the city was $21,328. About 5.9% of families and 9.1% of the population were below the poverty line, including 11.0% of those under 18 and 6.1% of those 65 or over.

== Economy ==
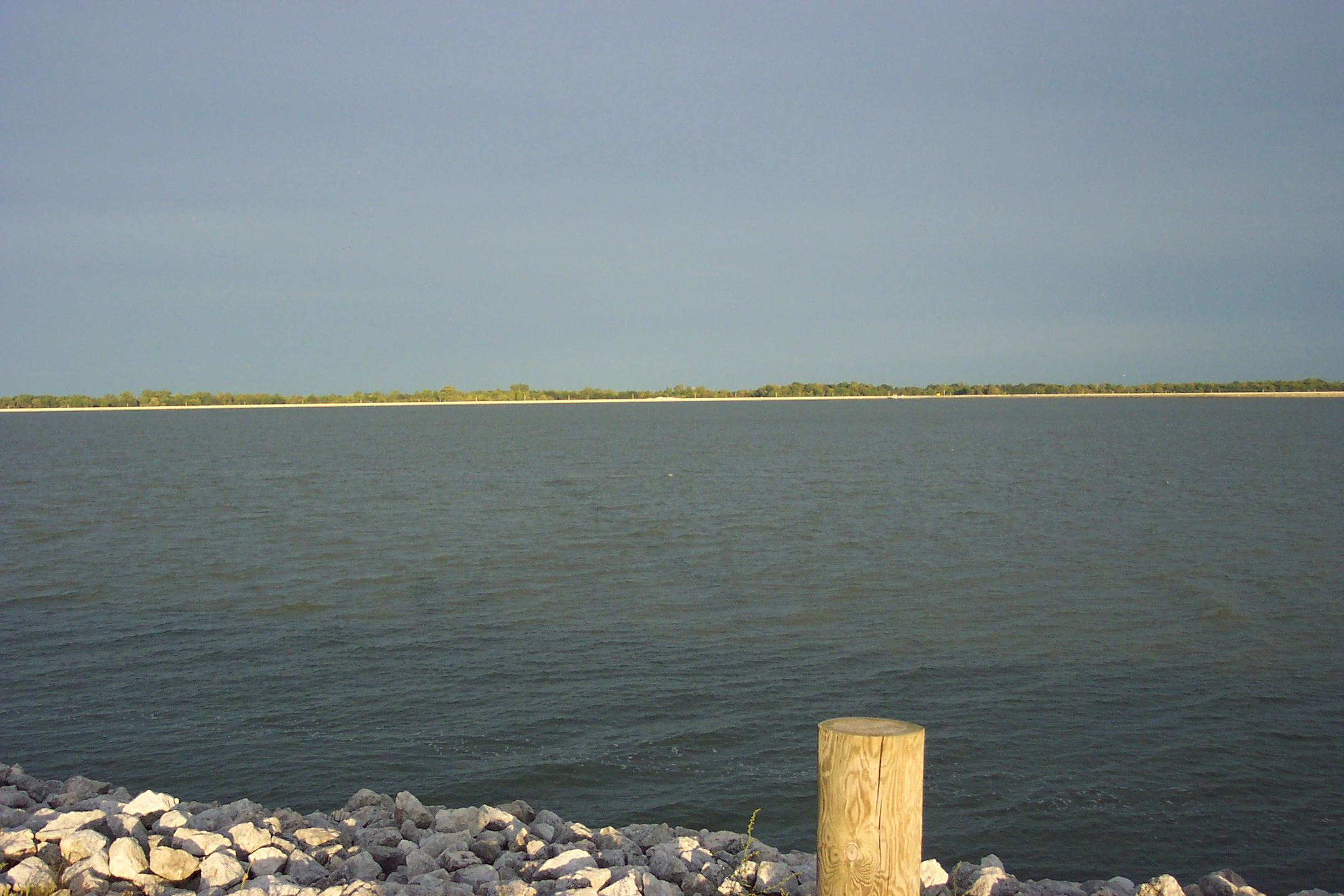
Findlay Reservoir No. 2, the largest above-ground reservoir in the state

Findlay was the headquarters of the Cooper Tire & Rubber Company, founded in 1914, which specializes in the design, manufacture, marketing, and sales of replacement automobile and truck tires, and subsidiaries that specialize in medium truck, motorcycle, and racing tires. Cooper Tire was acquired by Goodyear Tire & Rubber Company in 2021.

Findlay was the longtime headquarters of the Marathon Oil Corporation from 1905 until 1990 when it moved its offices to Houston, Texas. Marathon Petroleum Company, a former subsidiary of Marathon Oil, maintained its main office in Findlay after Marathon Oil moved. On July 1, 2011, Marathon Petroleum became an independent entity, with headquarters in Findlay.

Findlay is home to the Whirlpool dishwasher manufacturing plant and distribution center. This plant is considered to be the largest dishwasher plant in the world (based on production).

Findlay is home to several other major distribution centers, including Best Buy, Lowe's, and Campbell's.

=== Largest employers ===
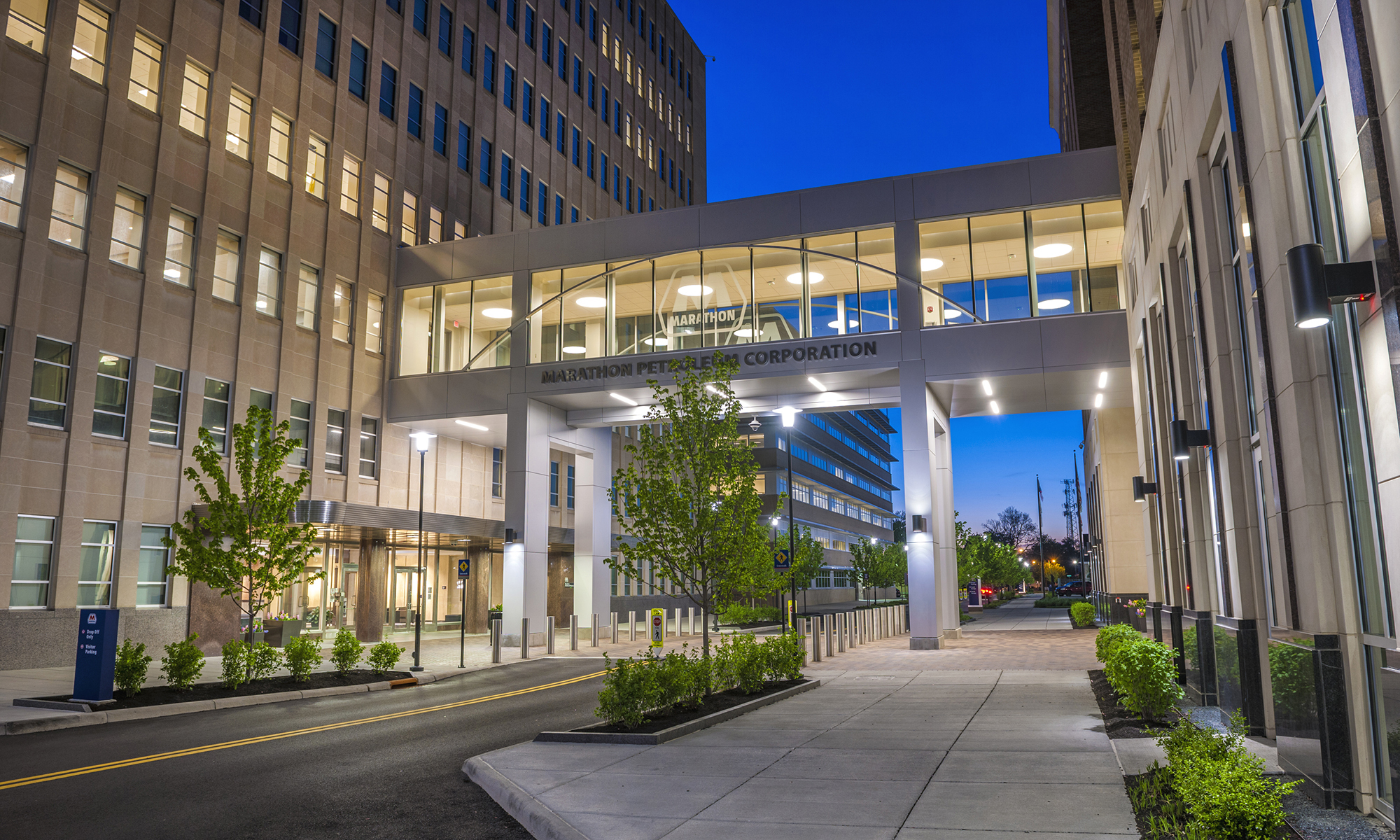
Marathon Petroleum's headquarters in downtown Findlay

According to the City of Findlay 2024 Annual Comprehensive Financial Report, the following companies are the top employers in the city:

#	Employer	Number of employees
1	Blanchard Valley Regional Health Center	3,165
2	Marathon Petroleum Corporation	2,159
3	Whirlpool Corporation	1,930
4	Goodyear	895
5	Findlay City Schools	865
6	The University of Findlay	548
7	Lowe's Distribution Center	511
8	Kohl's Distribution Center	507
9	Hancock County	466
10	Ball Metal	449

== Arts and culture ==
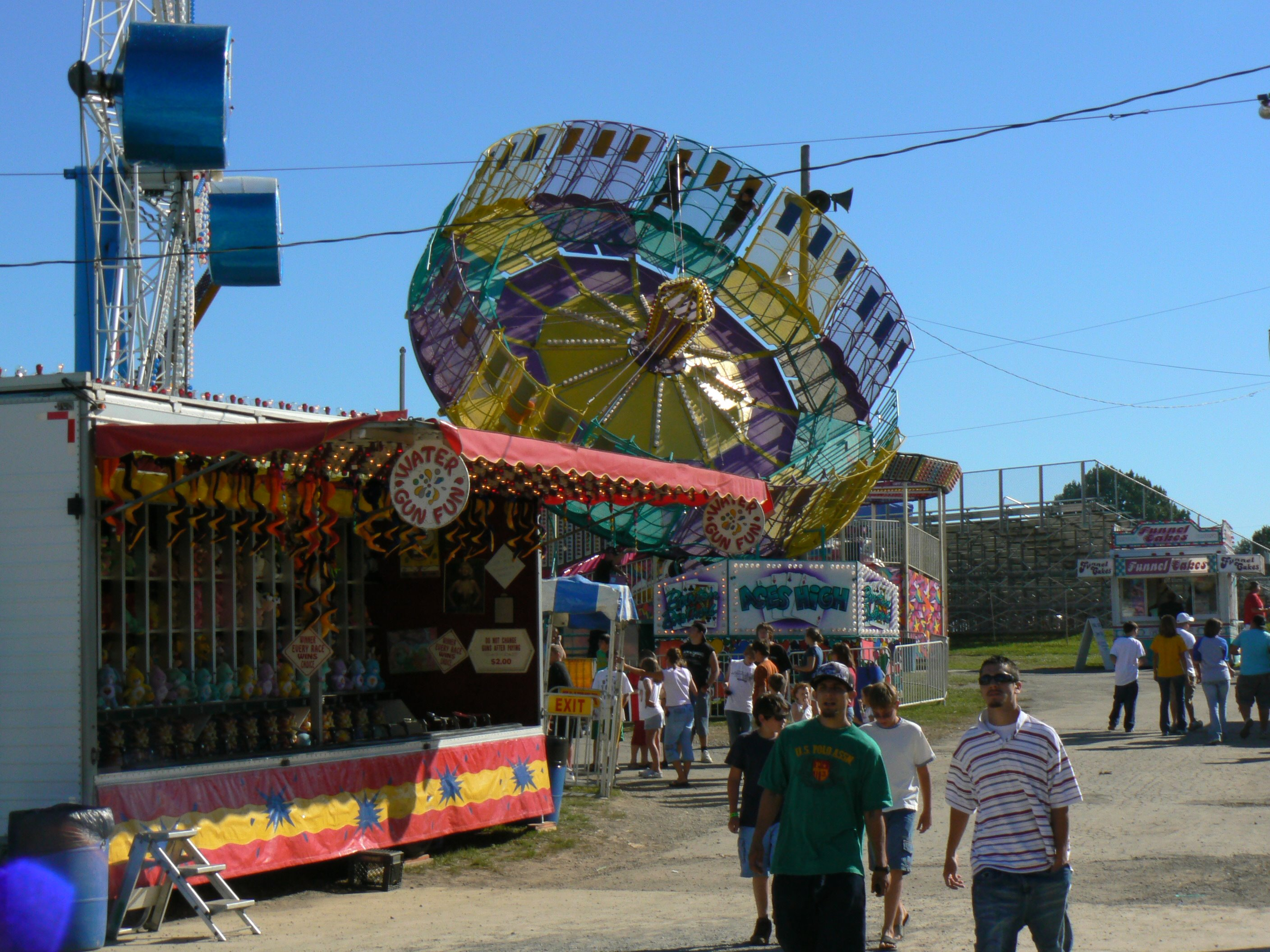
The Hancock County Fair

Hancock County hosts a variety of annual events that celebrate local culture, including the Hancock County Fair. In June, the city hosts Boogie on the Block featuring music and entertainment In August it hosts the Flag City BalloonFest hot air balloon festival. Fall events include Oktoberfest and a Halloween parade.

== Sports ==
Findlay has previously hosted multiple professional sports teams in minor league baseball, as well as amateur and semi-professional hockey. The Findlay Browns was the final nickname of the minor league baseball teams based in Findlay between 1895 and 1941. Findlay teams played as members of the Interstate League in 1895, Buckeye League in 1915 and Ohio State League from 1937 to 1941. The Findlay Browns were an affiliate of the St. Louis Browns in 1937 and 1938. For hockey, the city was home to the Findlay Freedom from 2006 to 2008. Beginning in 2008, the Findlay Grrrowl played Junior A hockey at the Cube Ice Arena at the Hancock Recreation Center. In 2009, the Grrrowl won the United Junior Hockey League's only championship beating the Jamestown Jets two games to one. The UJHL and an attempted successor folded the next year.

Collegiate sports in Findlay take place at the University of Findlay, which participates in Division II athletics as a member of the Great Midwest Athletic Conference.

== Government ==
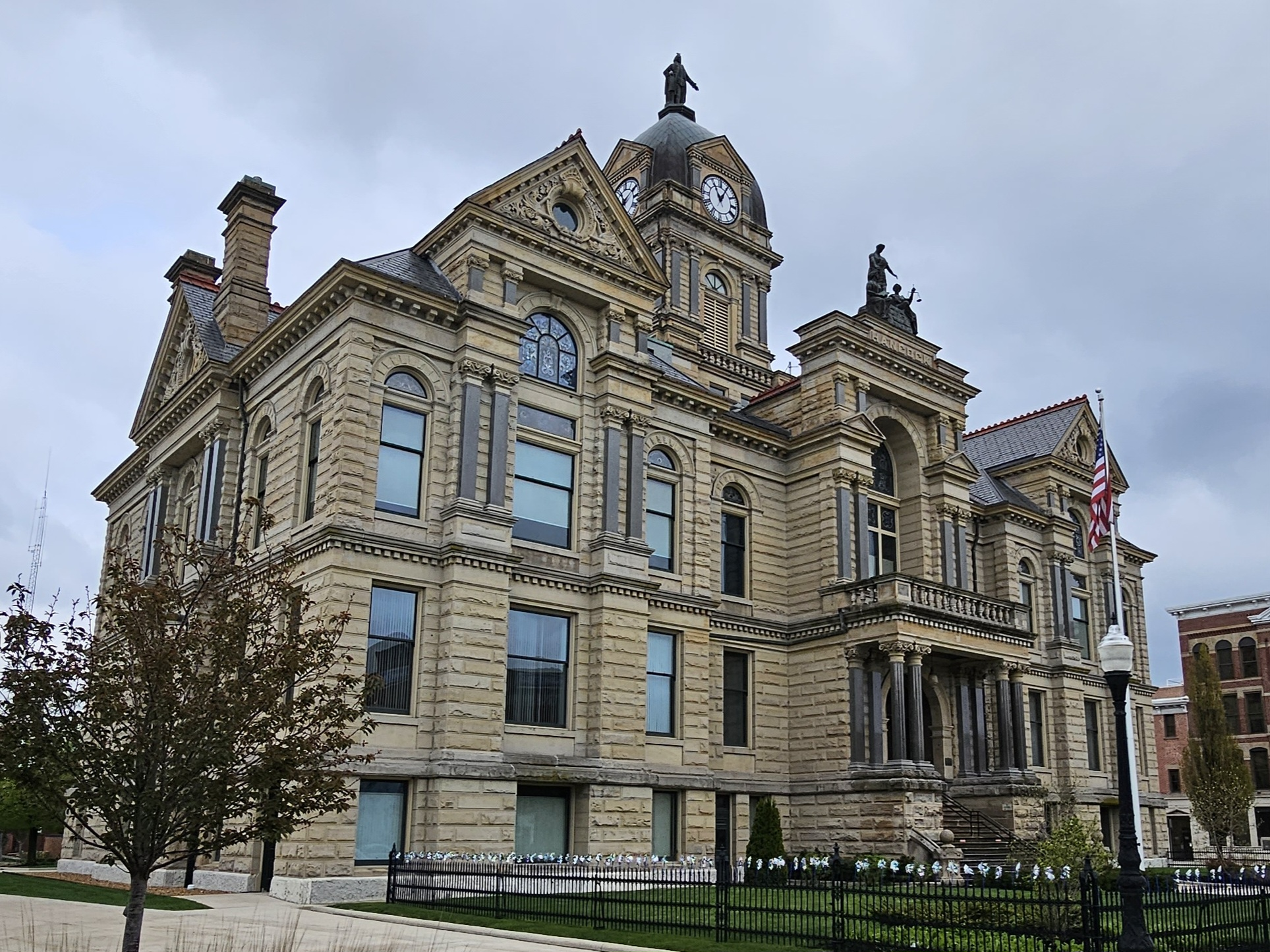
Hancock County Courthouse in Findlay

The city is administered by a mayor and a city council with the city council being composed of the president of council, seven ward representatives, and three representatives elected at-large. The mayor appoints the director of public safety and service, while the people elect the auditor, treasurer, law director, and two municipal court judges.

The current mayor, Christina Muryn, was first elected in 2019 and then reelected in 2023, with her second four-year term beginning on January 1, 2024.

== Education ==
=== Primary and secondary ===
Three intermediate (3–5) buildings and three primary (K–2) buildings are within the Findlay City School District.

For decades, students attended one of three junior high schools: Donnell (Atoms), Central (Spartans), or Glenwood (Eagles). The original Donnell School building located on Baldwin Avenue was razed in 2012 to make room for the construction of a new building, which began usage in January 2013. Another new school built directly behind the original Glenwood building on North Main Street officially opened and began usage in January 2013. The building known as Central, located on West Main Cross, was originally Findlay's high school (until the current high school was built in 1963). Once the two new middle schools were opened, part of Central was razed, leaving only the auditorium. A new Performing Arts Center (funded mainly by Marathon Petroleum) was constructed by refurbishing and renovating Central's auditorium, finishing in December 2015.

Findlay High School is a comprehensive high school with an enrollment of 1,632 students in grades 9–12. Of the 130 professional staff, 87 have master's degrees or beyond. Accreditation has been granted by AdvancEd Accreditation.

=== Postsecondary ===
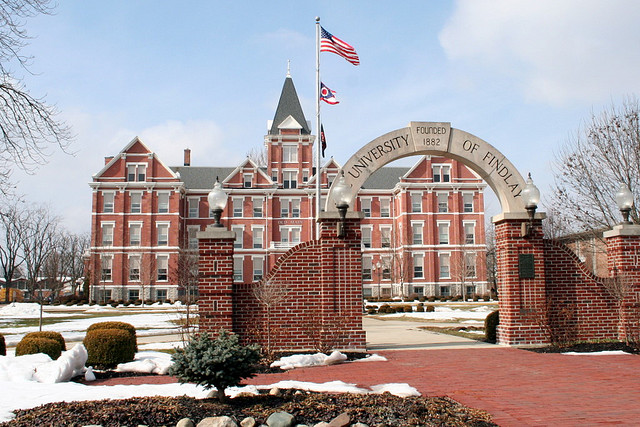
University of Findlay's Old Main

The city is home to the University of Findlay, a private liberal arts college with an enrollment of over 4,100 students, and Owens Community College, a state school with an enrollment of 2,391 students. The University of Findlay is best known for its programs in Education (undergraduate and Master's) and the equestrian studies programs. Students enrolled in the preveterinary or western equestrian studies have access to a 152-acre (62 ha) farm operated by the university. Those students who are pursuing a degree in English equestrian studies have access to a separate rural facility composed of 32 acres (13 ha), which includes the University Equine Veterinary Services Inc.

Winebrenner Theological Seminary also makes its home in Findlay, adjacent to the university. Findlay also had a branch location of Brown Mackie College prior to 2017.

=== Public library ===
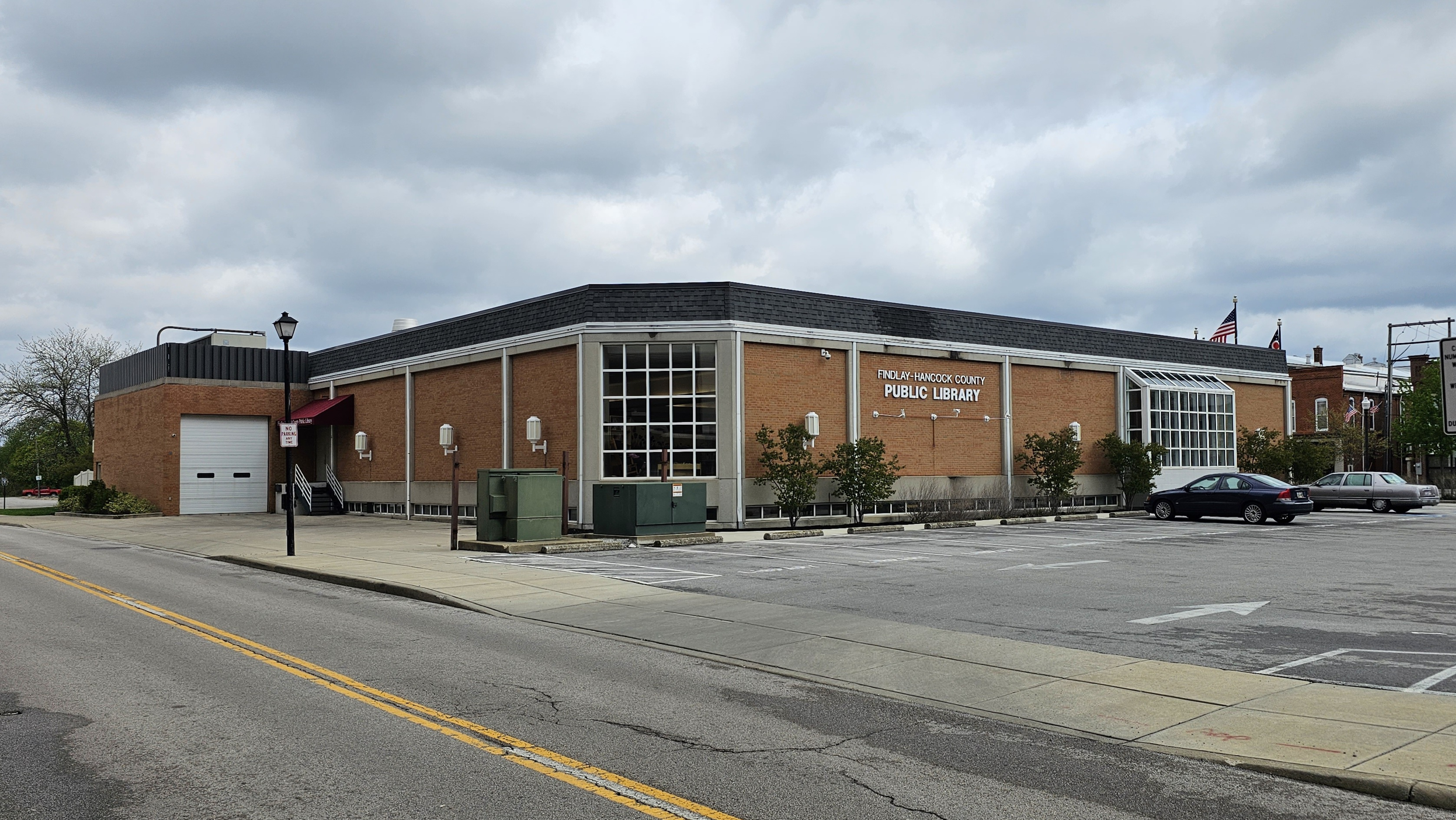
The main branch of the Findlay-Hancock County Public Library

The city has the main branch of the Findlay-Hancock County Public Library. The library was established on April 16, 1888, and was originally housed in the Hancock County Courthouse basement until it was able to move into an old post office building in 1935. The main library building was renovated in 1991, and again in 2009 after a major flood. The library announced in March 2019 it would end the process of charging late fees.

== Infrastructure ==
=== Transportation ===
Findlay Airport is located two nautical miles (2.3 mi; 3.7 km) south-southwest of Findlay's central business district.

Interstate 75, US 68 (northern terminus), and US 224 are major highways that pass through the city. State routes in the city of Findlay include: Ohio State Route 12, Ohio State Route 15, Ohio State Route 568, and Ohio State Route 37.

Historically, the Baltimore & Ohio, the New York Central, and the Nickel Plate Road operated passenger train service through Findlay. The last trains were the Nickel Plate's St. Louis–Muncie–Cleveland trains (#9, Blue Arrow westbound and #10, Blue Dart eastbound). These trains ended in 1959.

== Notable people ==
- Peggy Kirk Bell, golfer, winner of the 1949 Titleholders Championship
- Willard Harrison Bennett, inventor of the radio frequency mass spectrometer
- Joshua Brodbeck, international concert organist
- Aaron Craft, college basketball player for Ohio State, Big Ten leader in steals
- Gavin Creel, Tony Award-winning Broadway actor and singer
- Russel Crouse, Broadway playwright, The Sound of Music, State of the Union and Call Me Madam
- Jo Ann Davidson, Ohio's first female Speaker of the House
- James C. Donnell, president of The Ohio Oil Company (now Marathon Oil)
- Marie Dressler, actress and silent film star
- Tennyson Guyer, Congressman
- Ray Harroun, race car developer and driver, and first Indianapolis 500 winner
- Cliff Hite, Ohio state senator, high school football coach of Ben Roethlisberger
- Michael Holmes, saxophonist
- Josh Huston, former kicker in the National Football League (NFL)
- Grant "Home Run" Johnson, Negro league baseball player and manager
- Yuki Kamifuku, professional wrestler for Tokyo Joshi Pro Wrestling
- John Kidd, former punter in the NFL
- Dave Laut, shot-putter who won bronze at the 1984 Summer Olympics
- Mark Metcalf, actor
- Marilyn Miller, Broadway star of the 1920s
- William Mungen, U.S. Representative, lawyer, Union Army colonel
- Dan O'Brien, cattleman and author
- Michael G. Oxley, Congressman (1981–2006), co-author of Sarbanes–Oxley Act, Executive Vice President of NASDAQ
- Lamont Paris, men's college basketball coach at University of South Carolina
- Tot Pressnell, pitcher for the Brooklyn Dodgers and Chicago Cubs
- James Purdy, novelist, short-story writer, poet, and playwright
- Howard Taylor Ricketts, pathologist who discovered the causative agent of Rocky Mountain spotted fever, Rickettsia rickettsii, which was also named after him
- Ben Roethlisberger, former quarterback in the NFL for the Pittsburgh Steelers
- Mike Streicher, racing driver
- Philip Sugden, artist and painter
- Tell Taylor, composer of "Down by the Old Mill Stream"
- Landon Tewers, musician known for The Plot In You
- Wilson Vance (1845–1911), American Civil War soldier awarded the Medal of Honor
- Chad Zerbe, former pitcher for the San Francisco Giants

== Friendship city ==
The city currently has a friendship city agreement with Kawaguchi, Saitama, which began on August 16, 2018.
