= Dan O'Brien (author) =

American novelist

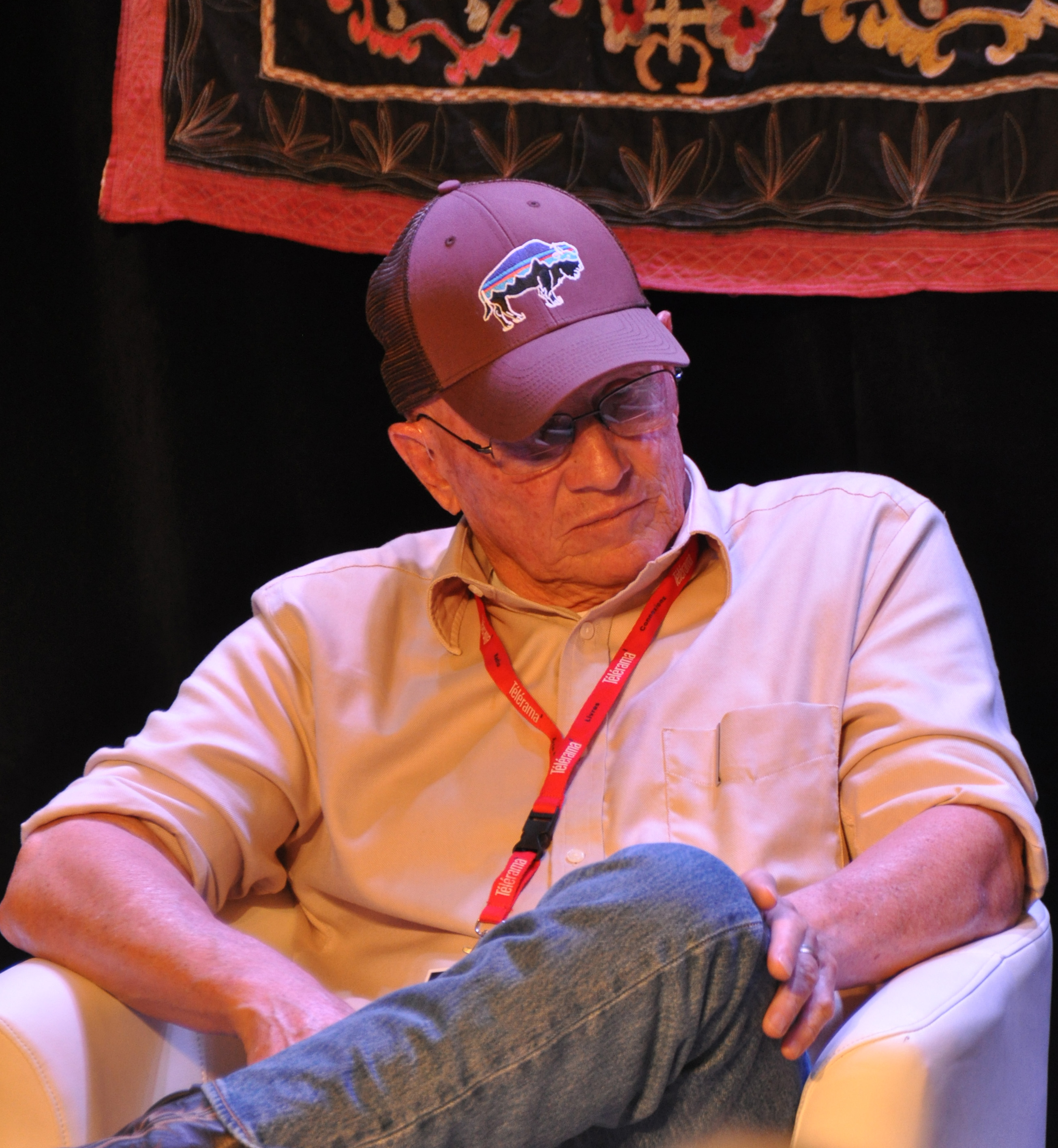
- Daniel Hosler O'Brien in 2015
- Born: Daniel Hosler O'Brien; November 23, 1947 (age 78); Findlay, Ohio, U.S.
- Education: Findlay High School; Michigan Technological University; Findlay College (BS); University of South Dakota (MA); Bowling Green State University (MFA)
- Occupations: Wildlife biologist; author; rancher
- Spouse: Jill

Daniel Hosler O'Brien (born November 23, 1947, in Findlay, Ohio) is an American author, wildlife biologist, and rancher.

== Biography ==
Dan O'Brien was born in Findlay, Ohio, on November 23, 1947. He attended Findlay High School and graduated in 1966. He attended Michigan Technological University to play football and graduated with a BS degree in Math and Business from Findlay College in 1970 where he was the chairman of the first campus Earth Day. He earned an MA in English Literature from the University of South Dakota in 1973 where he studied under Frederick Manfred. He earned an MFA from Bowling Green State University in 1974, worked as a biologist and wrote for a few years before entering the PhD program at Denver University. When he won the prestigious Iowa Short Fiction in 1986 he gave up academics except for occasional short term teaching jobs. O'Brien continued to write and work as an endangered species biologist for the South Dakota Department of Game Fish and Parks and later the Peregrine Fund. In the late 1990s, he began to convert his small cattle ranch in South Dakota to a buffalo ranch. In 2001, he founded Wild Idea Buffalo Company and Sustainable Harvest Alliance to produce large landscape, grass-fed and field-harvest buffalo to supply high quality and sustainable buffalo meat to people interested in human health and the health of the American Great Plains. He now raises buffalo and lives on the Cheyenne River Ranch in western South Dakota with his wife Jill. Dan O'Brien is the winner of the Iowa Short Fiction Award, two National Endowment for the Arts Grants for fiction, A Bush Foundation Award for writing, a Spur Award, two Wrangler Awards from the National cowboy Hall of Fame, and an honorary PhD from the University of South Dakota. His books have been translated into seven foreign languages and his essays, reviews, and short stories have been published in many periodicals including, Redbook, New York Times Magazine, FYI. New York Times Book Review.

O'Brien appeared in the 2023 Ken Burns documentary The American Buffalo.

== Bibliography ==
=== Short fiction ===
- Eminent Domain, 1987

=== Novels ===
- Spirit of the Hills, 1988
- In the Center of the Nation, 1991
- Brendan Prairie, 1996
- The Contract Surgeon: A Novel, 1999
- The Indian Agent: A Novel, 2004
- Stolen Horses, 2010

=== Memoirs ===
- The Rites of Autumn: a Falconer's Journey Across the American West, 1988
- Equinox: Life, Loves, and Birds of Prey, 1997
- Buffalo for The Broken Heart, 2001
- Wild Idea: Buffalo and Family in a Difficult Land, 2014

=== Essays ===
- Great Plains (with Michael Forsberg), 2009
- Great Plains Bison, 2017
