= Tudor Watches =

Swiss watchmaker founded by Hans Wilsdorf

Montres Tudor SA
- Type: Subsidiary
- Industry: Watchmaking
- Founded: 1926; 100 years ago in Geneva, Switzerland
- Founder: Hans Wilsdorf
- Headquarters: Geneva, Switzerland
- Production output: c. 200,000 (2015)
- Number of employees: 194 (2016)
- Parent: Hans Wilsdorf Foundation
- Website: tudorwatch.com

Montres Tudor SA, or simply Tudor, is a Swiss watchmaker based in Geneva, Switzerland. Registered in 1926 by Hans Wilsdorf, founder of Rolex, the brand remains a sister company to Rolex; both companies are owned by the Hans Wilsdorf Foundation. Tudor was initially known for watches produced for the military and professional divers. From the 1960s to 1980s, several navies issued Tudor Submariners to their divers, including the US Navy SEALs and the French Marine Nationale.

== History ==
=== Origins ===
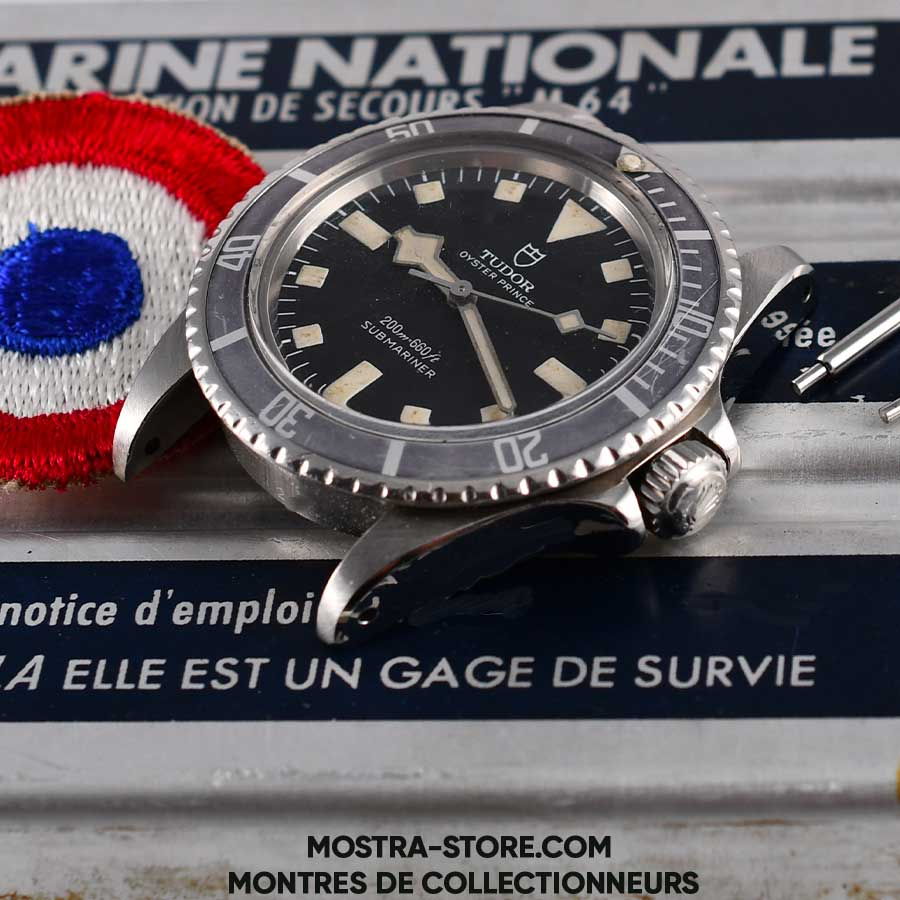
1979 Tudor Submariner issued to the French Marine Nationale showcasing the brand's trademark "snowflake" handset

The Tudor trademark was registered in 1926 by Swiss watchmaking company Veuve de Philippe Hüther on behalf of Hans Wilsdorf, founder of Rolex watches. In 1936, Wilsdorf took it over and went on to found the company Montres Tudor SA in 1946.

Tudor's purpose was to offer a more affordable watch than Rolex while maintaining Rolex-like quality. Tudor watches were originally equipped with off-the-shelf movements paired with Rolex cases and bracelets, allowing Tudor to provide reliability and quality while achieving its price goals.

Tudor debuted its Oyster collection in the mid-forties, featuring a waterproof Oyster case previously exclusive to Rolex. In 1952, Tudor released its first self-winding model, the Prince, which used a Rolex self-winding mechanism. Twenty-six Tudor Oyster Princes were included in the British North Greenland expedition of 1952–1954.

The adoption of the Oyster case and self-winding rotor facilitated Tudor's move into the production of tool watches. The French Navy was involved in field research for a Tudor diving watch; from the 1960s to the mid-1980s, Tudor tool watches were supplied to the French Navy in bulk without bracelets so military-issued straps could be used instead. Tudor launched its first diving watch in 1954, the Oyster Prince Submariner, waterproof to 100 metres, which increased to 200 metres in 1958.

Over the years the Submariner line adopted various features such as the "big crown" and "snowflake hands" (which have been reintroduced in for Tudor's current catalogue). In 1964, Tudor began producing an Oyster Prince Submariner specifically for the US Navy. 1957 saw the launch of the Tudor Advisor, which incorporated an alarm complication, the first Oyster model to amplify sound. Later in 1969 this was changed to a more ‘traditional’ alarm case with an external case back to increase its volume.

In 1970, Tudor released its first chronograph, the Oysterdate, with a manually wound Valjoux mechanical calibre 7734 and cam chronograph function. The second series, introduced in 1971, was nicknamed "Montecarlo" because its dial resembles a roulette wheel. The third series, Oysterdate "Big Block", debuted in 1976, was the first Tudor chronograph to introduce a self-winding movement. The Tudor Monarch collection launched in 1991 and the Tudor Hydronaut in 1999.

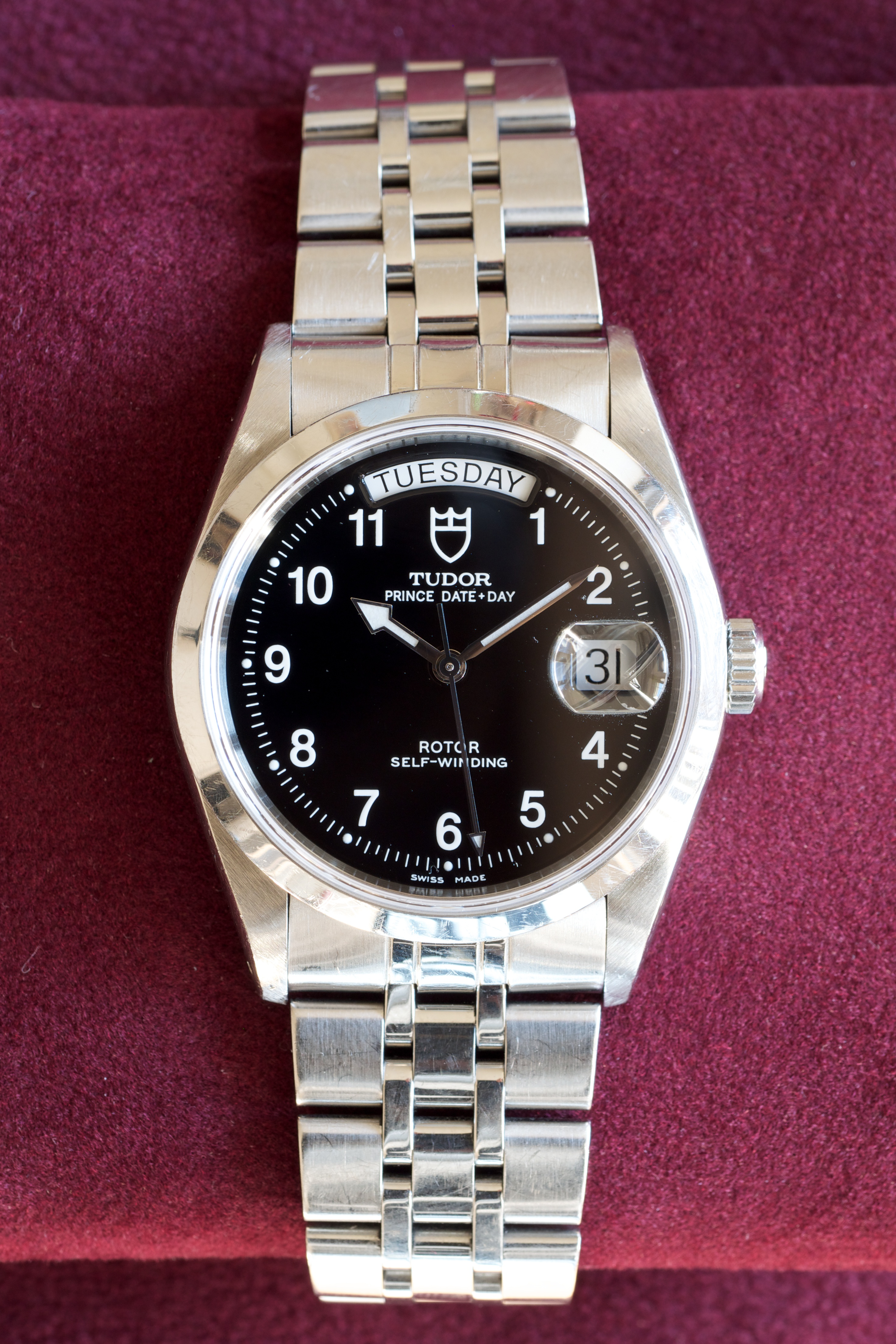
Tudor Date-Day, part of the Tudor Glamour series under the Classic line

=== Recent Tudor models ===
In 2009, Tudor instigated a major brand relaunch with new product lines: first, the Tudor Grantour Chronograph and Tudor Glamour collection of classic watches, followed in 2010 by the Heritage Chrono, inspired by the Tudor “Montecarlo” from the 1970s. The Heritage Chrono was the first of the Tudor Heritage line of watches designed to echo Tudor's best-known vintage models and also the first to come with an additional fabric strap.

2011 saw the release of the Tudor Heritage Advisor alarm watch, the Fastrider Chronograph, and the Clair de Rose collection for women. In 2012, the focus was on diver watches, with the Heritage Black Bay, a reinterpretation of early Tudor Submariner models, and the Pelagos diver watch. The Pelagos has a 42 mm titanium case, the first titanium watch from the Rolex group, and is waterproof to 500 metres. In 2013, the Heritage Black Bay won the Revival prize at the Grand Prix d’Horlogerie de Genève and the Pelagos won the “Sports Watch” prize in 2015. In 2014, Tudor expanded the Heritage collection with the Ranger, a military-style watch similar to a 1967 model. The year also saw the launch of the Tudor Style line of men's and women's dress watches.

In 2015, Tudor launched the North Flag, named for a key moment in Tudor's history, the British North Greenland Expedition. The North Flag was the first Tudor model to be fitted with an in-house movement, calibre MT5621. During 2016 and 2017, “Manufacture” movements were introduced across all of Tudor's sport watches and the Black Bay line of diver's watches was broadened. In 2018, Tudor announced the Heritage Black Bay GMT at the Baselworld fair. It was the first Heritage Black Bay model to have the GMT function with the in-house, COSC-certified MT5652 movement. The blue-red bezel design is also a homage to the Rolex GMT Master Pepsi model from their sibling brand Rolex. Also launched at Baselworld 2018 were the 1926 and Black Bay 58, two heritage-inspired lines named after the year Tudor was trademarked and the year the first 200-meter water-resistant Tudor Submariner was released, respectively.

=== Current models ===
Tudor currently offers five categories of watches with many different sub-models:

- Tudor Black Bay Line (heritage-inspired dive watch with GMT, bronze, silver, two-tone, and chronograph complications)
- Sports Watches (Tudor Ranger, Tudor Royal, and Pelagos FXD)
- Classic Watches (Tudor 1926 and Clair de Rose)
- Diving Watches (Tudor Pelagos line)
- Women's Watches

== Watchmaking and features ==
=== Tudor-manufactured movements ===
Some movements used in Tudor classic watches are manufactured by the Swiss companies ETA, Sellita or Valjoux, but in 2015, Tudor launched its first in-house movement for its Pelagos and North Flag watches. In 2017, Tudor entered into a cooperative agreement with Breitling, providing the MT5612 movement from the Tudor Pelagos for Breitling's Superocean Heritage watch, while in return Breitling produces the Tudor Calibre MT5813 movement for use in the new Tudor Heritage Chronograph, based on the Breitling B01.

Tudor produces variants of its 2015 "Manufacture Calibre": the MT 5601 was developed specifically for the Black Bay Bronze model and is slightly larger in diameter and displays hours, minutes and seconds functions, and the MT5602 was developed for the Black Bay and the Black Bay Dark models, and also displays hours, minutes and seconds.

Caliber MT5402 is a smaller and thinner version of the 5602, developed for the Black Bay 58 line. As of its release in 2018, it is only available without date display and carries the same specs of movement speed, material use, structure and power reserve as the 5602. As of 2021, it also exists as MT5400, a slightly modified size version for the Black Bay 58 models with open case back to fit the sapphire case-back size.

On May 25, 2021, Tudor announced their Manufacture Calibre MT5602-1U alongside their new Black Bay Ceramic timepiece. The movement is almost entirely black, with a black tungsten rotor, a 70-hour power reserve, and a silicon hairspring. It is the company's first METAS Master Chronometer timepiece, able to function within a tolerance range of 0/+5 seconds per day.

Tudor in-house mechanical movements typically function within a tolerance range of -4/+6 seconds per day. This average daily rate level is in line with COSC Chronometer standards, which Tudor often certifies its movements to.

=== Fabric straps ===
Fabric straps were used by NATO forces from the mid-twentieth century as a functional and hardwearing alternative to leather and metal watch bracelets; however, the two-piece strap now known as the "NATO strap" debuted in the British Ministry of Defence in 1973. Military watch bands had to be hardwearing and secure, and with the additions of spring bars and an added nylon strap, the NATO strap provided the best security. They were also used by many professional divers, since leather straps do not suit water, and they could be adapted to fit over a diving suit more easily than metal bracelets. The NATO strap was initially only available in a 20mm wide ‘Admiralty Grey’ nylon variety, but as the style gained popularity, the different British military regiments began producing straps in all manner of regimental colors. Over time, military men began to customize their watch straps, taking on the colors of the regiments they were in, creating the colorful stripes NATO straps are now often known for.

In the early 2000s, sports watches with fabric straps became popular. At the 2010 launch of the Heritage Chrono watch, Tudor supplied both a metal bracelet and a fabric strap with the watch. Tudor's fabric straps are woven by a passementerie manufacturer near St.-Etienne, the centre of French silk weaving since the 15th century. The same firm also makes ribbons for Vatican medals as well as decorative trimmings for haute couture houses, including Chanel.

== Branding ==
Tudor rose

The first Tudor watches produced in the 1920s and 1930s bore a Tudor signature on the dial, with the horizontal bar of the T lengthened above the other letters; on some rare pieces, the name Rolex also appears. Around 1936, the logo changed to the name in Gothic characters accompanied by a shield bearing the Tudor rose, the emblem of the English Tudor dynasty. In 1947, one year after the official launch of Tudor Montres SA, the shield was removed and the rose appeared alone with the brand name. From 1969 only the shield was used; the shield logo remains on all Tudor watches, while the rose is now used on the winding crowns.

== Marketing and distribution ==
=== Advertising campaigns ===
In 1953, Tudor launched a campaign based on robustness tests of the Oyster Prince and its endurance in difficult conditions. The adverts included a watch worn by a coal miner during 252 hours of hand excavation, a watch subjected to the vibrations of a pneumatic drill for 30 hours worn by a stone cutter for three months, a watch worn for a month while riveting metal girders in metal construction, and a watch worn by a motorbike racer over a distance of 1,000 miles. As time went by, Tudor began narrowing its focus on watches with a more technical design inspired by dangerous professions. These watches had particular functional features, like diver models with date or chronograph function. The individuals selected for the Tudor Prince Submariner and Tudor Prince Date-Day advertising campaigns were not well-known celebrities, but rather everyday people chosen due to their profession. They included rescue divers, mining engineers and rally drivers, all photographed with their equipment.

A major brand relaunch took place in 2009, with a new product line, Tudor Grantour, featuring a new advertising campaign "Designed for performance. Engineered for elegance." The marketing placed a new emphasis on style, in contrast with the 1980s communications based on strength and durability. In 2017, the "Born To Dare" campaign was launched, featuring David Beckham, Lady Gaga, and Jay Chou and a partnership with the New Zealand rugby team All Blacks and their player Beauden Barrett.

Tudor acted as official timekeeper at the 2018 Rugby World Cup Sevens, held in San Francisco and the 2019 Rugby World Cup, held in Japan. Tudor reprised its role as Official Timekeeper and was also a main sponsor of the Rugby Union World Cup held in France in September/October 2023

In 2024, Tudor became an official partner of the Racing Bulls VCARB 02 Formula 1 team, with the Tudor branding visible on the rear wing and on the drivers racing suits.

=== Distribution ===
Tudor watches are marketed and sold in many countries around the world including the United States; Australia; Canada; India; Mexico; South Africa; some countries in Europe; South Asia; the Middle East; and countries in South America, particularly Brazil, Argentina, and Venezuela. Montres Tudor SA discontinued sales in the US and UK in the early 2000s, resuming in the US in 2013 and the UK in 2014.
