= Luke Montgomery (American football) =

American football player (born 2004)

No. 51 – Ohio State Buckeyes
- Position: Guard
- Class: Senior

Personal information
- Born: October 5, 2004 (age 22); Ohio, U.S.
- Listed height: 6 ft 5 in (1.96 m)
- Listed weight: 312 lb (142 kg)

Career information
- High school: Findlay (Findlay, Ohio)
- College: Ohio State (2023–present)

Awards and highlights
- CFP national champion (2024); Second-team All-Big Ten (2025)
- Stats at ESPN

Luke Montgomery (born October 5, 2004) is an American college football guard for the Ohio State Buckeyes.

== Early life ==
Montgomery attended Findlay High School in Findlay, Ohio. Coming out of high school, he was rated as a four-star recruit and committed to play college football for Ohio State over other offers such as Michigan, Notre Dame, Clemson, Penn State and Oklahoma.

== College career ==
As a freshman in 2023, Montgomery appeared in seven games. At the end on the regular season and the start of the 2024–25 College Football Playoff, he rotated in on the offensive line and competed for a starting role. During the first two rounds of the playoffs, Montgomery played in 29 snaps in the win over Tennessee, and 31 snaps in the victory versus Oregon. In the 2025 Cotton Bowl Classic, he made his first collegiate start in a win over Texas, helping the Buckeyes advance to the National Championship. He finished the 2024 season, mainly coming off the bench as a rotational offensive lineman, while also making two starts. Montgomery is set to be the team's starting left guard in 2025.

== Personal life ==
Montgomery is the brother of four-star quarterback Ryan Montgomery, who committed to play for the Georgia Bulldogs.
