= Findlay City School District =

School district in Ohio

- Findlay, Ohio

Students and staff
- District mascot: Tommy Trojan
- Colors: Blue and Gold

Other information
- Website: fcs.org

Findlay City School District is a school district serving students in Findlay, Ohio and surrounding communities.

== Schools ==
=== Elementary schools ===
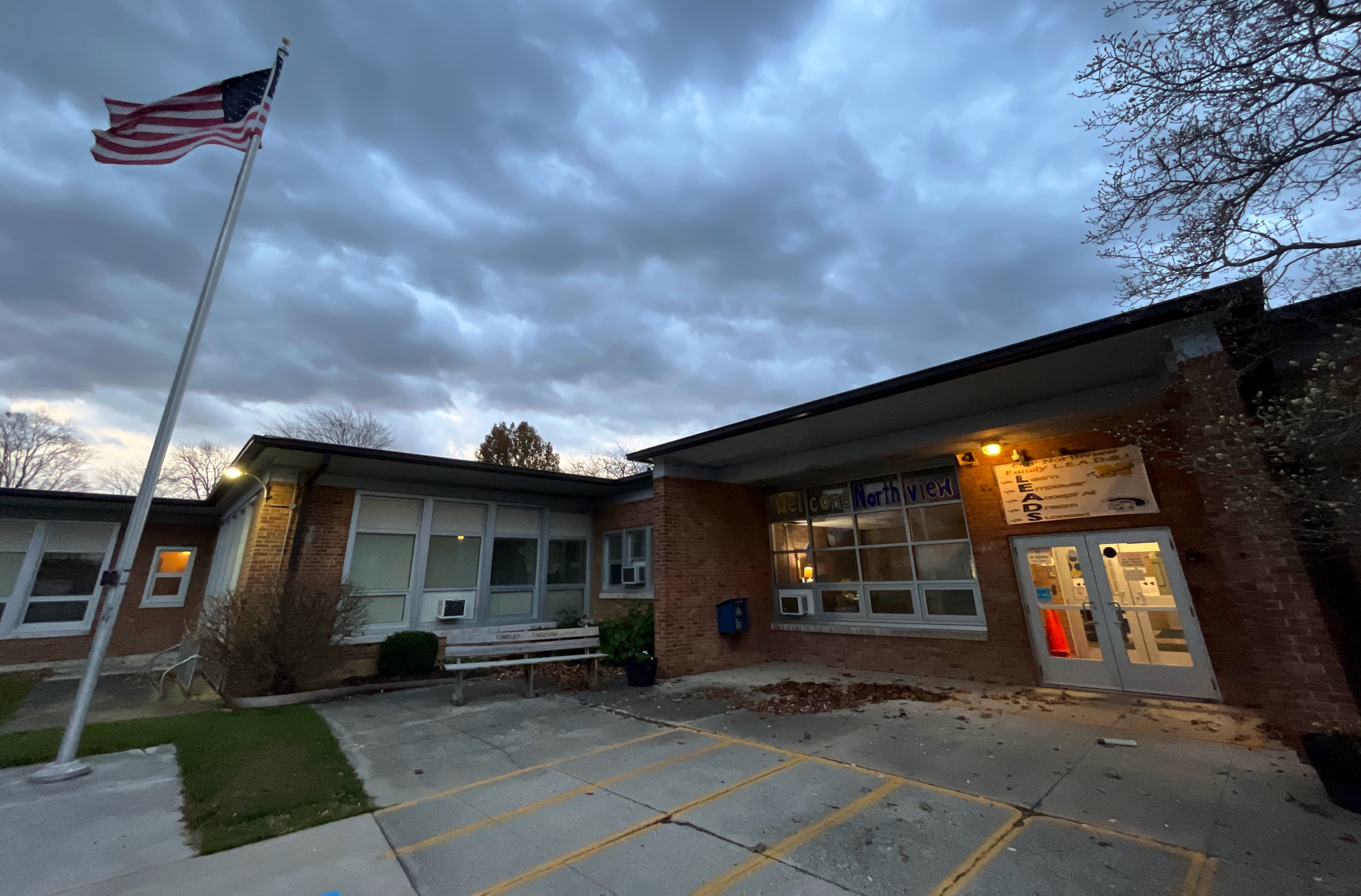
Northview Primary School

- Bigelow Elementary School
- Chamberlin Hill Elementary School
- Jacobs Elementary School
- Jefferson Elementary School
- Northview Elementary School
- Washington Elementary School
- Whittier Elementary School
- Wilson Vance Elementary School

=== Middle schools ===
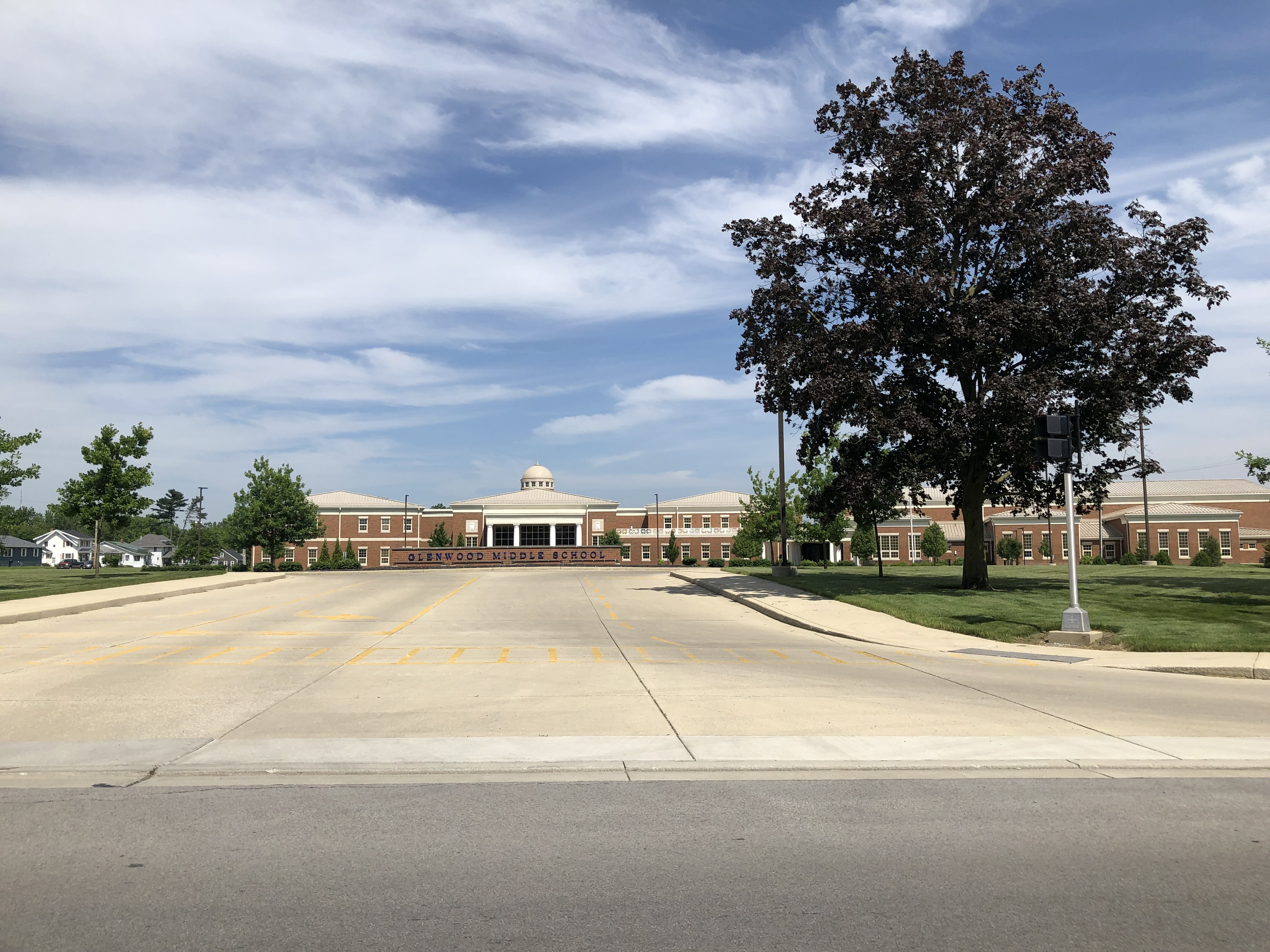
Glenwood Middle School

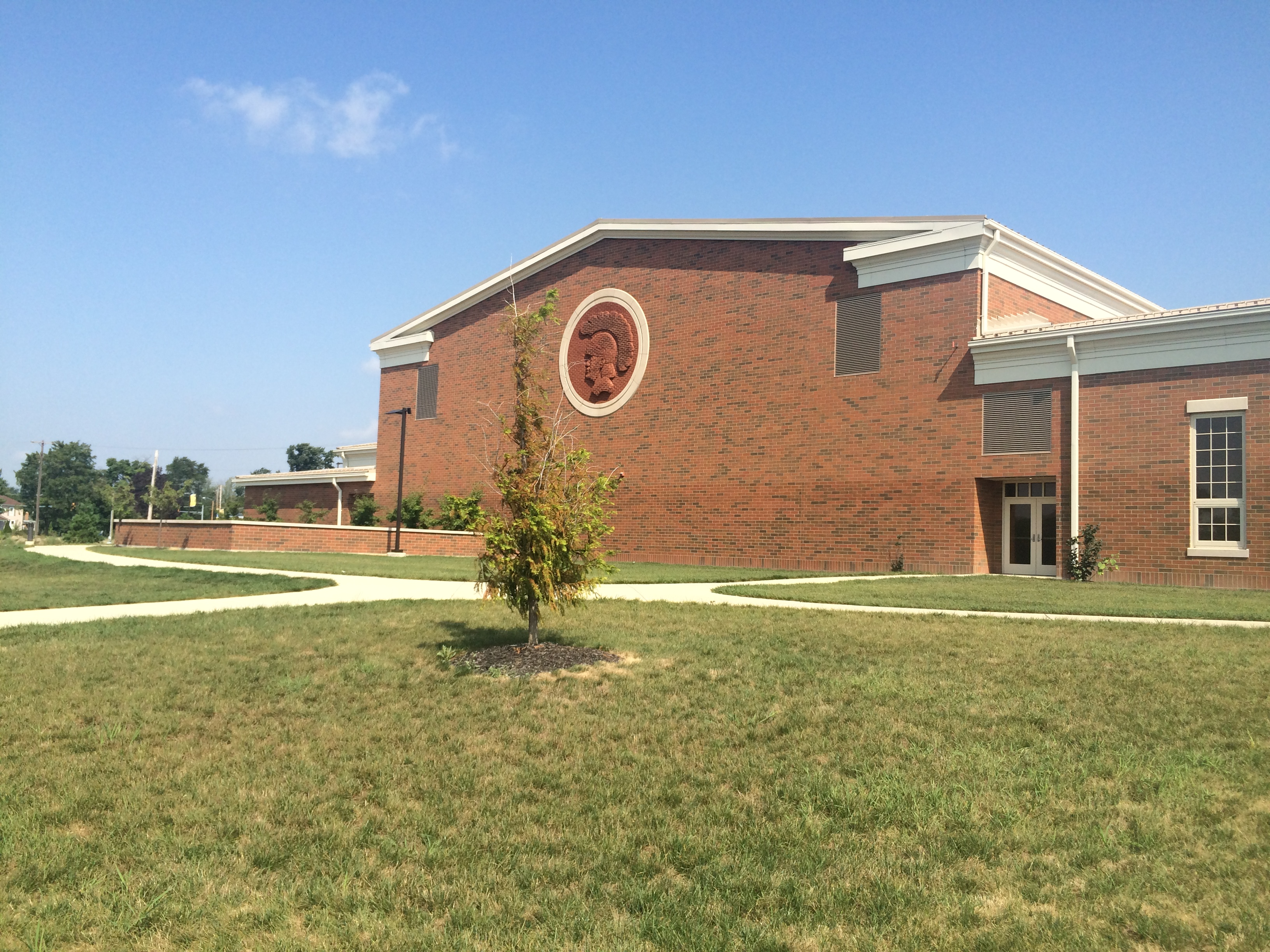
Glenwood Gym Exterior

- Donnell Middle School
- Glenwood Middle School
- Chamberlin Hill Intermediate

=== High schools ===
- Findlay High School

== Fee Schedule ==
Findlay City School District charges annual fees to students, the fee schedule is as below as of 2014:

- Preschool: $20.00
- Kindergarten: $43.00
- First Grade: $43.00
- Second Grade: $43.00
- Third Grade: $43.00
- Fourth Grade: $43.00
- Fifth Grade: $43.00
- Sixth Grade: $60.00
- Seventh Grade: $60.00
- Eighth Grade: $60.00
