= Spirit of the Hills =

1988 book by Dan O'Brien

- First edition
- Author: Dan O'Brien (author)
- Language: English
- Genre: Western fiction
- Publisher: Fontana
- Publication date: 1988
- Publication place: United States
- Media type: Print (Paperback)
- Pages: 272 pages
- ISBN: 0006176526

Spirit of the Hills is a 1988 western mystery novel by Dan O'Brien. It won the 1988 Medicine Pipe Bearer Award from the Western Writers of America.

== Plot ==
Jimmy McVay is shot to death in Toledo, Ohio while buying marijuana and his twenty-five thousand dollars is stolen. Tom McVay, his older brother and a Vietnam veteran, finds out that the murderer is a man named P J Billion from Medicine Springs in South Dakota and sets out to recover the lost money and revenge himself. In the meantime something begins to kill the livestock around Medicine Springs. Some believe that a wolf is the culprit. Buffalo wolves used to roam the prairie but they are extinct now. As incessant livestock killings arouse fear and anger among the farmers, local authorities hire Bill Egan, a seventy-year-old retired wolf trapper. When Tom McVay arrives at Medicine Springs, he happens to pass himself off as a reporter after the wolf. Kattie Running, an attractive Sioux, returns to Medicine Springs from Minnesota to join a new breed of Sioux Indians. They are mostly peaceful political activists who intend to reclaim the Black Hills that once belonged to their ancestors. But a few extremists have evil plans to blow up Mount Rushmore.
