= Mauren Brodbeck =

Swiss contemporary artist

Mauren Brodbeck (born 1965) is a Swiss contemporary artist.

== Early life ==
Mauren Brodbeck was born in Geneva, Switzerland. She trained in screenwriting, production and filmmaking in Canada. She was hired as an assistant director on the production of the film Drawing Flies, whose executive producers were Scott Mosier and Kevin Smith. From 2001 to 2004, she completed a degree at the Art Center College of Design in Pasadena (California), gaining a Bachelor of Fine art in Photography and Imaging. She followed postgraduate studies in new media at the Geneva School of Art and Design (HEAD) in Geneva, a program called Immédiat.

== Biography ==
Her work was shown in the 2005 exhibition reGeneration 1 : 50 photographes de demain at the musée de l’Élysée in Lausanne, Switzerland, then traveled to Germany, Italy, China, and the United States. In 2006, she founded Compactlab with designer Oliver Rubli, and conducted multisensory, scripting and coloring of collective environments, with smells and sounds—an activity that she developed until 2018. From 2009 to 2012, for the Hans Wilsdorf Foundation, Brodbeck produced a photographic report of the Hans Wilsdorf Bridge construction in Geneva. At her solo exhibition Mood Motel, in 2016, at the Andata Ritorno contemporary art laboratory in Geneva, she presented a series of self-portraits taken in Hollywood motels. A conference entitled The Missing Motel was organized at the Pavillon Sicli on April 19, 2016, with art critic Reyner Banham and Jacques Ferrier. As part of the 6th edition of the Triennale 50JPG (50 jours pour la photographie à Genève), Brodbeck participated in the group exhibition Osmoscosmos at the Geneva Photography Center, from June to August 2019.

== Exhibitions ==
- reGeneration 1 : 50 photographes de demain, musée de l’Élysée, June to October 2005 and traveled to Germany, Italy, China, and the United States.
- Urbanscape, Cityscape and Chocolate Gallery Heckenhauer, Berlin, April 2007
- Sweet People, Lausanne, May 2010, Los Angeles, October 2010
- Seven Wonders, Espace R, 50 JPG, Geneva Photography Center, Genève, July 2010
- Barenaked, January 2015, Hermance (Switzerland), in Fondation Auer Ory pour la photographie Hermance de Michel Auer
- Mood Motel, Andata Ritorno Laboratory for Contemporary Art, Geneva, April 2016
- Erasure, Galerie J.J. Heckenhauer, Munich, June 2019
- Osmoscosmos, 6th edition of the Triennale 50JPG (50 jours pour la photographie), Geneva Photography Center, August 2019

== Bibliography ==
- reGeneration: 50 Photographers of Tomorrow. Aperture, 2006. ISBN 8898565070.
- PHW Le Pont Hans-Wilsdorf. 2013.
- Mauren Brodbeck. Drago, 2014. ISBN 8898565070.
- Both Sides of Sunset : Photographing Los Angeles. Metropolis, 2015. ISBN 978-1938922732.
- Livre d’A/R. 2018.
- Osmoscosmos. Exhibition catalogue, CPG and Graphic Design NASK, Joerg Bader, 2019.
