= Hans Wilsdorf =

German founder of Rolex (1881–1960)

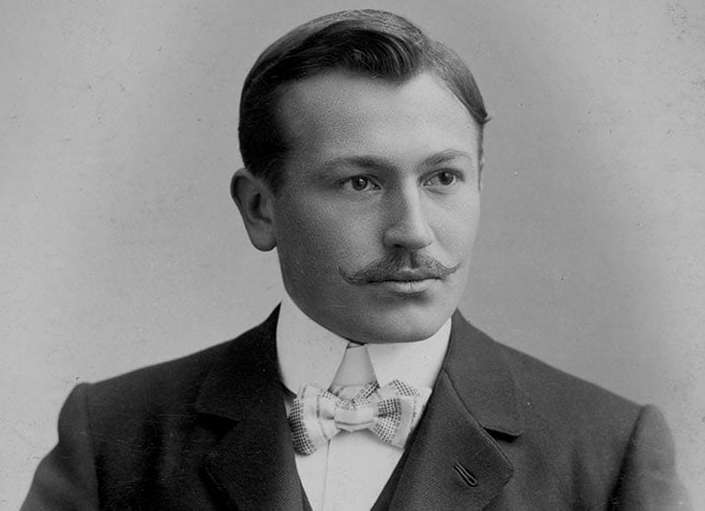
- Photo of Hans Wilsdorf (unknown date) taken from Rolex's website
- Born: 22 March 1881; Kulmbach, Kingdom of Bavaria, German Empire
- Died: 6 July 1960 (aged 79); Geneva, Switzerland
- Citizenship: German, British (after 1911)
- Known for: Founding Rolex, Tudor
- Spouses: Florence Frances May Crotty (m. 1911–1944) Betty Wilsdorf-Mettler (before 1960)

Hans Wilsdorf (22 March 1881 – 6 July 1960) was a German-British watchmaker, best known as the founder of Rolex and Tudor. Wilsdorf's philosophy for the companies was "only great marketing is needed to make a company successful".

== Early life ==
Hans Wilsdorf was born in Kulmbach, Bavaria, to Protestant parents, Anna and Johan Daniel Ferdinand Wilsdorf. He was the second of three children.

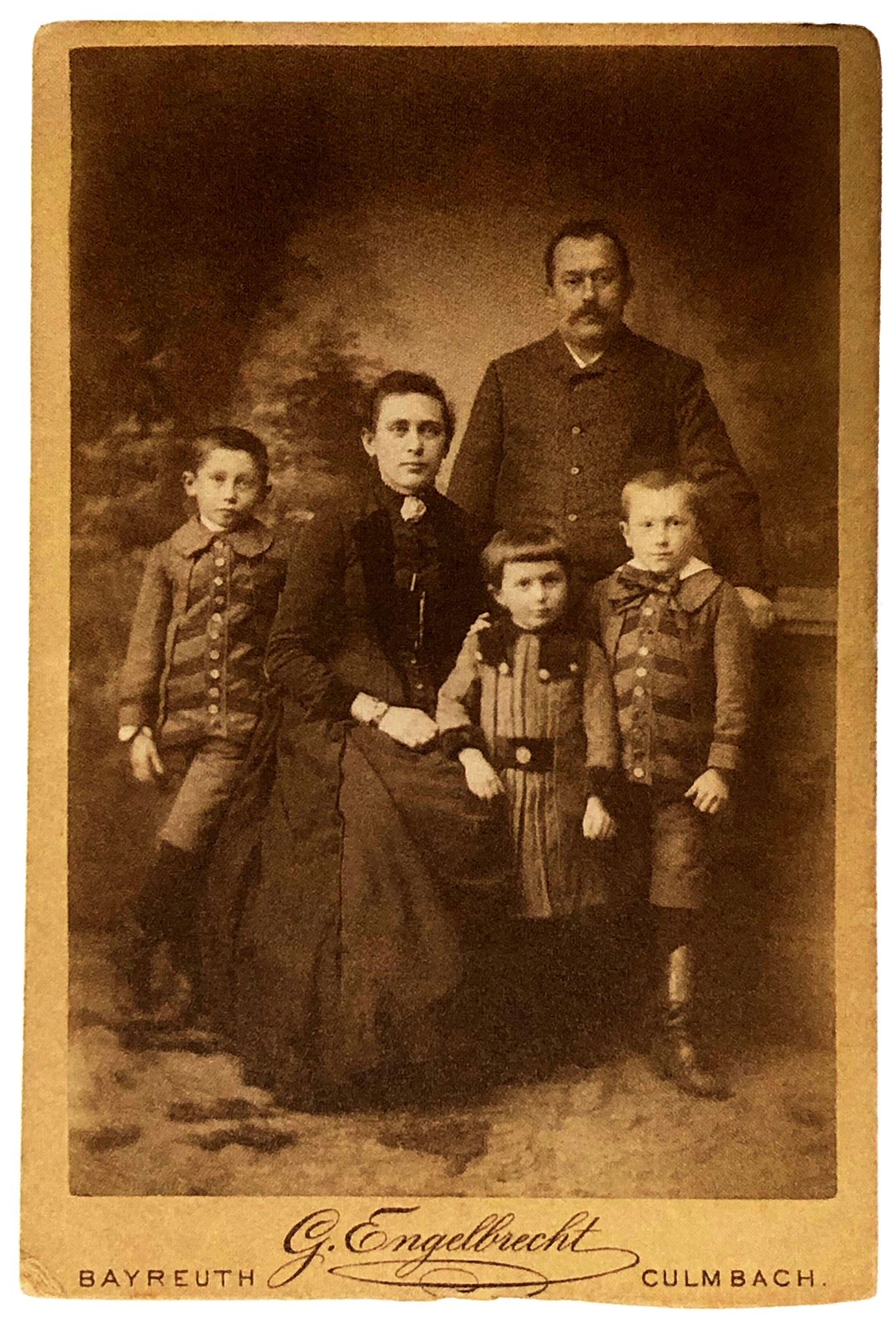
The photo above shows Hans Wilsdorf (front row right) standing in front of his father, with his mother sitting down between his sister and brother.

His mother died when he was a boy and he became an orphan when his father died soon after when Hans was twelve years old.

Wilsdorf's fate was placed in the hands of his uncles who sold the prosperous family iron tools business which had belonged to his grandfather, and later to his father. Hans and his brother and sister, for education, were sent to boarding schools.

Wilsdorf published his autobiography in 1946 as part of a four-volume set of books named Rolex Jubilee Vade Mecum. In his autobiography Hans said "Our uncles were not indifferent to our fate; nevertheless, the way in which they made me become self-reliant very early in life made me acquire the habit of looking after my possessions and, looking back, I believe that it is to this that much of my success is due."

Wilsdorf had an interest in mathematics and languages, which inspired him to travel and work in foreign countries. Hans began his career as an apprentice with an international pearl-exporting company. The experience Hans gained during this apprenticeship was applied to his future dealings.

In 1900 Wilsdorf began his career in Swiss watchmaking when he moved to La Chaux-de-Fonds to work as an English correspondent and clerk with the watch firm of Messrs. Cuno Korten, at 49, rue Leopold Robert, where he was paid a salary of 80 Swiss Francs. Cuno Korten worked with all grades of watches, and manufactured a small number of watches from the ground up.

Wilsdorf was responsible for winding hundreds of pocket watches daily in his role with Cuno Korten, as well as verifying that all watches were accurate. Wilsdorf learned a majority of his fundamental watchmaking skills during his time with Cuno Korten.

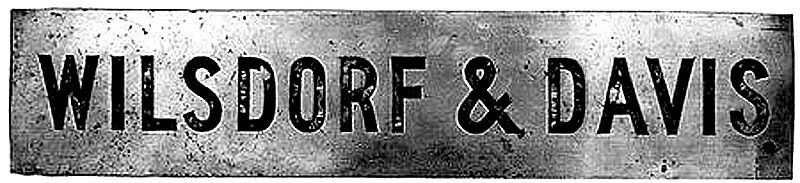
Wilsdorf-and-Davis Placard from 1905

== World War I ==
In 1914, a decade after Wilsdorf moved to London, World War I broke out, at which time Wilsdorf changed the name of Wilsdorf & Davis to The Rolex Watch Company Ltd. Fourteen days before World War I began, On July 14, 1914, Rolex was the first wristwatch in history to be awarded a Class "A" certificate from the Kew Observatory. Rolex had grown quickly; in 1914 they had more than 40 employees.

In 1914, Wilsdorf wrote: "My personal opinion ... is that pocket watches will almost completely disappear and that wrist watches will replace them definitively! I am not mistaken in this opinion and you will see that I am right".

In 1915 the British government implemented a 33% customs duty that prompted Rolex to move its international headquarters from London to Bienne, Switzerland. In 1919 Rolex moved its headquarters to Geneva, Switzerland, where it remains to this day.

== World War II ==
In mid 1941, the British authorities investigated Wilsdorf, whose brother was allegedly active in the German Ministry of Propaganda. They contacted the Swiss authorities. An investigation by the security police of the canton of Geneva concluded:

The information gathered shows that Wilsdorf is a fervent admirer of the Hitler regime. He does not hide his satisfaction when events favourable to Germany occur. However, we have not seen or heard of any pro-Hitler propaganda or suspicious activity on his part. The above-mentioned person is not unfavourably known to our judicial services and has not been convicted in our town. From a political point of view, Wilsdorf is known to our services as a 'Nazi'. A check of his correspondence was carried out in 1940, but nothing suspicious was found at the time.

By the start of World War II, Royal Air Force pilots were buying Rolex watches to replace their inferior standard-issue watches. When captured and sent to POW camps, their watches were confiscated. When Wilsdorf heard of this, he offered to replace all watches that had been confiscated and not require payment until the end of the war, if the officers would write to Rolex and explain the circumstances of their loss and where they were being held. Wilsdorf personally oversaw this effort.

In 2022, Christie's sold a Rolex Oyster Chronograph that had belonged to Gerald Imeson for $189,000. He had been a POW in Stalag Luft III and had taken Rolex up on the offer to order a replacement for the watch confiscated by the Germans. Christie's stated it believed Imeson used the watch during the 24 March 1944 escape that inspired the movie The Great Escape.

== 1960: Death and legacy ==
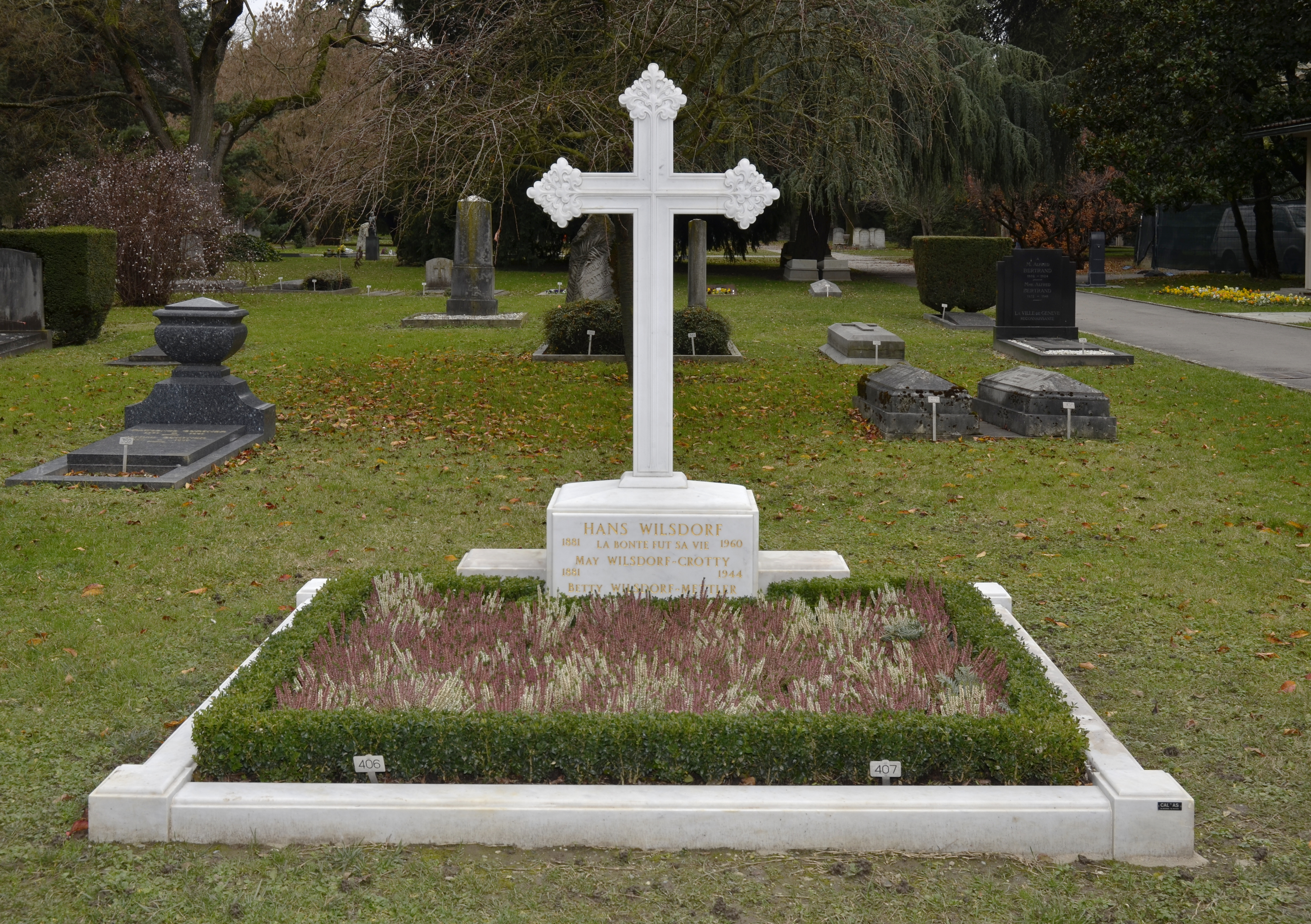
Tomb of Hans Wilsdorf. Kings Cemetery, Geneva.

Wilsdorf died in Geneva, Switzerland, on July 6, 1960. He was buried in Kings Cemetery in Geneva beside his first and second wives. The Hans Wilsdorf Foundation, established in 1945, still owns and controls Rolex.
