= Tudor Pelagos =

Line of diving watches by Tudor

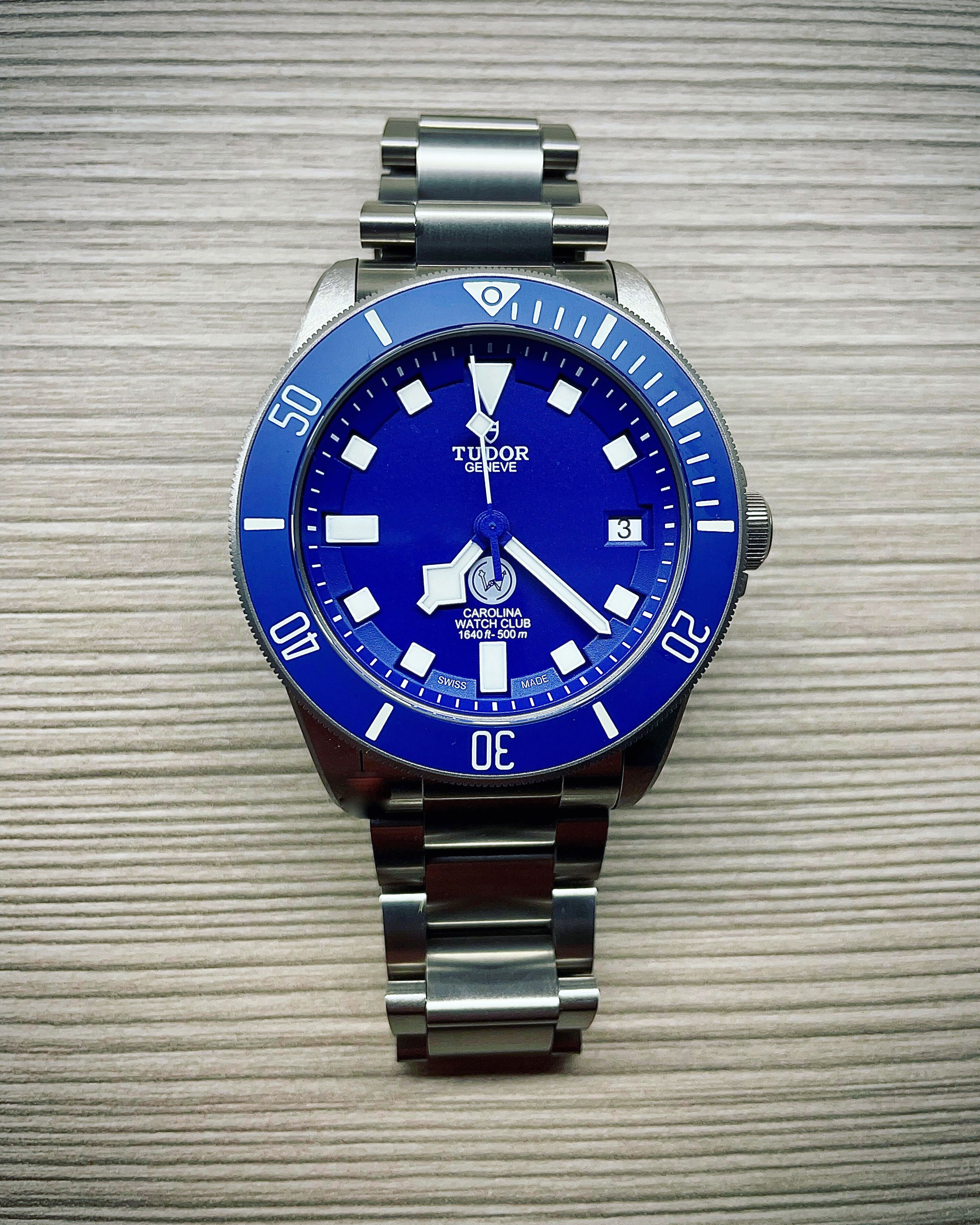
- The Tudor Pelagos Ref. M25600TB-0001 limited edition watch created for the Carolina Watch Club
- Manufacturer: Tudor
- Type: Automatic
- Display: Analogue
- Introduced: 2012

The Tudor Pelagos is a line of sports watches designed for diving and manufactured by Tudor.

== History ==
In 1946, Tudor was established as a sister brand to Rolex, to offer a more affordable watch at a similar quality, pairing off-the-shelf movements with Rolex bracelets and cases. In 1954, months after Rolex released its Submariner dive watch, Tudor followed with the nearly-identical Tudor Submariner.

In 1956, Tudor developed a watch for the French Navy, working with the Groupe d’Étude et de Recherches Sous-Marines (GERS) and became an official supplier to the military in 1961. In 1968, the Marine Nationale reported an issue where the lume would fall out of the Mercedes-style hands on their unit-issued watches. In response, Tudor introduced the ref. 7016 which featured block-facade "snowflake" hands which allowed lume to painted on more substantially, resulting in greater lume visibility.

The Tudor Submariner was produced until 1999, whilst the Rolex Submariner continued production.

In 2012, Tudor created a brand new line of dive watches inspired by its predecessors, called the 'Pelagos' with the name originating from the Greek word πέλαγος (pélagos), meaning 'high seas'.

Much like the Tudor Submariner, the Pelagos featured snowflake hands. However, unlike its predecessor, it featured an all-titanium case and bracelet, and depth rating up to 500m.

== Models ==
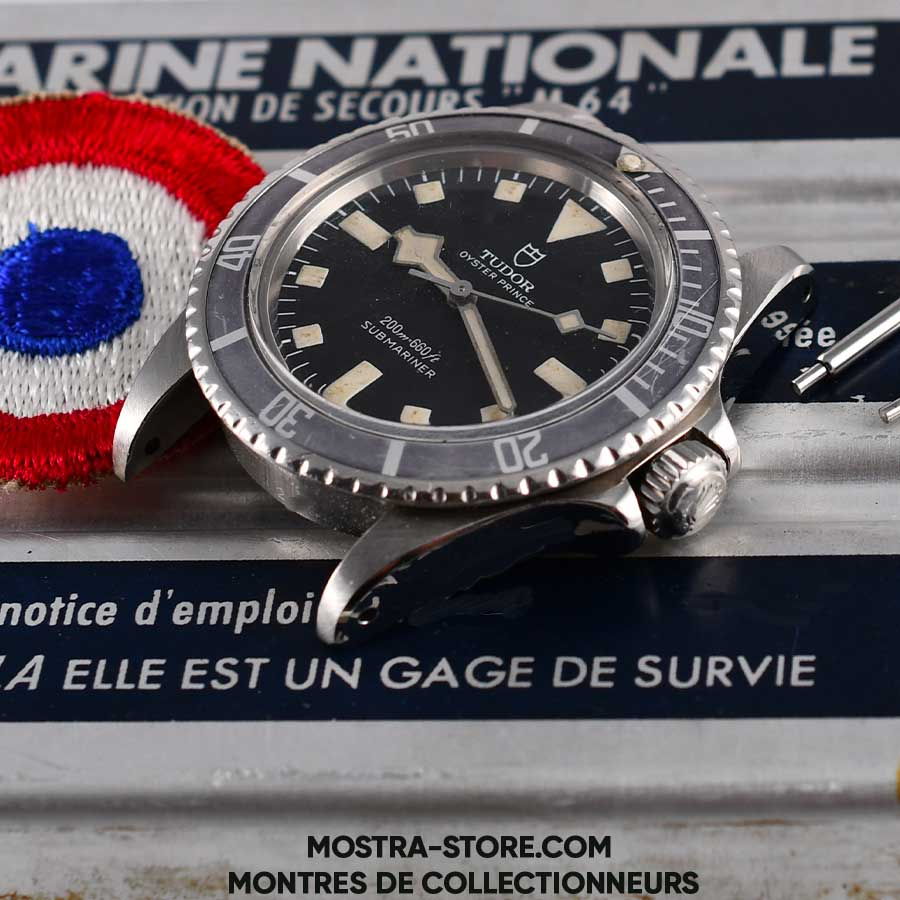
A French Marine Nationale issued Tudor Submariner (ref. 9401) showcasing the brand's "snowflake" handset (1979)

=== LHD ===
Tudor began to offer a left-handed version of the Pelagos in 2016.

=== FXD ===
In 2021, Tudor created a sub-line of Pelagos called the FXD, with an initial model developed in collaboration with the Marine Nationale (French Navy)'s Commando Hubert unit. Featuring a blue bi-directional bezel and fixed-lugs, and inscribed with 'MN' on the case back. A minor variant of the watch is issued to members of the unit. In 2023, the brand introduced another variant with a black dial and unidirectional bezel, inspired by the US Navy. A further variant was introduced in collaboration with Alinghi Red Bull Racing in both a standard-diving and chronograph set up. A GMT-variant developed in collaboration with the aeronautical division of the Marine Nationale was introduced in 2024.

=== 39 ===
A 39mm variant of the Pelagos was introduced in 2022, without a date function.

=== Ultra ===
In 2025, Tudor introduced the Pelagos Ultra with 1,000 meters of water resistance.

== Special editions ==
Tudor has produced several special editions of the Tudor Pelagos, for organisations and military units notably a LHD 'Hawkeye' for the Secret Service Counter Assault Team, and others including the Royal Engineers Commandos, and Google.
