= Findlay High School =

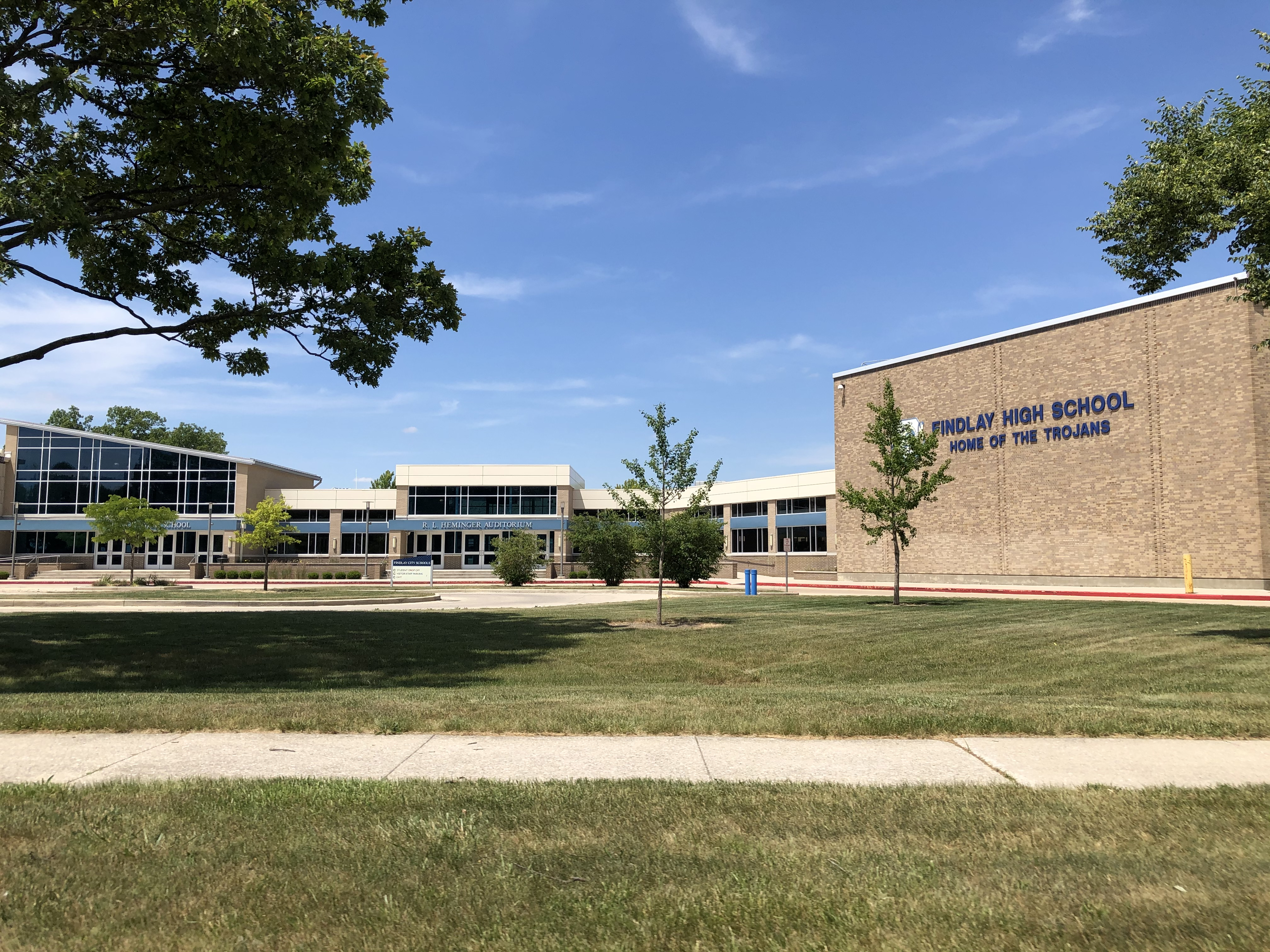
- The entrance to Findlay High School

Location
- 1200 Broad Ave. Findlay, Hancock, Ohio 45840; United States

Information
- Type: Public high school
- School district: Findlay City Schools
- NCES District ID: 3910000
- Local authority: Findlay Board of Education; City of Findlay, Ohio
- Superintendent: Andy Hatton
- NCES School ID: 391000000944
- Principal: Meg Simon
- Teaching staff: 90.40 (on an FTE basis)
- Grades: 9-12
- Enrollment: 2,050 (2023–2024)
  - Grade 9: 407
  - Grade 10: 452
  - Grade 11: 648
  - Grade 12: 543
- Student to teacher ratio: 22.68
- Colors: Blue and Gold
- Athletics conference: Northern Lakes League
- Mascot: Tommy the Trojan
- Team name: Trojans
- Accreditation: North Central Association of Colleges and Schools
- Newspaper: Blue & Gold
- Website: fhs.fcs.org

Findlay High School is a public high school in Findlay, Ohio. It is the only high school in the Findlay City School District, and the second largest high school in northwest Ohio. Their nickname is the Trojans. They are members of the Northern Lakes League. They have a top-ranked performing arts program.

== Demographics ==
For the 2022–2023 academic year, Findlay High School enrolled 1,915 students, according to the National Center for Education Statistics. The school employed 93.40 full-time equivalent educators, resulting in a student to teacher ratio of 20.5:1.

Enrollment by race and ethnicity (2022–2023)
Race and ethnicity^{†}	Enrolled pupils	Percentage
African American	54	2.82%
Asian	53	2.77%
Hispanic	207	10.81%
Native American	2	0.1%
White	1,491	77.86%
Native Hawaiian, Pacific islander	2	0.1%
Multi-race	106	5.54%
Total	1,915	100%
^{†} "Hispanic" includes Hispanics of any race. All other categories refer to non-Hispanics.

Enrollment by gender (2022–2023)
Gender	Enrolled pupils	Percentage
Female	897	46.84%
Male	1,018	53.16%
Non-binary	0	0%
Total	1,915	100%

Enrollment by grade (2022–2023)
Grade	Enrolled pupils	Percentage
9	430	22.45%
10	395	20.63%
11	595	31.07%
12	495	25.85%
Ungraded	0	0%
Total	1,915	100%

== Student groups ==
- Findlay First Edition Show Choir, (also known as FFE) is Findlay High School's varsity competitive show choir. Nationally ranked show choir program, frequently ranked #1 in Ohio.
- Voices In Perfection, the junior varsity show choir, also known as VIP. Every year VIP has competed at the Heritage fest, they have received a Gold rating.
- Blue & Gold, the student newspaper. In the 2013-2014 school year, the paper received the National Student Press Association's Pacemaker award in the "Newspapers 8 pages or fewer" category.
- Pantasia, the steel drum band. They have been on many cruises to perform.
- Latin Club, functions as a local chapter of both the Ohio Junior Classical League (OJCL) and National Junior Classical League (NJCL).
- Junior Statesmen of America, functions as a local chapter of the Ohio River Valley Junior Statesmen of America group. Students raise funds for the Tanga-Tanzania Rotary Club and have debates about public policy.
- Sketch Comedy Club, a group dedicated to writing and presenting comedy sketches.
- Books 'N' Brownies, a book club.

== Ohio High School Athletic Association State Championships ==
- Boys Baseball – 1971
- Boys Basketball – 1948
- Boys Cross Country – 1974
- Boys Golf – 1984
- Boys Ice hockey – 1978, 1983
- Boys Swimming and Diving – 1944

Note: The Boys' ice hockey team (1971, 1976) and football team (1926) each won state championships in their respective sport before they were sanctioned OHSAA sports.

== Notable alumni ==
- Gavin Creel, singer/songwriter and Tony Award winning Broadway performer
- David Cryer, actor, singer
- Peter FitzSimons, Australian Rugby player and author
- Josh Huston, NFL football player
- John Kidd, NFL football kicker
- Luke Montgomery, college football guard for the Ohio State Buckeyes
- Lamont Paris, College Basketball Coach (Chattanooga, South Carolina)
- John Poff, MLB player
- Tot Pressnell, MLB player
- James Purdy, writer, poet and playwright
- Ben Roethlisberger, NFL Quarterback
- Robert Sprague, politician
