= Philip Sugden (artist) =

English painter

Philip Sugden (born April 1949) is a British-born American visual artist, documentary filmmaker, and academic. He studied art in Paris under French painter, Arnaud D'Hauterives (winner Grand Prix de Rome). He made twelve journeys throughout the Himalaya and Tibet, including the Kingdom of Mustang and Ladakh. In May 2007, he and writer, Carole Elchert were married by Lama Nawang Tenzin at Tengboche Monastery near Mt. Everest.

== Early life and education ==
Sugden was born in Swanage, England, in April 1949. He earned a Bachelor of Fine Arts from the New York School of Visual Arts in 1977, where he studied under artists Hannah Wilke and Will Insley. He later completed a French Certificate de Completion at the Paris American Academie des Beaux-Arts et des Langues in Paris, France, in 1981, studying painting under Arnaud d'Hauterives.

== Work in Tibet and the Himalayas ==
In 1990, Sugden and his wife were awarded grants from the Ohio Joint Projects in the Arts and Humanities and the National Endowment for the Humanities, to create a Public Television presentation and companion book based on their 1988 Cultural Arts Expedition to the Himalaya and Tibet. They were guests of the Dalai Lama and the Tibetan Government in Exile, and spent six months in Tibetan communities throughout India, Nepal, Ladakh and Tibet gathering images and recordings for the production entitled, White Lotus, An Introduction to Tibetan Culture, (companion book published by Snow Lion 1991).

In 1991, Sugden co-organized the Dalai Lama's two-day visit to his home and studio in Findlay, Ohio. While there the Dalai Lama spoke at The University of Findlay, where Sugden was a part-time art faculty at the time. According to The Findlay Courier articles written at the time, the Dalai Lama visited Sugden's studio where he accepted one Sugden's drawings.

== Curatorial and exhibition career ==
During 1991, Sugden was a guest curator at the Nicholas Roerich Museum in New York City, where he organized a six-month series of exhibitions, which included a solo show of works by Robert Rauschenberg, celebrating the 1991 International Year of Tibet. In the summer of 1998 Sugden was invited by, "Artists for Tibet," to mount a solo exhibition at the Denis Bibro Gallery in New York City as part of “Art Against Chinese Human Right Abuses.”

During his thirty-five-year career, Sugden's work has been exhibited in over one-hundred solo shows internationally including New York City, Los Angeles, London, Paris, Washington D.C., Melbourne, and Kathmandu. Sugden became the first visual artist to be placed on the Marathon Performing Arts Center's "Wall of Fame" in 2019. He has also exhibited at the Toledo Museum of Art, where he received a First-Place Award in the 72nd Annual Juried Show.

He is the co-producer and director of the documentary, "Activismo: Art & Dissidence in Cuba," that focuses on five Cuban artists, including Tania Bruguera, who have been labeled as dissidents by the Cuban government.

Sugden has served as Gallery Director of the Grace Albrecht Gallery at Bluffton University since 2015. He is currently an Assistant Professor of Fine Arts at Bluffton University. He previously taught part-time at the University of Findlay.

== Awards and recognition ==
Sugden received the 2025 CreativeOhio Artist Champion Award, which recognizes leading advocates for arts and culture in Ohio. He has received the Social Activism Award at ArtPrize 2015. He became the first visual artist to be placed on the Marathon Performing Arts Center's "Wall of Fame" in 2019.

He has received grants including an Ohio Arts & Humanities Joint Projects in the Arts grant for the White Lotus PBS presentation (1991), a National Endowment for the Humanities grant for the same project, and a Faculty Development Grant from the University of Findlay to study the art of Adolf Wölfli at the American Museum of Folk Art in New York City.

== Publications ==
Sugden has written on Tibetan culture and art, including the article "Tibetan Sky Burial – An Ancient Ritual" (1992–1993). He co-authored, with Carole Elchert, Visions from the Fields of Merit: Drawings of Tibet & the Himalayas (2000) and co-organized the companion volume White Lotus: An Introduction to Tibetan Culture (1991). His artwork has also appeared on the covers of several books, including Entering the Word Temple by Diane Frank and Path to Bliss by the Dalai Lama.
