= May Brodbeck =

American philosopher of science

- Brodbeck in 1974
- Born: May Selznick Schachter; July 26, 1917. Newark, New Jersey
- Died: August 2, 1983; Menlo Park, California
- Occupation: Professor

Academic background
- Education: New York University, University of Iowa
- Doctoral advisor: Gustav Bergmann

Academic work
- Discipline: Philosopher
- Sub-discipline: Philosophy of science
- Institutions: University of Minnesota; University of Iowa

May Selznick Brodbeck (July 26, 1917 – August 1, 1983) was an American philosopher of science.

== Biography ==
May Selznick Brodbeck was born in Newark, New Jersey to Louis and Etta Schachter in 1917. She married Arthur Brodbeck in the early 1940s, the two divorced in 1949.

She studied chemistry at New York University, attending evening courses while working, and earned a bachelor's degree in 1941. Thereafter, she worked as a high-school chemistry teacher, before being recruited into the Manhattan Project. Following the war, she studied philosophy at the University of Iowa, completing a Ph.D. supervised by Gustav Bergmann in 1947, on the subject of John Dewey's Logic: The Theory of Inquiry.

Upon finishing her PhD, she was offered a professorship at the University of Minnesota, where she worked from 1947 to 1974, eventually rising to chair of the philosophy department (1967–1970) and dean of the graduate school (1972–1974). She then returned to the University of Iowa as Carver Professor of Philosophy and Dean of the Faculties. In the administrative part of her role at the University of Iowa, among other initiatives she focused in particular on the status of women in the university, and oversaw the creation of one of the first women's studies programs. She stepped down from administration in 1981, retired in 1983, and died later that year in Menlo Park, California.

== Work ==
Brodbeck's career focused on a number of issues in the philosophy of science, in particular aiming to include the social sciences within its remit. She edited two widely read anthologies on the subject: Readings in the Philosophy of Science (1953, co-edited with Herbert Feigl), and Readings in the Philosophy of the Social Sciences (1968). Later in her career, she also wrote on the philosophy of mind, defending a form of psychophysical parallelism.

== Select bibliography ==
- Readings in the Philosophy of Science (1953, co-edited with Herbert Feigl) At Internet Archive.
- List of works by May Brodbeck listed at PhilPapers.
