= Joshua Brodbeck =

American musician

Joshua Brodbeck is an American concert organist. He has studied with concert organist Todd Wilson from the Cleveland Institute of Music.

== Biography ==
Joshua Brodbeck began his concert career in Slovenia, Europe at the age of twelve. Since then, he has given many concerts throughout the United States. Mr. Brodbeck has studied with Steve Jacoby and international concert organist Todd Wilson. In 2007, Mr. Brodbeck won the Indianapolis American Guild of Organists Young Artist competition. Also in 2007, he was the recipient of Keller award for outstanding performance at Capital University. In 2008, Mr. Brodbeck won the Perrini award for performance. In 2009, he won the Evansville American Guild of Organist Young Artists Competition and received second place in the Region V American Guild of Organist Young Artist Competition in Detroit. His performances have been featured on television and public radio. Mr. Brodbeck holds the Colleague certificate from the American Guild of Organists. (The American Organist, October 2009) He serves as Director of Music at Holy Trinity Lutheran Church, Upper Arlington, Ohio, where he is nicknamed "Herr Kapelle Meister." Mr. Brodbeck is also the Organist-in-Residence at the Methodist Theological School of Ohio.
