= Hans Wilsdorf Foundation =

Swiss private foundation in Geneva, owner of Rolex

- Formation: 1945
- Founded: August 1, 1945; 80 years ago
- Founder: Hans Wilsdorf
- Type: Foundation
- Headquarters: Carouge, Geneva
- Location: Canton of Geneva
- President: Costin van Berchem (since 2013)
- Key people: Marc Maugué (Secretary General)
- Employees: Approximately twenty
- Website: hanswilsdorf.ch

The Hans Wilsdorf Foundation is a private Swiss foundation established in Carouge (in the Canton of Geneva). It is the sole owner of the watchmaking group Rolex.

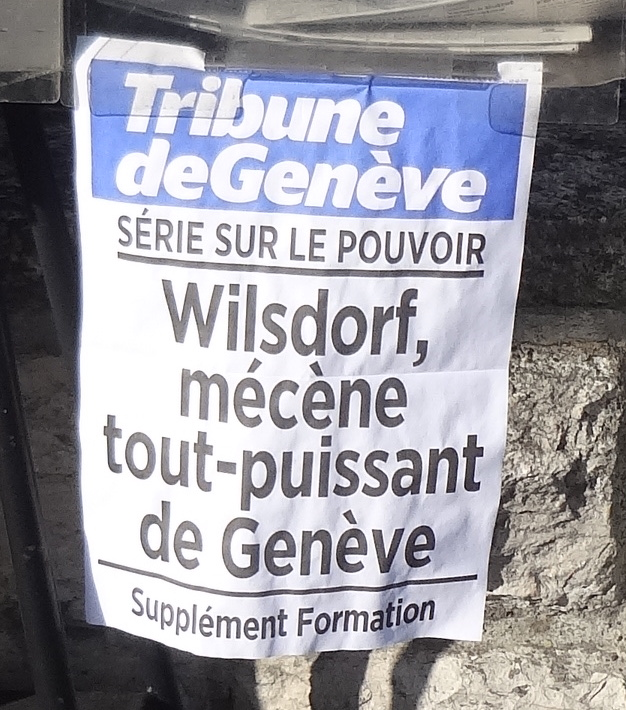
Front page of the Tribune de Genève on 2 February 2018.

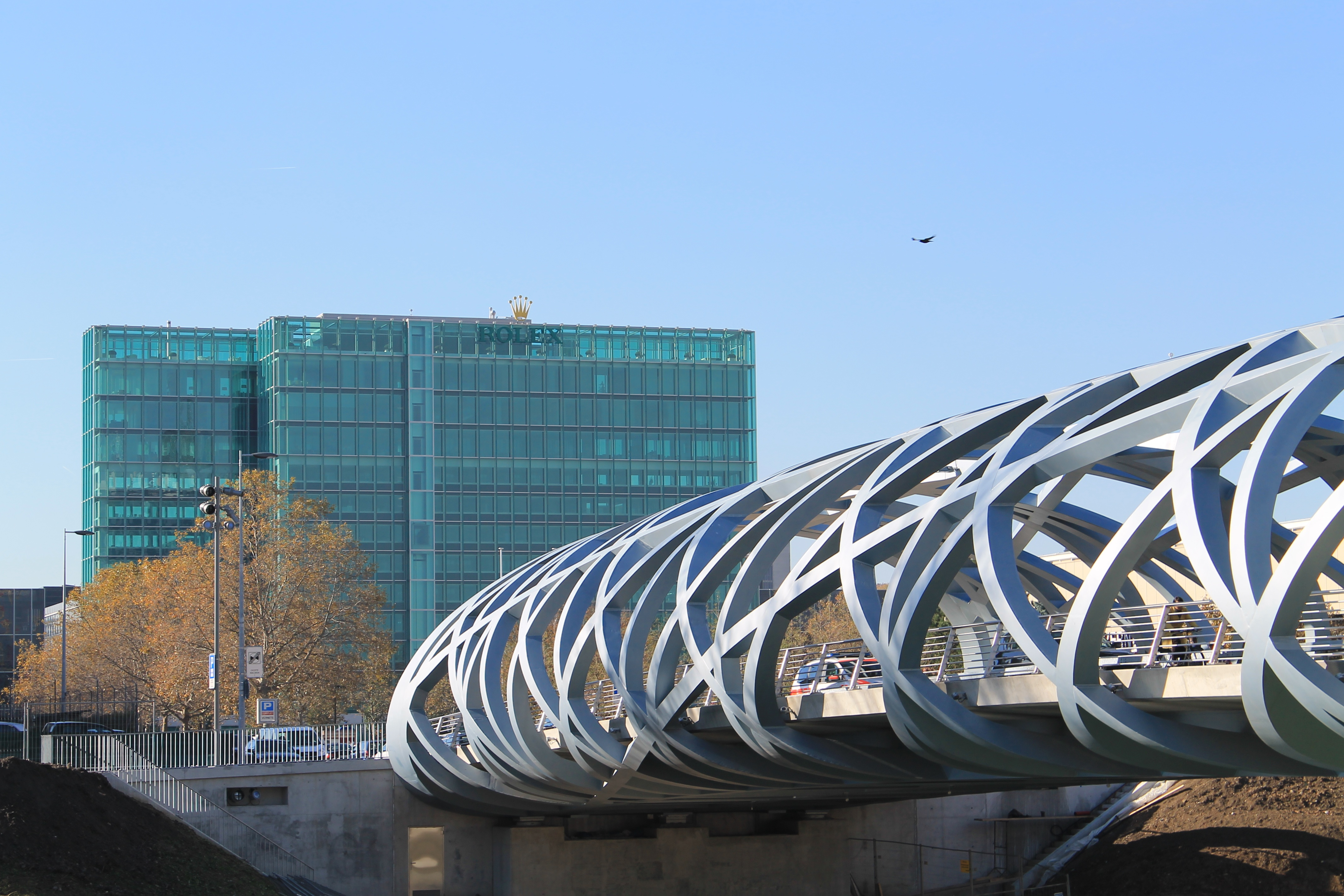
The Hans Wilsdorf Bridge aligned with the main Rolex building in Geneva.

== Methods ==
The foundation supports social institutions and provides financial assistance to individuals in need through social services. It awards scholarships and funds measures to facilitate access to or return to employment. It subsidizes institutions in the fields of music, theater, and visual arts. It also supports animal protection projects worldwide.

== History ==
The foundation was established on 1 August 1945 by Hans Wilsdorf (president and founder of Rolex), following the death of his wife in 1944. As confirmed by his will in 1960, he bequeathed all his shares to the foundation to ensure that the company Montres Rolex SA would outlive him. The foundation's current legal form dates from 1921.

Since at least 2006, an "Excellence Award" has been presented to graduates of the Haute École d'art et de design (HEAD). Valued at 50,000 each, the awards initially covered three disciplines, expanding to four in 2012 and five in 2015: Jewelry Design, Watch and Accessories, Fashion Design, Cinema, Visual Communication and Media Design, and Spatial Design and Interior Architecture.

The foundation reportedly adheres to a code of conduct: it does not disclose its wealth, donation amounts, or beneficiaries. In the course of the investigation, one journalist interviewed individuals who all requested anonymity. Some claimed that the foundation's donations amount to "at least 100 million francs per year, possibly up to 150 million". The foundation invests in major real estate projects, awards scholarships, supports social associations, funds foundations focused on debt relief or workplace integration, and backs culture and sports (e.g., Servette FC). Its influence can determine the success of state projects, such as a new building for the State Archives of Geneva (half-funded, 25) and new premises for the Haute École d'art et de design (HEAD) (purchase of three buildings for 100). Conversely, a Council of State of Geneva project in 2010 at La Jonction (Blue Brain project) did not materialize. A lean structure of about ten people reportedly handles nearly 4,000 annually with minimal formalities. The Hans Wilsdorf Bridge over the Arve, completed in 2012, was fully funded by the foundation. In March 2018, the foundation committed to funding a new building for the State Archives of Geneva through an association, "L'avenir du passé." It provided half of the fifty million francs needed to transform the Plainpalais arsenal and construct a two-level underground storage facility. The president of the State Council, François Longchamp, stated that "without this support, we would likely have had to settle for a simple, industrial-style functional building".

In August 2019, to the public's surprise, the foundation purchased a set of buildings in the city center, the "Mont-Blanc Centre," an architectural complex built in 1952 by Marc-Joseph Saugey. This included protected buildings at 1-3 Rue du Cendrier and 19-21 Rue de Chantepoulet, and a cinema, the Cinéma Plaza (1,250). Closed since 2004, the cinema had been authorized for demolition to make way for an underground parking lot, student housing, and shops. Instead, the foundation will renovate and upgrade the venue.

In May 2025, the foundation partnered with the Canton of Geneva to create a new foundation to support both international and non-governmental organizations based in Geneva, enabling them to address "challenges posed by declining funding" (in the context of reduced support from the United States, particularly via USAID). Each entity initially contributed 25 million francs.
