= List of bridges in Switzerland =

This is a list of bridges and viaducts in Switzerland, including those for pedestrians and vehicular traffic.

== Historical and architectural interest bridges ==
	Name	Distinction	Length	Type	Carries Crosses	Opened	Location	Canton	Ref.
1	Kapellbrücke	Oldest wooden covered bridge in Europe; Cultural properties of national significance (A)	204 m (669 ft)	Covered bridge Wood	Footbridge; Reuss	1333	Lucerne; 47°03′05.5″N 8°18′26.7″E	Lucerne	
2	Spreuer Bridge	Cultural properties of national significance (A)	81 m (266 ft)	Covered bridge Wood	Footbridge; Reuss	1408	Lucerne; 47°03′06.9″N 8°18′06.2″E	Lucerne	
3	Untertorbrücke		52 m (171 ft)	Masonry; 3 arches	Road bridge Aare	1489	Bern; 46°56′57.8″N 7°27′30.4″E	Bern	
4	Neubrügg	Cultural properties of national significance (A)	92 m (302 ft)	Covered bridge Wood	Road bridge Aare	1535	Bern–Bremgarten bei Bern; 46°58′25.6″N 7°25′41.3″E	Bern	
5	Bremgarten Bridge over the Reuss			Covered bridge Wood	Footbridge; Reuss	1549	Bremgarten; 47°21′0.9″N 8°20′25.3″E	Aargau	
6	Aarberg Wooden Bridge	Cultural properties of national significance (A)		Covered bridge Wood	Road bridge Aare	1567	Aarberg; 47°02′37.1″N 7°16′27.7″E	Bern	
7	First Schöllenen Devil's Bridge collapse in 1888	Devil's Bridge		Masonry; 1 arch	Former Gotthard Pass road Schöllenen Gorge	1595	Andermatt; 46°38′50.7″N 8°35′25.6″E	Uri	
8	Bern Bridge	Cultural properties of national significance (A)	40 m (130 ft)	Covered bridge Wood	Road bridge Saane/Sarine	1653	Fribourg; 46°48′15.4″N 7°10′08.3″E	Fribourg	
9	Ponte dei Salti	Cultural properties of national significance (B)		Masonry; 2 arches	Footbridge; Verzasca	17th century	Lavertezzo; 46°15′11.4″N 8°50′34.2″E	Ticino	
10	Holzbrücke Bad Säckingen	Cultural properties of national significance (A)	204 m (669 ft)	Covered bridge Wood	Footbridge; Rhine	1700	Stein–Bad Säckingen; 47°33′05.1″N 7°57′05.3″E	Aargau; Germany	
11	Rothenburg Bridge	Cultural properties of national significance (A)	45 m (148 ft)	Covered bridge Wood	Footbridge; Hellbühler Rotbach	1717	Rothenburg; 47°05′35.9″N 8°16′28.1″E	Lucerne	
12	Olten Old Bridge	Cultural properties of national significance (A)		Covered bridge Wood	Footbridge; Aare	1803	Olten; 47°20′58.3″N 7°54′18.5″E	Solothurn	
13	Rheinbrücke Rheinau–Altenburg	Cultural properties of national significance (B)	80 m (260 ft)	Covered bridge Wood	Road bridge Rhine	1806	Rheinau–Jestetten; 47°38′51.5″N 8°36′10.3″E	Zürich; Germany	
14	Baden Wooden Bridge		39 m (128 ft)	Covered bridge Wood	Footbridge; Limmat	1810	Baden; 47°28′21.6″N 8°18′38.5″E	Aargau	
15	Second Schöllenen Devil's Bridge	Devil's Bridge		Masonry; 1 arch	Former Gotthard Pass road Schöllenen Gorge	1830	Andermatt; 46°38′50.6″N 8°35′25.2″E	Uri	
16	Old Hundwil Bridge demolished in 1928		90 m (300 ft)	Covered bridge Wood	Road bridge Urnäsch	1839	Hundwil; 47°21′40.7″N 9°18′06.1″E	Appenzell Ausserrhoden	
17	Rueun Bridge	Span : 43 m (141 ft)	44 m (144 ft)	Covered bridge Wood	Road bridge Vorderrhein	1840	Rueun; 46°46′26.6″N 9°08′49.4″E	Grisons	
18	Nydeggbrücke	Span : 46 m (151 ft); Cultural properties of national significance (A)	190 m (620 ft)	Masonry; 3 arches	Road bridge Aare	1844	Bern; 46°56′54.6″N 7°27′30.6″E	Bern	
19	Russein Bridge	Height : 45 m (148 ft); Span : 56 m (184 ft); Cultural properties of national significance (A)	61 m (200 ft)	Covered bridge Wood	Footbridge; Russeinerbach	1857	Sumvitg; 46°43′18.4″N 8°53′46.0″E	Grisons	
20	Goldach Viaduct	One of the oldest railway bridges in Switzerland	77 m (253 ft)	masonry	railway	1856	Goldach	St. Gallen	
21	Le Day Viaduct	Height : 59 m (194 ft); Span : 56 m (184 ft)	119 m (390 ft)	Masonry; 3 main arches	Simplon Railway; Vallorbe–Le Brassus railway line Orbe	1869	Vallorbe; 46°43′20.4″N 6°23′45.6″E	Vaud	
22	Wooden bridge, Scuol	Span : 39 m (128 ft); Cultural properties of national significance (B)	46 m (151 ft)	Covered bridge Wood	Road bridge Inn	1878	Scuol; 46°47′36.7″N 10°17′57.7″E	Grisons	
23	Kirchenfeldbrücke	Cultural properties of national significance (A)	78 m (256 ft)	Arch; Steel deck arch	Trams in Bern; Road bridge Aare	1883	Bern; 46°56′44.8″N 7°26′54.9″E	Bern	
24	Eglisau railway bridge	Cultural properties of national significance (B)	457 m (1,499 ft)	Truss bridge Iron	Eglisau–Neuhausen railway line Rhine	1897	Eglisau; 47°34′39.3″N 8°30′37.1″E	Zürich	
25	Alte Rheinbrücke Vaduz–Sevelen	Switzerland–Liechtenstein border	135 m (443 ft)	Covered bridge Wood	Footbridge; Rhine	1901	Sevelen–Vaduz; 47°07′56.9″N 9°30′41.9″E	St. Gallen; Liechtenstein	
26	Zuoz Bridge	One of the first bridge by Robert Maillart	23 m (75 ft)	Arch; Concrete deck arch	Road bridge Inn	1901	Zuoz; 46°35′49.0″N 9°57′46.0″E	Grisons	
27	Solis Viaduct	Height : 85 m (279 ft); Span : 42 m (138 ft); Albula Railway; World Heritage Site; Cultural properties of national significance (B)	164 m (538 ft)	Masonry; 1 main arch	Albula Railway; Albula	1902	Thusis–Tiefencastel; 46°40′45.1″N 9°31′48.6″E	Grisons	
28	Landwasser Viaduct	Height : 65 m (213 ft); Albula Railway; World Heritage Site; Cultural properties of national significance (A)	136 m (446 ft)	Masonry; 6 arches	Albula Railway; Landwasser	1903	Filisur; 46°40′50.9″N 9°40′34.7″E	Grisons	
29	Middle Bridge, Basel	Oldest still standing bridge location across the Rhine	192 m (630 ft)	Masonry; 6 arches	Road bridge Rhine	1905	Basel; 47°33′36.5″N 7°35′22.9″E	Basel-Stadt	
30	Gmündertobel Bridge	Span : 79 m (259 ft); Cultural properties of national significance (A)	173 m (568 ft)	Arch; Concrete deck arch	Road bridge Sitter	1908	Stein–Teufen; 47°23′16.2″N 9°20′53.4″E	Appenzell Ausserrhoden	
31	Brusio spiral viaduct	Bernina Railway; World Heritage Site; Cultural properties of national significance (B)	110 m (360 ft)	Masonry; 9 arches	Bernina Railway	1908	Brusio; 46°15′13.2″N 10°07′41.0″E	Grisons	
32	Wiesen Viaduct	Height : 88 m (289 ft); Span : 55 m (180 ft); Cultural properties of national significance (B)	210 m (690 ft)	Masonry; 1 main arch	Davos–Filisur railway Landwasser	1909	Davos Wiesen; 46°41′39.9″N 9°42′46.3″E	Grisons	
33	Bietschtal Bridge		110 m (360 ft)	Truss bridge Steel; V-shaped legs	Lötschberg railway Bietschbach	1913	Raron; 46°19′23.1″N 7°48′49.6″E	Valais	
34	Salginatobel Bridge	Longest three-hinged arch bridge when inaugurated Designed Robert Maillart; Span : 90 m (300 ft); Cultural properties of national significance (A)	132 m (433 ft)	Arch; Concrete deck arch	Road bridge Salgina Ravine	1924	Schiers; 46°58′54.3″N 9°43′05.5″E	Grisons	
35	Rossgraben Bridge	Designed Robert Maillart; Span : 82 m (269 ft); Cultural properties of national significance (A)		Arch; Concrete deck arch	Road bridge Rossgraben	1932	Schwarzenburg; 46°49′39.9″N 7°23′53.6″E	Bern	
36	Schwandbach Bridge	Designed Robert Maillart; Thickness of the arch : 20 cm (0.66 ft); Span : 37 m (121 ft); Cultural properties of national significance (A)		Arch; Concrete deck arch	Road bridge Schwandbach	1933	Schwarzenburg; 46°49′45.6″N 7°24′08.6″E	Bern	
37	Vessy Bridge	Designed Robert Maillart; Cultural properties of national significance (A)		Arch; Concrete deck arch	Road bridge Arve	1937	Geneva–Veyrier; 46°10′51.9″N 6°9′35.5″E	Geneva	
38	Third Schöllenen Devil's Bridge	Devil's Bridge; Span : 66 m (217 ft)		Masonry; 1 arch	Former Gotthard Pass road Schöllenen Gorge	1956	Andermatt; 46°38′50.7″N 8°35′27″E	Uri	

== Major road and railway bridges ==
The longest viaduct in Switzerland is the Yverdon Viaduct, built in 1984 on the A5 motorway with a total length of 3,155 metres (10,351 ft). The Letzigraben Bridge, near Zürich Hauptbahnhof, is the longest railway viaduct in the country measuring 1,156 metres (3,793 ft).

The Grimselsee Bridge is part of the "KWO plus" project which consists to raise by 23 metres (75 ft) the water level of the Grimsel Lake, to increase the power capacity of the two Spittellamm and Seeuferegg damns. The part of the road between Guttannen and Obergoms flooded by the project will be span by a 346 metres (1,135 ft) cable-stayed bridge, to restore the continuity across the lake.

In 2021 a competition was organized to choose the project for the Plessur river valley crossing near Chur in the Grisons canton, in order to relieve the road traffic of the city center. Among a total of 41 projects submitted, the winner is called "un solo arco" (only one arch), it proposes a steel arch with a 340 metres (1,120 ft) main span, more than 100 metres (330 ft) above the river. This bridge will be named the St. Luzi Bridge.

This table presents the structures with spans greater than 100 meters (non-exhaustive list).

	Name	Span	Length	Type	Carries Crosses	Opened	Location	Canton	Ref.
1	Great Suspension Bridge demolished in 1923	265 m (869 ft)	246	Suspension; Iron deck, masonry pylons	Road bridge Saane/Sarine	1834	Fribourg; 46°48′23.8″N 7°10′0.7″E	Fribourg	
2	Tamina Bridge	259 m (850 ft)	475 m (1,558 ft)	Arch; Asymmetrical concrete deck arch	Road bridge Valenserstrasse; Tamina	2017	Pfäfers; 46°59′23.5″N 9°29′21.0″E	St. Gallen	(Note: The Tamina Bridge is the highest arch bridge in Switzerland and in whole Europe with a 200 metres (660 ft) high deck above the river. In 2022, the current highest arch bridge in the world is the Chenab Rail Bridge in India crossing a valley 362 metres (1,188 ft) above the river.)
3	Poya Bridge	196 m (643 ft)	851 m (2,792 ft)	Cable-stayed; Composite steel/concrete deck, concrete pylons 54+86+196+86+54	Principal road 12; Saane/Sarine	2014	Fribourg; 46°48′46.5″N 7°09′54.5″E	Fribourg	
4	Ganter Bridge	174 m (571 ft)	678 m (2,224 ft)	Extradosed; Concrete box girder deck, concrete pylons and cable-stays 50+127+174+127+80+50	Principal road 9 European route E62; Ganter Valley	1980	Naters; 46°17′48.6″N 8°03′00.9″E	Valais	
5	Dala Gorge Bridge	174 m (571 ft)	209 m (686 ft)	Beam bridge Composite steel/concrete deck V-shaped legs	Road bridge Varenstrasse; Dala Gorge	1989	Varen–Leuk; 46°19′09.2″N 7°37′24.7″E	Valais	
6	Biaschina-Viadukt	160 m (520 ft)	645 m (2,116 ft)	Box girder Prestressed concrete Twin bridges 140+160+140	A2 motorway European route E35; Ticino	1980	Giornico; 46°25′15.1″N 8°51′27.2″E	Ticino	
7	Lorraine railway viaduct	150 m (490 ft)	1,092 m (3,583 ft)	Arch; Concrete deck arch	Olten–Bern railway line Aare	1941	Bern; 46°57′14.3″N 7°26′30.9″E	Bern	
8	Mentue Bridge	150 m (490 ft)	571 m (1,873 ft)	Box girder Prestressed concrete Twin bridges 93+135+150+120+70	A1 motorway European route E25; Mentue	1999	Yvonand; 46°46′36.3″N 6°43′31.4″E	Vaud	
9	Felsenau Viaduct	144 m (472 ft)	1,116 m (3,661 ft)	Box girder Prestressed concrete 94+144+144+94	A1 motorway European route E25; Aare	1975	Bern; 46°58′09.9″N 7°26′52.2″E	Bern	
10	Lutrive Bridge	143 m (469 ft)	395 m (1,296 ft)	Box girder Prestressed concrete Twin bridges 57+129+143+64	A9 motorway European route E62; Lutrive	1974	Lutry; 46°30′56.5″N 6°41′49.9″E	Vaud	
11	Riddes Bridge	143 m (469 ft)	253 m (830 ft)	Box girder Prestressed concrete Lateral girder Twin bridges 55+143+55	A9 motorway European route E62; Rhône	1990	Riddes–Chamoson; 46°10′42.7″N 7°13′24.0″E	Valais	
12	Hundwil Gorge Bridge	143 m (469 ft)	269 m (883 ft)	Arch; Concrete deck arch	Road bridge Hundwilerstrasse; Urnäsch	1992	Hundwil; 47°21′42.1″N 9°18′08.4″E	Appenzell Ausserrhoden	
13	Chandoline Bridge	140 m (460 ft)	284 m (932 ft)	Cable-stayed; Concrete box girder deck, concrete pylons 72+140+72	A9 motorway European route E62; Rhône	1989	Sion; 46°13′27.9″N 7°21′54.3″E	Valais	
14	Sunniberg Bridge	140 m (460 ft)	526 m (1,726 ft)	Extradosed; Prestressed concrete deck, 4 concrete pylons Curved bridge 59+128+140+134+65	Principal road 28; Landquart	1998	Klosters; 46°53′06.3″N 9°51′24.9″E	Grisons	
15	Lorzen Gorge Bridge	138 m (453 ft)	568 m (1,864 ft)	Box girder Prestressed concrete 77+3x138+77	Road bridge Aegeristrasse; Lorze	1985	Baar; 47°10′40.9″N 8°33′26.2″E	Zug	
16	Johannit Bridge	137 m (449 ft)	257 m (843 ft)	Box girder Prestressed concrete	Road bridge Rhine	1967	Basel; 47°33′53.6″N 7°35′08.5″E	Basel-Stadt	
17	Fürstenland Bridge	135 m (443 ft)	489 m (1,604 ft)	Arch; Concrete deck arch	Principal road 7 Sitter	1940	St. Gallen; 47°24′27.9″N 9°19′18.3″E	St. Gallen	
18	Landquart Arch Bridge	134 m (440 ft)	154 m (505 ft)	Arch; Steel tied arch	Road bridge Landquart	1994	Landquart; 46°58′10.6″N 9°34′31.5″E	Grisons	
19	Vaux Viaduct	130 m (430 ft)(x2)	945 m (3,100 ft)	Beam bridge Composite steel/concrete deck 130+16+130	A1 motorway European route E25; Vaux	1999	Yvonand; 46°47′02.4″N 6°44′43.5″E	Vaud	
20	A5 Highway Bridge over the Aare	130 m (430 ft)		Cable-stayed; Composite steel/concrete deck, steel pylons Twin bridges	A5 motorway Aare	1998	Grenchen–Arch; 47°10′36.4″N 7°25′54.5″E	Solothurn; Bern	
21	Veveyse Bridge	129 m (423 ft)	328 m (1,076 ft)	Box girder Steel; Twin bridges 111+129+58	A9 motorway European route E62; Veveyse	1969	Vevey–Corsier-sur-Vevey; 46°28′35.7″N 6°51′24.9″E	Vaud	
22	Massongex Railway Bridge	126 m (413 ft)	126 m (413 ft)	Arch; Steel tied arch Bow-string bridge	Simplon Railway; Rhône	2017	Bex–Massongex; 46°14′06.6″N 6°59′55.7″E	Vaud; Valais	
23	A4 Highway Bridge over the Rhine	125 m (410 ft)	152 m (499 ft)	Cable-stayed; Concrete deck, 1 inclined concrete pylon 125+26	A4 motorway European route E41; Rhine	1995	Schaffhausen; 47°41′31.0″N 8°37′32.3″E	Schaffhausen	
24	Krummbach Bridge	124 m (407 ft)	621 m (2,037 ft)	Arch; Concrete deck arch	A9 motorway European route E62; Diveria	1978	Simplon; 46°11′31.0″N 8°03′52.5″E	Valais	
25	Sitter Viaduct (Südostbahn)	120 m (390 ft)	365 m (1,198 ft)	Truss bridge Steel	Bodensee–Toggenburg railway Sitter	1904	St. Gallen; 47°24′02.2″N 9°19′30.1″E	St. Gallen	
26	Chocolatière Viaduct	120 m (390 ft)	436 m (1,430 ft)	Arch; Concrete deck arch Twin bridges	A9 motorway European route E62; Flon	1964; 1973	Lausanne; 46°32′32.6″N 6°38′33.1″E	Vaud	
27	Schwarzwald Bridge	119 m (390 ft)	233 m (764 ft)	Box girder Prestressed concrete Quadruple bridges 55+119+59	A2 motorway A3 motorway European route E25; European route E35; European route E60; Rhine	1973	Basel; 47°33′28.9″N 7°36′50.1″E	Basel-Stadt	(Note: The length given only takes into account the main bridge, central span(s) and shore span(s), approach viaducts are not counted.)
28	Schwarzwald Railway Bridge	117 m (384 ft)	240 m (790 ft)	Box girder Prestressed concrete 60+117+60	Basel Connecting Line; Rhine	2012	Basel; 47°33′29.4″N 7°36′52.8″E	Basel-Stadt	
29	Saint-Maurice Bridge (N9-N21)	116 m (381 ft)	177 m (581 ft)	Beam bridge Concrete	Principal road 9 Principal road 21; Rhône	1957	Bex–Saint-Maurice; 46°13′21.0″N 7°00′18.1″E	Vaud; Valais	
30	Gottéron Bridge	116 m (381 ft)	176 m (577 ft)	Arch; Concrete deck arch	Road bridge Route de Bourguillon; Gottéron	1960	Fribourg; 46°48′15.7″N 7°10′18.3″E	Fribourg	
31	Kornhaus Bridge	115 m (377 ft)	355 m (1,165 ft)	Arch; Steel deck arch	Road bridge Aare	1898	Bern; 46°57′01.0″N 7°26′53.8″E	Bern	
32	Schwarzwasser Bridge	114 m (374 ft)	167 m (548 ft)	Arch; Steel deck arch	Road bridge Bernstrasse; Schwarzwasser	1882	Schwarzenburg–Köniz; 46°51′49.6″N 7°21′40.2″E	Bern	
33	Schwarzwasser Railway Bridge	114 m (374 ft)	179 m (587 ft)	Arch; Concrete deck arch	Bern–Schwarzenburg railway line Schwarzwasser	1979	Schwarzenburg–Köniz; 46°51′49.3″N 7°21′39.7″E	Bern	
34	Nanin Bridge	112 m (367 ft)	192 m (630 ft)	Arch; Concrete deck arch	A13 motorway European route E43; Moesa	1967	Mesocco; 46°49′42.5″N 9°24′54.9″E	Grisons	
35	Aigremont Bridge	109 m (358 ft)(x2)	515 m (1,690 ft)	Box girder Prestressed concrete 51+101+2x106+96	Road bridge Les Fiaudères; Raverette	1981	Ormont-Dessous; 46°21′39.2″N 7°04′23.3″E	Vaud	
36	New Gueuroz Bridge	108 m (354 ft)	170 m (560 ft)	Box girder Composite steel/concrete deck V-shaped legs	Road bridge Trient	1994	Vernayaz; 46°07′43.9″N 7°02′24.7″E	Valais	
37	Rheinfelden Bridge	108 m (354 ft)	228 m (748 ft)	Box girder Prestressed concrete	Road bridge Rhine	2006	Rheinfelden–Rheinfelden (Baden); 47°32′54.4″N 7°45′29.9″E	Aargau; Germany	
38	Veveyse de Fégire Bridge	107 m (351 ft)	512 m (1,680 ft)	Box girder Prestressed concrete	A12 motorway European route E27; Veveyse de Fégire	1981	Châtel-Saint-Denis–Saint-Légier-La Chiésaz; 46°30′45.0″N 6°54′27.6″E	Fribourg; Vaud	
39	Fridolins Bridge	106 m (348 ft)	244 m (801 ft)	Box girder Prestressed concrete 106+85+53	Road bridge Rhine	1979	Stein–Bad Säckingen; 47°32′46.2″N 7°56′57.5″E	Aargau; Germany	
40	Arch Bridge over the Aare	106 m (348 ft)	154 m (505 ft)	Arch; Steel tied arch	Road bridge Aarerstrasse; Aare	1997	Grenchen–Arch; 47°10′19.4″N 7°25′15.9″E	Solothurn; Bern	
41	Old Hundwil Gorge Bridge demolished in 1993	105 m (344 ft)	221 m (725 ft)	Arch; Concrete deck arch	Road bridge Urnäsch	1925	Hundwil; 47°21′42.3″N 9°18′08.7″E	Appenzell Ausserrhoden	
42	Lavoitobel Bridge	105 m (344 ft)	200 m (660 ft)	Arch; Concrete deck arch	Principal road 19; Lavoibach	1967	Tamins; 46°49′41.3″N 9°24′06.4″E	Grisons	
43	Three Roses Bridge	105 m (344 ft)	226 m (741 ft)	Beam bridge Composite steel concrete truss bridge 77+105+84	A3 motorway Road bridge Trams in Basel; Rhine	2004	Basel; 47°34′14.7″N 7°35′06.6″E	Basel-Stadt	
44	Viaduc de Chillon	104 m (341 ft)	2,150 m (7,050 ft)	Box girder Prestressed concrete 95+2×104+98+4×92 +98+104+98+4×92 +98+104+98+3×92; Twin bridges	A9 motorway European route E27; European route E62	1969	Montreux; 46°24′53.4″N 6°55′46.8″E	Vaud	
45	Paudèze Bridge	104 m (341 ft)(x3)	422 m (1,385 ft)	Box girder Prestressed concrete Twin bridges 58+3x104+52 64+104+98+92	A9 motorway European route E62; Paudèze	1974	Pully–Belmont-sur-Lausanne; 46°31′34.4″N 6°40′48.9″E	Vaud	
46	Creugenat Viaduct	104 m (341 ft)	559 m (1,834 ft)	Box girder Prestressed concrete Twin bridges 59+96+104+96+69	A16 motorway European route E27; Creugenat	2010	Porrentruy; 47°23′52.2″N 7°01′51.9″E	Canton of Jura	
47	Vulpera-Tarasp Bridge	104 m (341 ft)	236 m (774 ft)	Box girder Prestressed concrete	Road bridge Inn	2010	Scuol; 46°47′21.5″N 10°16′56.1″E	Grisons	
48	ÖBB Lustenau Rhine Bridge	102 m (335 ft)	276 m (906 ft)	Arch; Composite steel/concrete tied arch Bow-string bridge	St. Margrethen–Lauterach line Rhine	2013	St. Margrethen–Lustenau; 47°26′51.8″N 9°39′28.3″E	St. Gallen; Germany	
49	Langwieser Viaduct	100 m (330 ft)	287 m (942 ft)	Arch; Concrete deck arch	Chur–Arosa railway Plessur	1914	Langwies; 46°49′03.4″N 9°42′18.4″E	Grisons	
50	Tamins Bridge over the Rhine	100 m (330 ft)	158 m (518 ft)	Arch; Concrete deck arch	Principal road 19; Rhine	1962	Tamins; 46°49′42.7″N 9°24′54.9″E	Grisons	
51	Axenbergtobel Bridge	100 m (330 ft)	123 m (404 ft)	Box girder Prestressed concrete 100+23	Principal road 2 Axenbergtobel	1983	Flüelen–Sisikon; 46°55′39.7″N 8°36′46.4″E	Uri	

== Major footbridges ==
	Name	Span	Height	Type	Carries Crosses	Opened	Location	Canton	Ref.
1	Charles Kuonen Suspension Bridge	494 m (1,621 ft)	85 m (279 ft)	Suspension; Steel	Footbridge; Dorfbach	2017	Randa; 46°06′04.3″N 7°48′05.4″E	Valais	
2	Raiffeisen Skywalk	374 m (1,227 ft)	58 m (190 ft)	Suspension; Steel	Footbridge; Lauitobel	2010	Sattel; 47°4′9.6″N 8°39′14″E	Schwyz	
3	Sigriswil Panorama Bridge	300 m (980 ft)	180 m (590 ft)	Suspension; Steel	Footbridge; Gutenbach	2014	Sigriswil; 46°43′06.8″N 7°42′25.7″E	Bern	
4	Goms Bridge	280 m (920 ft)	92 m (302 ft)	Suspension; Steel	Footbridge; Rhône	2015	Goms District; 46°24′35.7″N 8°09′09.9″E	Valais	
5	Carasc Suspension Bridge	270 m (890 ft)	130 m (430 ft)	Suspension; Steel	Footbridge; Sementina	2015	Sementina–Monte Carasso; 46°11′41.0″N 8°58′29.9″E	Ticino	
6	Milibach Suspension Bridge	260 m (850 ft)	65 m (213 ft)	Suspension; Steel	Footbridge; Milibach	2022	Unterbäch–Eischoll; 46°17′22″N 7°47′35″E	Valais	
7	Niouc Footbridge	200 m (660 ft)	190 m (620 ft)	Suspension; Steel	Footbridge; Navisence	1922	Anniviers; 46°15′48.9″N 7°33′20.8″E	Valais	
8	Corbassière Suspension Bridge	190 m (620 ft)	70 m (230 ft)	Suspension; Steel	Footbridge; Corbassière Glacier	2014	Fionnay; 46°00′21.1″N 7°17′23.1″E	Valais	
9	Troistorrents-Chenarlier Suspension Bridge	185 m (607 ft)	75 m (246 ft)	Suspension; Steel	Footbridge; Vièze	2021	Troistorrents; 46°13′46.0″N 6°55′19.5″E	Valais	
10	Grub-Grub Suspension Bridge	180 m (590 ft)	40 m (130 ft)	Suspension; Steel	Footbridge; Steinlibach	2019	Grub; 47°27′02.9″N 9°31′03.4″E	Appenzell Ausserrhoden	
11	Trift Bridge	170 m (560 ft)	100 m (330 ft)	Suspension; Steel	Footbridge; Triftsee	2009	Gadmen; 46°41′39″N 8°21′27.2″E	Bern	
12	Aspi-Titter Suspension Bridge	160 m (520 ft)	120 m (390 ft)	Suspension; Steel	Footbridge; Weisswasser river	2016	Fieschertal–Bellwald; 46°26′44.0″N 8°08′20.2″E	Valais	
13	Hostalde Suspension Bridge	153 m (502 ft)	38 m (125 ft)	Suspension; Steel	Footbridge; Bergbach Engstlige	2006	Frutigen; 46°33′36.4″N 7°37′01.9″E	Bern	
14	Jorette Bridge	150 m (490 ft)	28 m (92 ft)	Suspension; Steel	Footbridge; Avançon (Mayen)	2012	Torgon; 46°18′54.8″N 6°51′50.7″E	Valais	

== Other bridges ==
Geneva

- Hans Wilsdorf Bridge
- Pont du Mont-Blanc
- Viaduc de la Jonction

Zurich

- Bahnhofbrücke
- Hardbrücke
- Postbrücke
- Münsterbrücke
- Quaibrücke
- Rathausbrücke

== See also ==
- Transport in Switzerland
- Motorways of Switzerland
- Rail transport in Switzerland
- Geography of Switzerland
- List of bridges
- List of rivers of Switzerland
- List of Aare bridges in Bern
- List of bridges over the Rhine
- de:Liste der gedeckten Brücken in der Schweiz (in German) - List of covered bridges in Switzerland
- de:Liste der höchsten Brücken in der Schweiz (in German) - List of highest bridges in Switzerland
- List of bridges by river: de:Albula, de:Alpenrhein, de:Areuse, de:Birs, de:Dünnern, de:Engelberger Aa, de:Ergolz, de:Furkareuss, de:Glâne, de:Glatt (Rhein), de:Glatt (Thur), de:Glenner, de:Julia, de:Kleine Emme, de:Landquart, de:Landwasser, de:Limmat, de:Linth, de:Alte Lorze, de:Lorze, de:Medelser Rhein, de:Mentue, de:Muota, de:Murg (Thur), de:Necker, de:Plessur, de:Rabiusa, de:Reuss, de:Seez, de:Sense, de:Sihl, de:Sitter, de:Sorne, de:Suhre, de:Tamina, de:Thur, de:Töss, de:Valser Rhein, de:Vorderrhein, de:Waldemme, de:Weissemme, de:Wigger, de:Wyna, de:Zürichsee

== Notes and references ==
- Notes
- "Inventory of Cultural Property of National and Regional Importance". babs.admin.ch - Federal Office for Civil Protection FOCP.
- Nicolas Janberg. "International Database for Civil and Structural Engineering". Structurae.com.
- Werner Minder. "Die Schweizerischen Holzbrücken" [The Swiss Wooden Bridges]. swiss-timber-bridges.ch (in German).
- Others references
