= Eyholztunnel =

Road tunnel in Switzerland

- Interactive map of Eyholztunnel

Overview
- Line: A9 motorway (Switzerland)
- Location: Switzerland (Visp, Brig-Glis)
- Coordinates: 46.27762°N 7.88370°E (West portal); 46.29683°N 7.92659°E (East portal)
- Status: Active since 13. April 2018
- System: Swiss Highway System
- Crosses: Alps
- Start: Brig-Glis, (East)
- End: Visp, (West)

Operation
- Work began: 2007
- Opened: 13. April 2018

The Eyholztunnel (also Eyholz Tunnel) is a 4.25 kilometre long tunnel of the Swiss highway A9, serving as a bypass of the town of Visp in the canton of Valais. The design of the tunnel began in 2005, the traffic handover took place on 13 April 2018.

== Construction ==
The construction of the tunnel was assigned to the Eyholz main tunnel consortium (Arge AHE), which includes the companies Frutiger AG, Interalp Bau AG from Visp, CSC – a subsidiary of the Italian Salini Impregilo – and the Austrian Jäger Bau. The tunnel leads through unconsolidated rock, breccia and calcareous mica schist. In loose rock, a distance of 315 m (1,033 ft) had to be covered with a jet screen, which was installed using the jet grouting method. The rest of the tunnels were excavated using blasting.

The excavated material was transported north with a conveyor belt via a tunnel dug in the axis of the north tube of the Visp Tunnel, which was excavated with a tunnel boring machine and had a diameter of 4.2 m (14 ft). It was completed in 2006 and was later expanded to form the north tube of the Visp tunnel. From the north portal of the adit the excavation reaches the Goler deposit near Raron via another 3.2 km-long (2.0 mi) conveyor belt. Therefore, no truck transports were necessary for the excavation transport.

Preparatory work for the tunnel construction began in 2005. First, the tunneling through the loose rock at the east portal and the excavation of the branching caverns took place in 2008, which had an excavation width of 26 m (85 ft). The excavation was particularly difficult over a length of about 85 m (279 ft) in the southern cavern because the area was cut by a less stable graphite zone.

The main drive of the southern tube began in April 2009, that of the northern tube on May 23, 2009. The breakthroughs took place on August 31, 2012 in the southern tube and in October 2012 in the northern tube. The traffic handover took place on April 13, 2018.

In connection with the construction, there were discussions about the additional demand made by AHE for 60 million Swiss francs . It was justified with increased effort due to the difficult geology, changed concrete and disrupted construction process. The consortium used poor-quality concrete over a length of 600 m (2,000 ft) for the false ceiling to the ventilation duct, which had to be demolished and replaced.

== Design ==
The tunnel is used for through traffic in the Rhone Valley, but also for traffic from Zermatt and Saas-Fee towards Brig and the Simplon Pass, which no longer has to go through Visp.

The western portal is located at the Staldbachbrücke, shortly after the portal each tube widens to form a branching cavern, in which the Vispertal Ost semi-connection is located. The exit for traffic from Brig in the direction of Vispertal is in the north tube, which required a 280 m-long (920 ft) cavern. The access road for traffic from the Vispertal in the direction of Brig is in the southern tube, which required a 445 m-long (1,460 ft) cavern. A single-lane tunnel connects to the entrance and exit, which creates the connection to the road in the Vispertal. The other portal of the A9 tunnel is east of Eyholz near the hamlet of Grosshüs in the municipality of Brig-Glis.

Two lanes of the A9 run in each of the two tubes with a horseshoe-shaped cross-section, with a one-meter-wide sidewalk on either side. A 2 m-wide (6.6 ft) and 2.9 m-high (9.5 ft) walk-in service duct is located under the lanes of each tube, and the ventilation duct with a cross-section of 13 m^{2} (140 sq ft) is located above the lane, which is separated from the lane tunnel by an intermediate ceiling. The tunnel tubes run at a distance of 30 m (98 ft) from each other, which is reduced to 10 m (33 ft) at the portals. They are connected to each other with 16 cross passages. At each portal there is a ventilation center which, in the event of a fire breaking out, can extract the smoky air via the ventilation duct. In normal operation, ventilation is provided by ceiling fans.

== Visp Tunnel ==
The Eyholztunnel is the eastern segment of a full bypass around Visp and towns west of Visp. The western segment, called the Visp tunnel or TuVi, will be 2,900 meters long. It began construction in 2018, and is planned for completion in 2025. The Visp tunnel extends from Schwarzer Graben (West portal, in the Visp valley) to Staldbach-Grosshus (east portal; also the west portal of the Eyholztunnel). The Visp tunnel runs partially along the route of an older, abandoned tunnel, named the Vispertaltunnel or Visp Valley Tunnel.
