= Chillon (disambiguation) =

Chillon refers to Chillon Castle on the homonymous island in Switzerland. In the vicinity are:

- Fort de Chillon, a twentieth-century fortification adjacent to Chillon Castle
- Viaduc de Chillon, a motorway viaduct overlooking Chillon Castle

Chillon may also refer to:

- Chillón, a municipality in Spain
- Chillón River, a river in Peru
- Alberto Chillon, an Italian rugby union player
