= Viaduc de Chillon =

Road bridge in Veytaux, Switzerland

Coordinates: 46°24′55.45″N 6°55′45.64″E

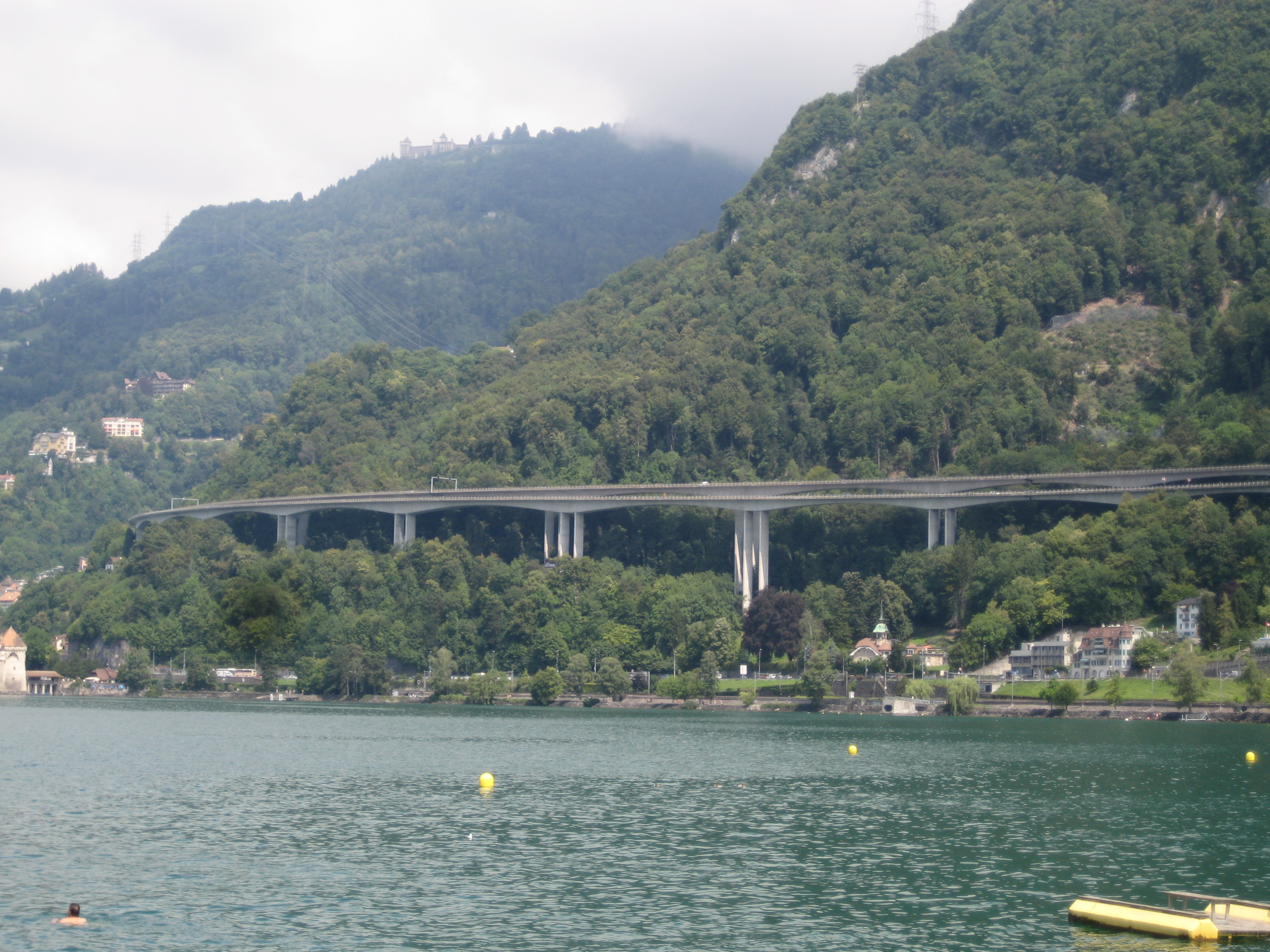
The Viaduc de Chillon from the east

The Viaduc de Chillon is a viaduct in Switzerland located in Veytaux to the southeast of Montreux. Built by the Consortium des Viaducs de Chillon between 1966 and 1969, it takes its name from the Château de Chillon which lies downhill on the shores of Lac Léman. The viaduct comprises two structures 12 metres (39 ft) wide carrying the east and westbound lanes of the Swiss A9 autoroute.

The choice of a viaduct was dictated by the steeply-sloping terrain, the need to avoid extensive deforestation and the esthetic implications of the proximity of the Château de Chillon. A tunnel was considered for the site, but was rejected to keep costs down. The bridge uses prefabricated concrete parts, assembled from a crane spanning overhead from pier to pier

The two viaducts span a total of 2,150 metres (7,050 ft) at a height of 100 metres (330 ft) above the lake. The two structures are staggered by several metres in height. The supporting piers are between 3 and 45 metres (148 ft) high and are separated by spans of 92 metres (302 ft), 98 metres (322 ft)} or 104 metres (341 ft). At the northern end of the viaduct, the road enters the Glion Tunnel. The southern end of the viaduct ends on the heights of Villeneuve. The viaduct offers an expansive view of Lac Léman, the Chablais, and Haute-Savoie on the opposite side of the lake.

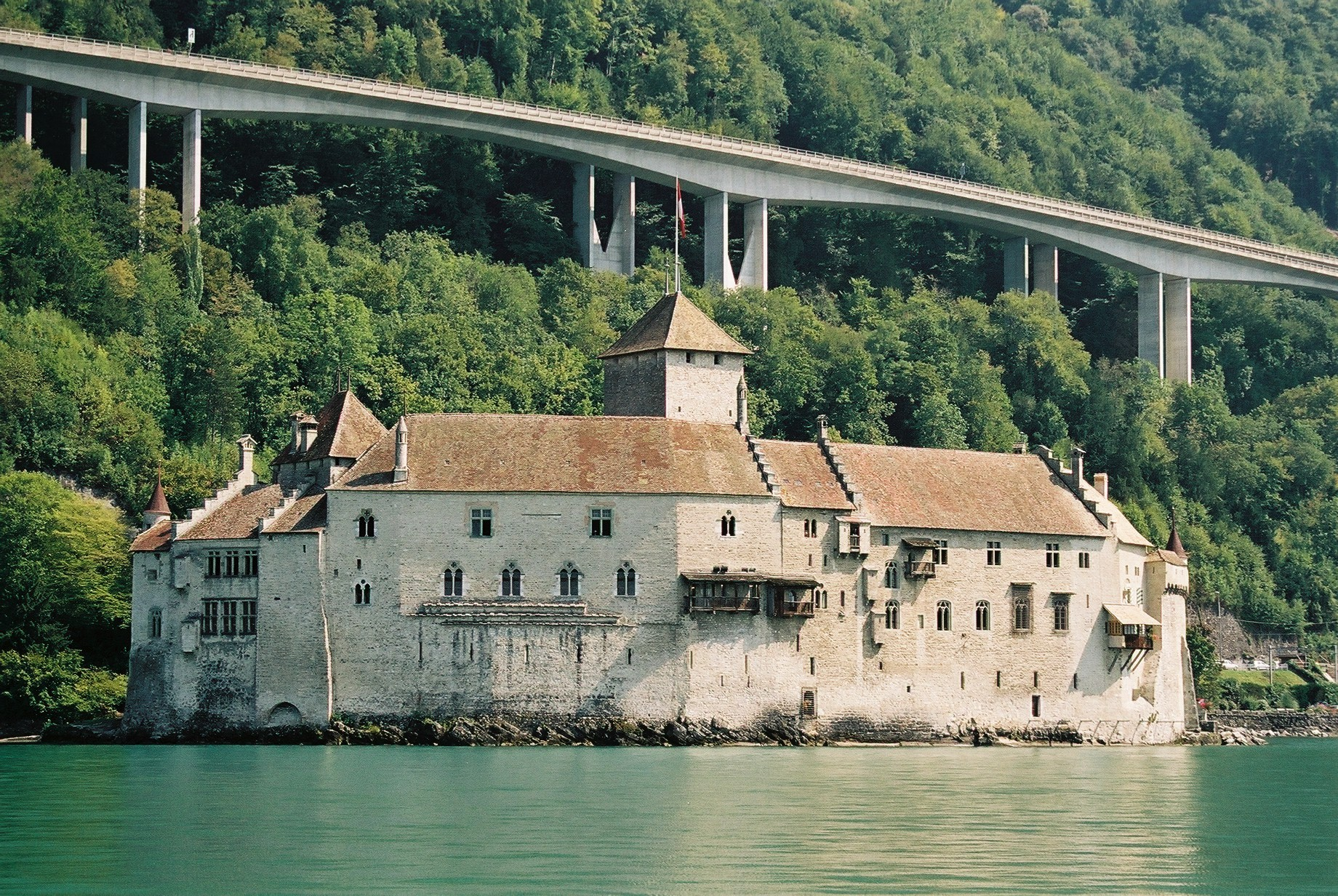
The Château de Chillon with the Viaduc de Chillon in the background
