= Salbitbrücke =

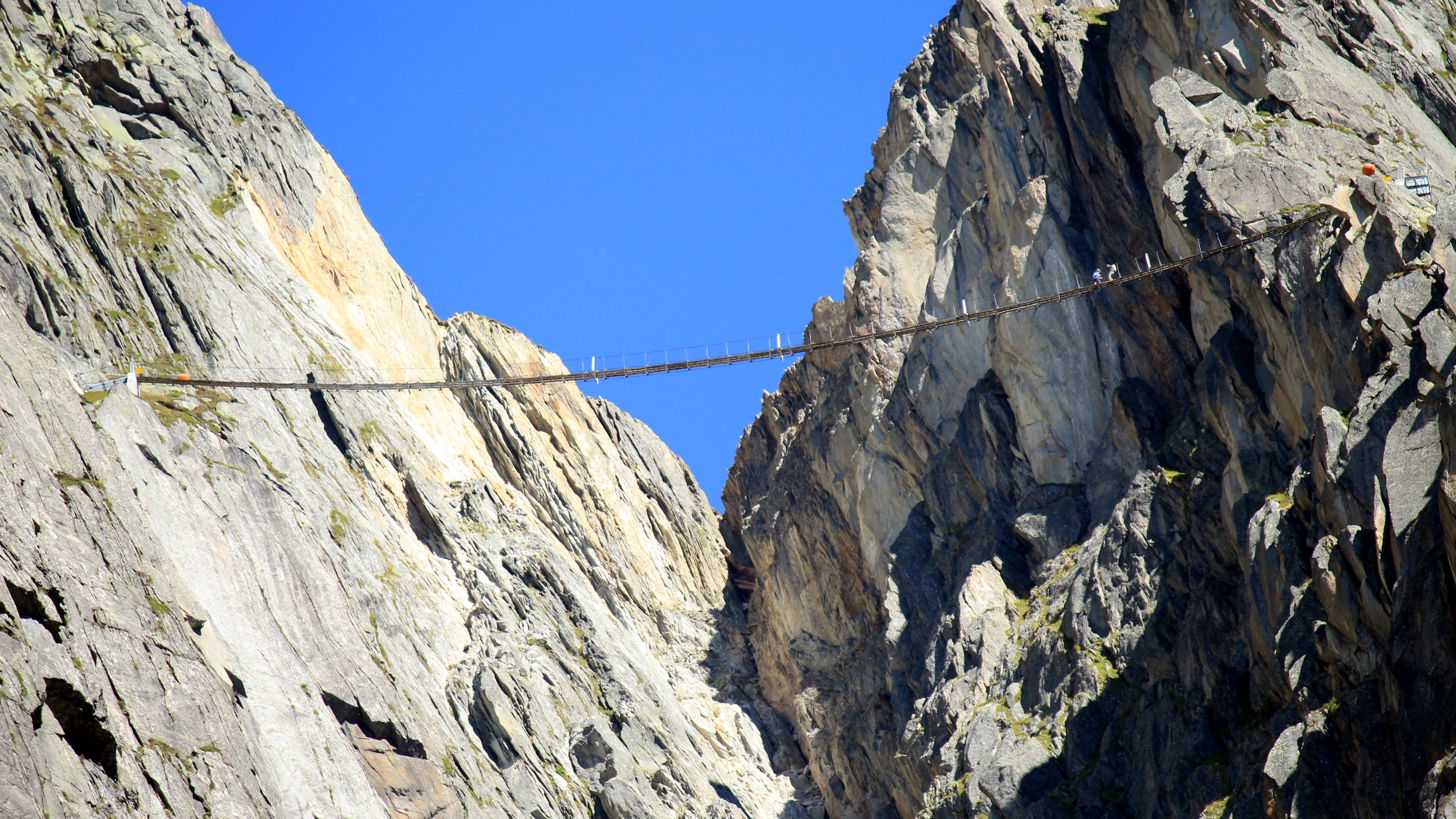
- Coordinates: 46°40′31.8″N 8°31′42.5″E
- Locale: Göschenen
- Owner: Association Salbit bridge (Verein Salbitbrücke)
- Website: www.salbitbruecke.ch

Characteristics
- Total length: 90 metres (300 ft)
- Width: 64 cm (25 in)
- Height: 122 m (400 ft)
- Traversable?: June to mid-October
- Load limit: >600 ppl.

History
- Constructed by: Esotec GmbH (Walter Brog)
- Built: April to mid-June 2010
- Construction cost: 280'000 CHF
- Inaugurated: 19 June 2010

Location
- Interactive map of Salbitbrücke

The Salbitbrücke is a high alpine pedestrian bridge in the canton of Uri in Switzerland. The bridge is located at an elevation of approximately 2,380 metres above sea level.

== Location ==
The Salbitbrücke is on the south flank of the Salbitschijen mountain. To get to the bridge, there is an alpine hiking route that takes 4–5 hours (difficulty level T4). The bridge connects the Swiss Alpine Club huts Voralphütte and Salbithütte via a hiking route.

== Description ==
Ropes and straps can be rented in the Salbithütte and the Voralphütte, which is generally recommended.

The bridge is 90 metres (300 ft) long and 64 centimetres (25 in) wide and hangs 122 metres (400 ft) above the valley floor.

The unstiffened suspension design of the bridge is based on the model of Nepalese rope bridges. The bridge incorporates elements of the former Trift Bridge, which was dismantled in the Bernese Oberland and re-erected in the Göschener Alp in the canton of Uri.

At the time of the bridge’s opening, a nearby hut warden expressed doubt that it would attract large numbers of tourists, citing the long and demanding approach hike.

== Gallery ==
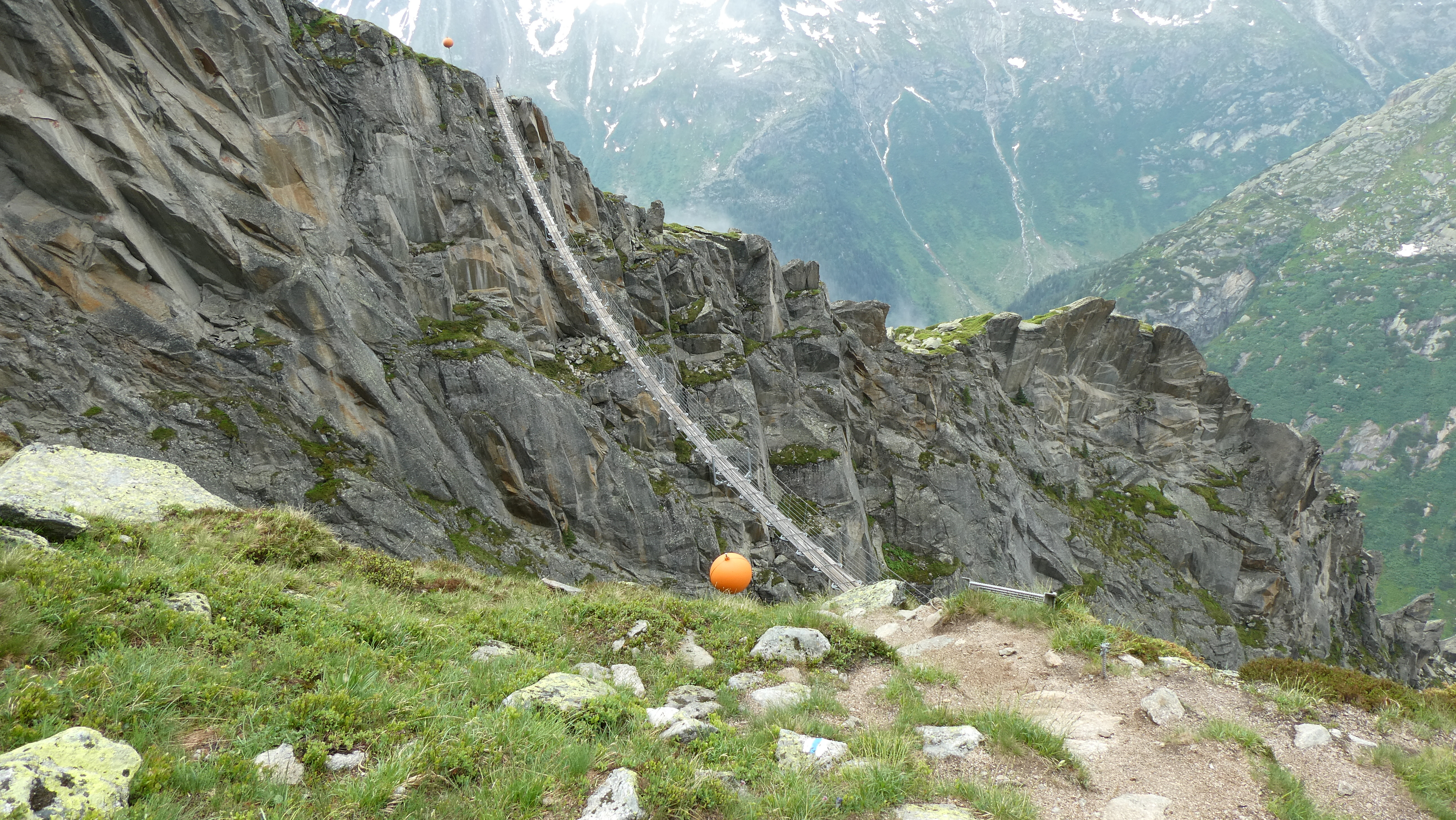
From the west

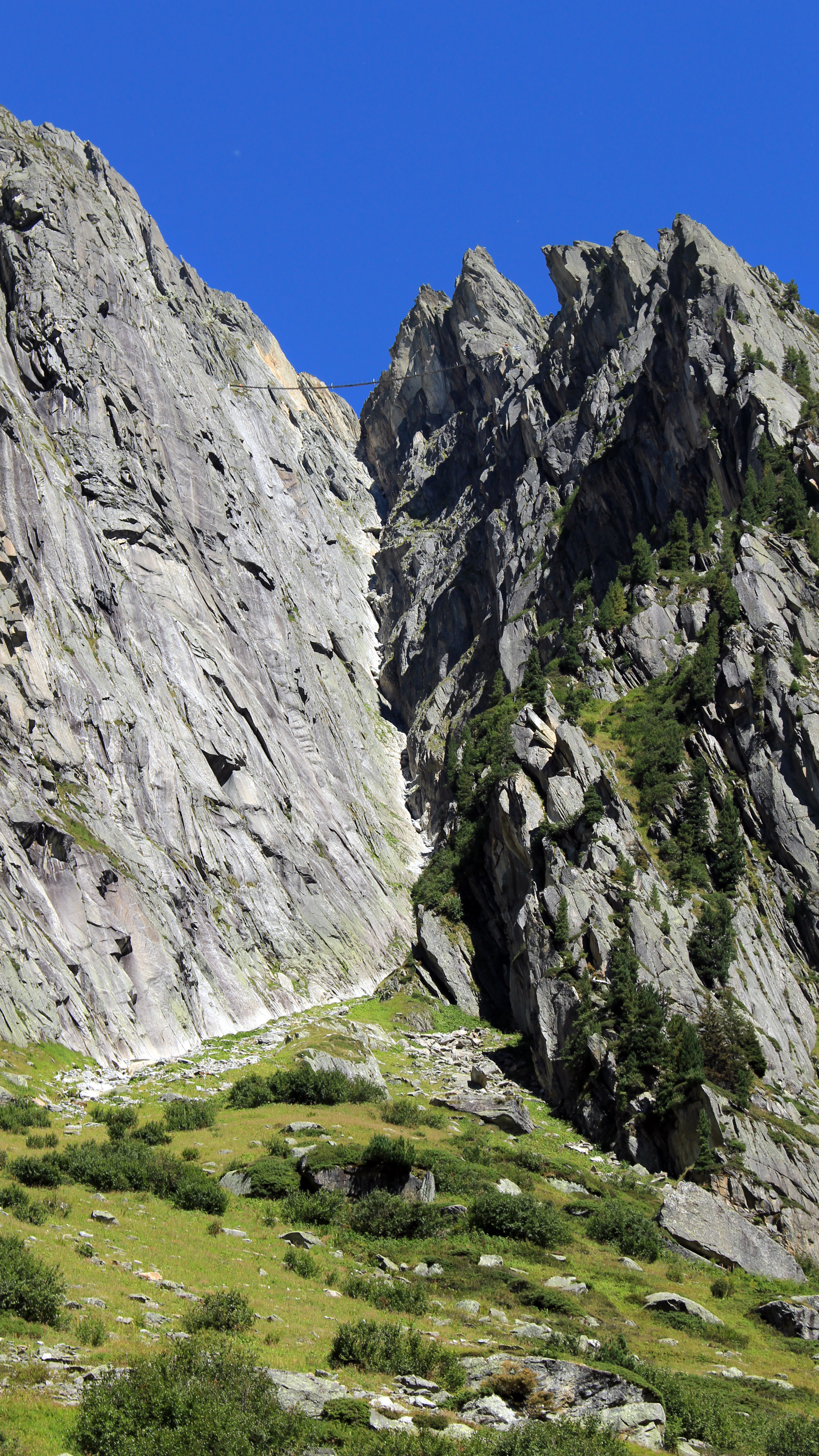
From below

== See also ==
- Charles Kuonen Suspension Bridge
- Trift Bridge
