= Pont du Mont-Blanc =

Bridge in Geneva, Switzerland

Coordinates: 46.2059°N 6.1487°E

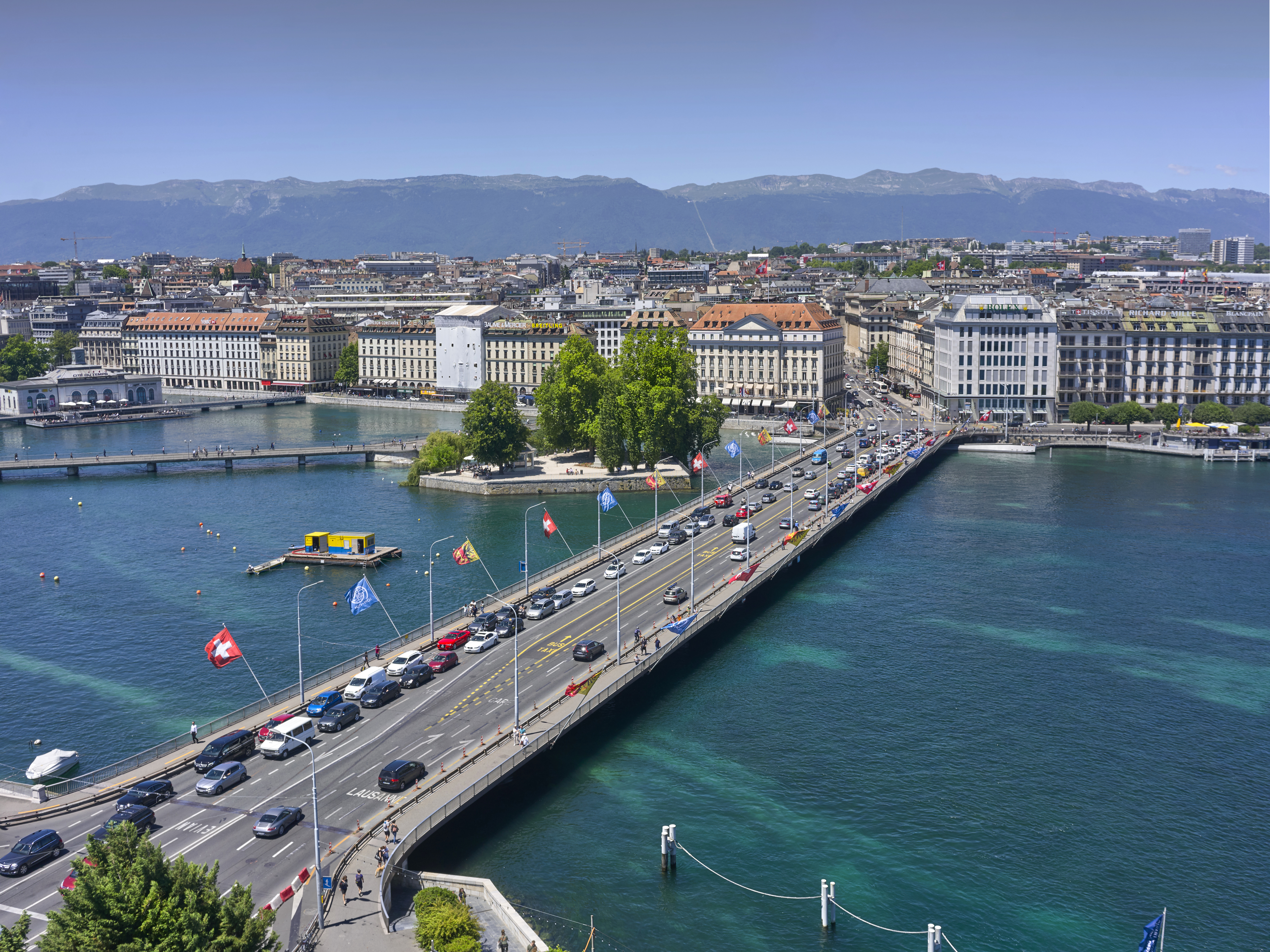
Pont du Mont-Blanc from the south, with the Rhône (left) and Lake Geneva (right)

The Pont du Mont-Blanc (French pronunciation: [pɔ̃ dy mɔ̃ blɑ̃]), sometimes anglicized as Mont Blanc Bridge, is a major bridge in Geneva. It connect the quarters of the left banks of the Rhône to those of the right banks. It is a major north–south road axis in the Canton of Geneva, since its inauguration in 1862. The bridge is about 250 metres long. The bridge is named after Mont Blanc, the highest massif in the Alps, well visible from Geneva.

The bridge notably marks the transition between Lake Geneva, in particular the Geneva Harbor (Rade de Genève), and the Rhône. On the National Map of Switzerland, the water on its left is indicated as river and the water on its right is indicated as lake. A few metres west of the bridge (in the Rhône) is the Ile Rousseau.

== See also ==
- List of bridges in Switzerland
