= Hans Wilsdorf Bridge =

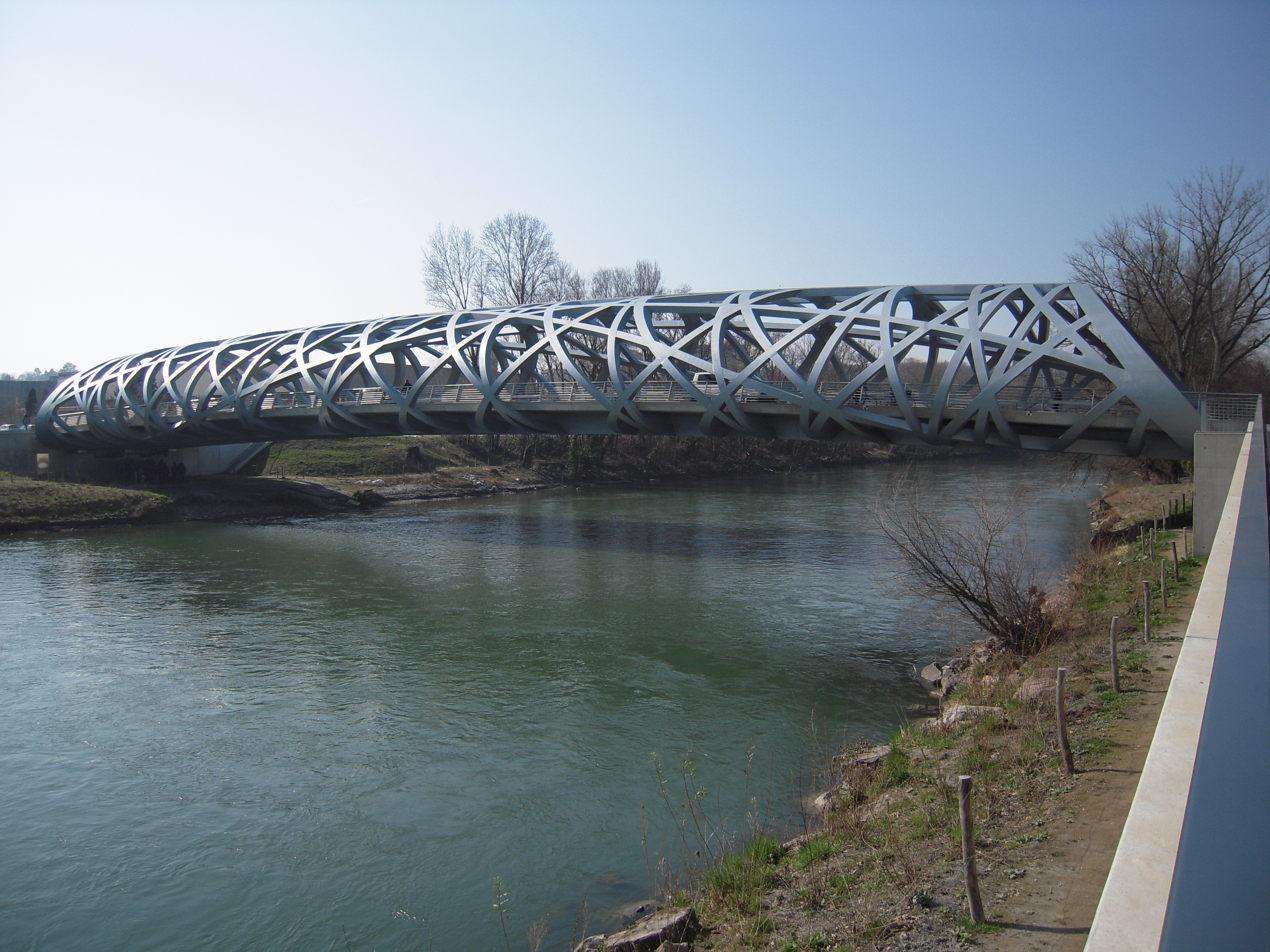
- Coordinates: 46.1952°N 6.1361°E
- Carries: 2 lanes and sidewalks
- Crosses: Arve river
- Other name: Pont Hans-Wilsdorf
- Named for: Hans Wilsdorf

Characteristics
- Total length: 85.4 metres (280 ft)
- Width: 15.5 metres (51 ft)
- Longest span: 85.4 metres (280 ft)
- No. of spans: 1
- Piers in water: 0

History
- Architect: Brodbeck and Roulet
- Construction start: 2009
- Construction end: 2012
- Opened: 2012
- Replaces: Pont Vernets

The Hans Wilsdorf Bridge (French: Pont Hans-Wilsdorf) is a bridge in Geneva, Switzerland.

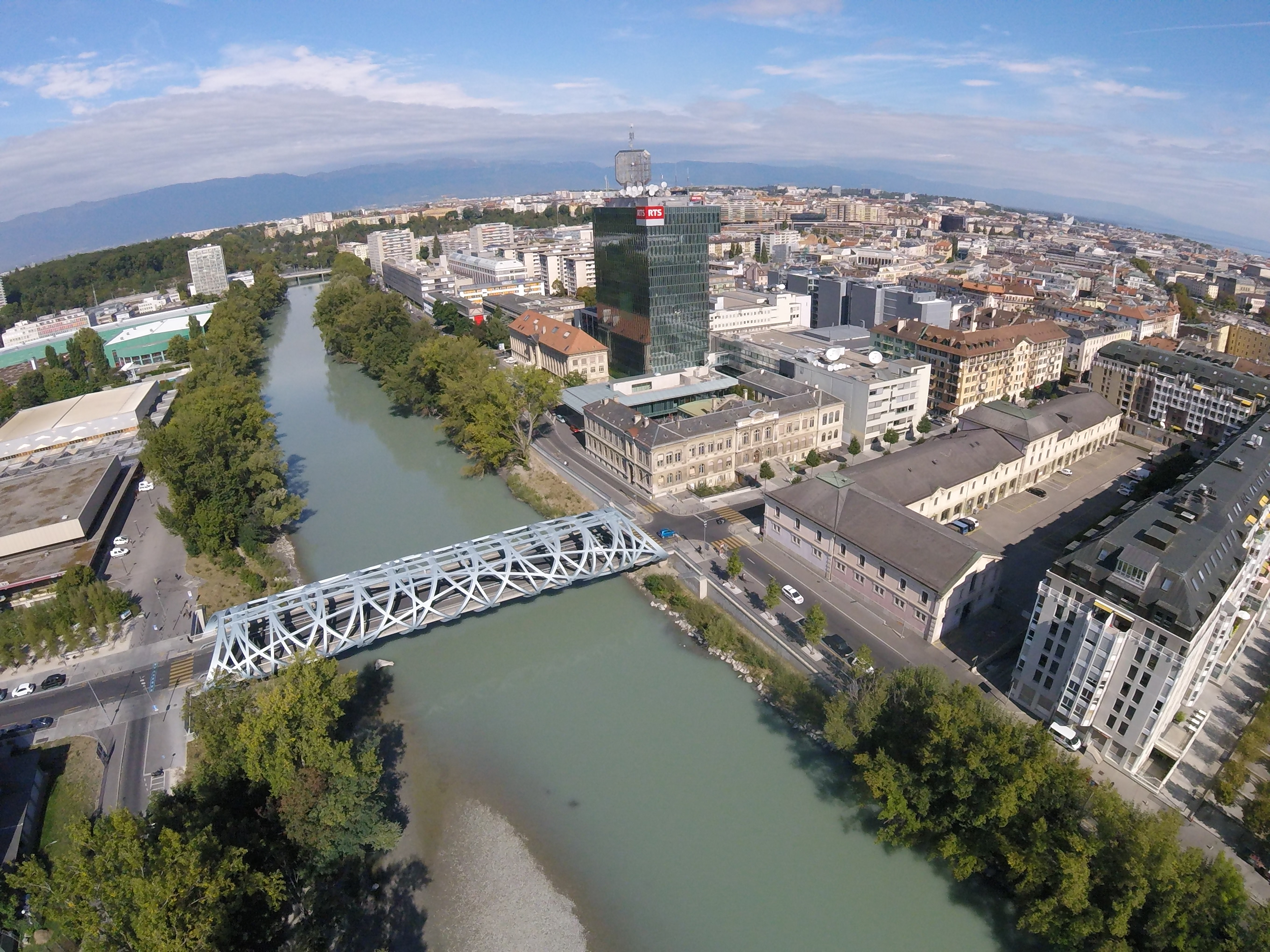
The Hans Wilsdorf Bridge, aerial view

== History ==
In 1962, a temporary bridge was built by the military across the Arve which would later be replaced by the Hans Wilsdorf Bridge. Construction began in 2009 and was completed in 2012. The bridge opened on 30 August 2012. It is named after Hans Wilsdorf, the founder of Rolex.

== See also ==
- Peace Bridge (Calgary)
- List of bridges in Switzerland
