= Salbitschijen =

Mountain in Switzerland

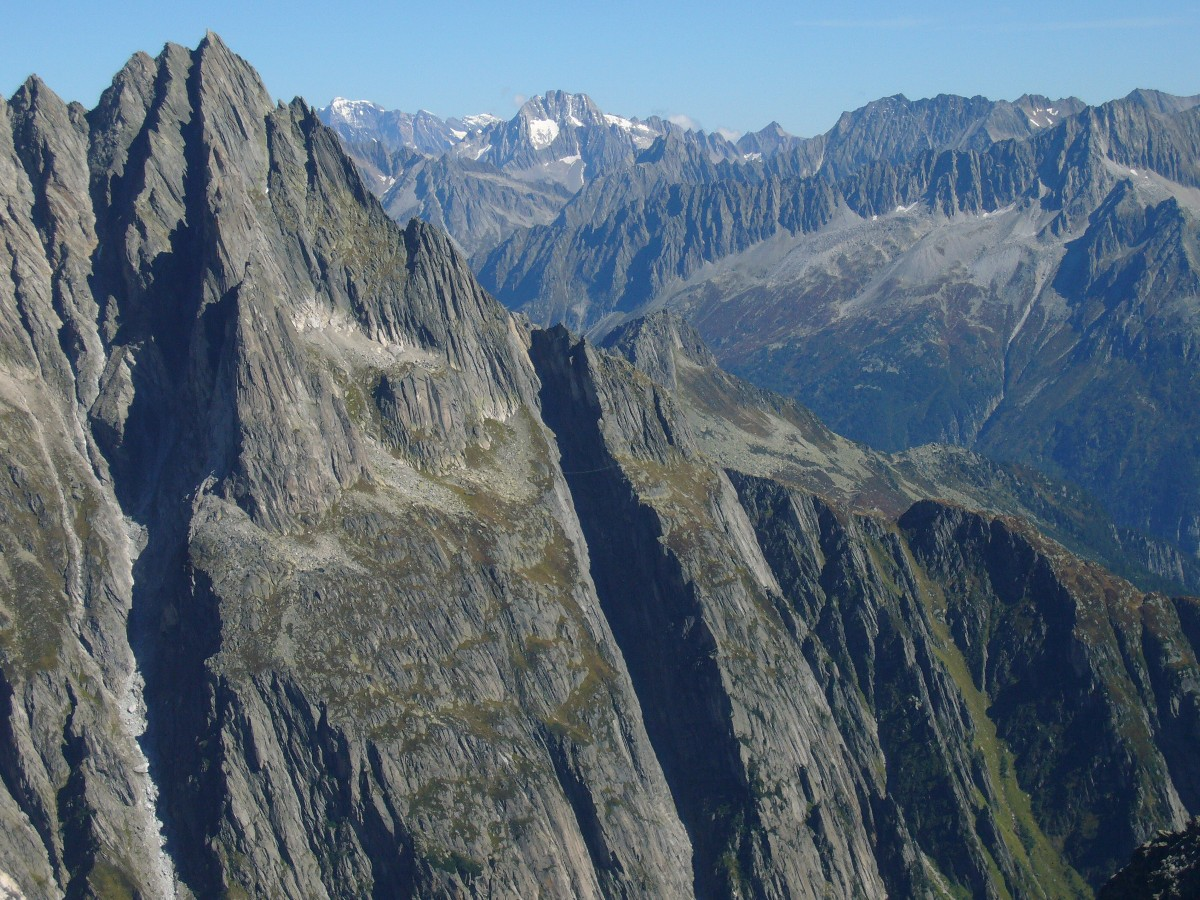
- Salbitschijen from West across the valley of Voralptal, the bridge can be seen in the center of the picture

Highest point
- Elevation: 2,981 m (9,780 ft)
- Prominence: 91 m (299 ft)
- Parent peak: Fleckistock
- Coordinates: 46°40′49.7″N 08°31′45.9″E

Geography
- Location within Switzerland
- Location: Uri, Switzerland
- Parent range: Urner Alps

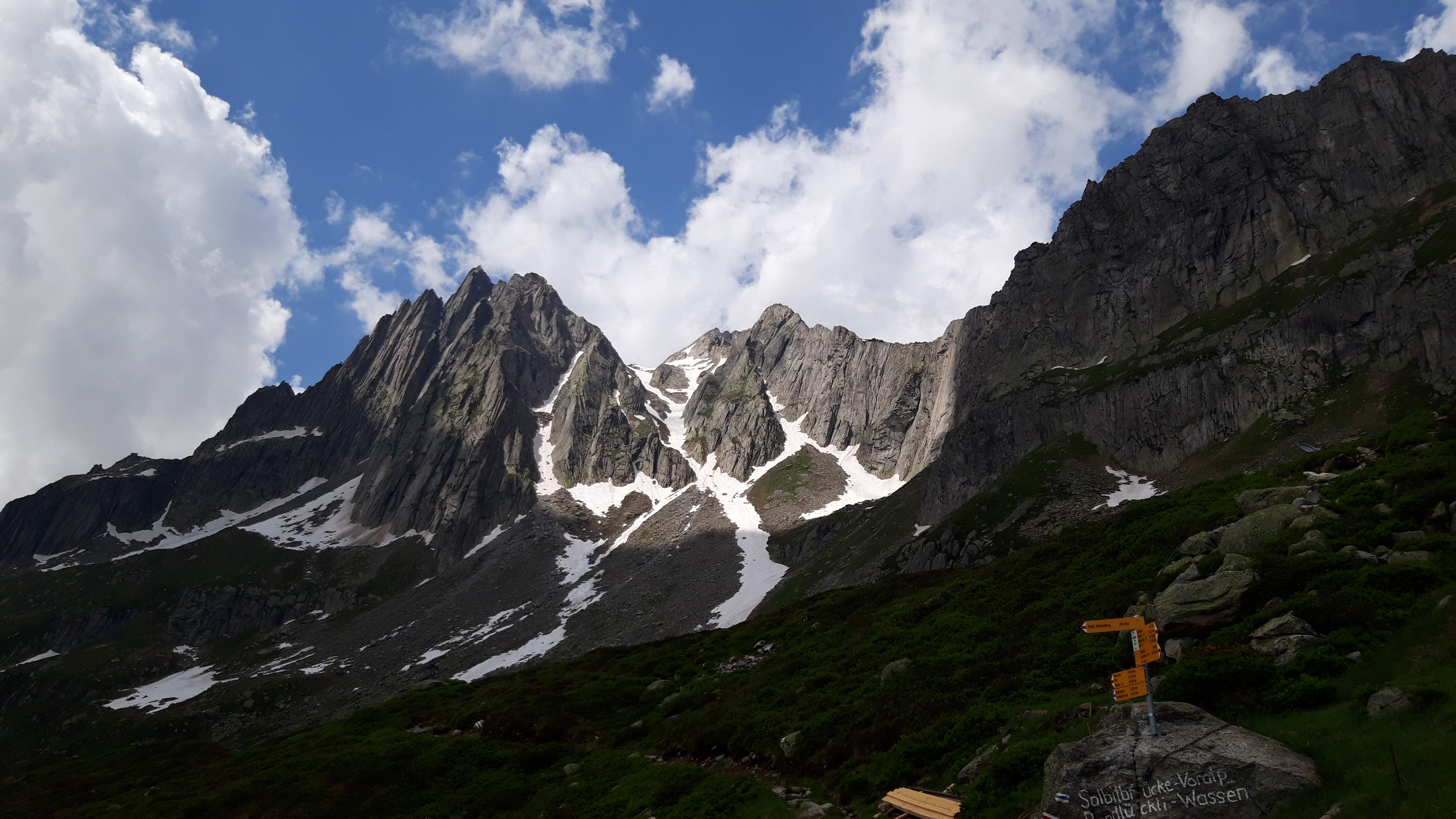
From the Salbithütte.

The Salbitschijen is a mountain in the Urner Alps, overlooking Göschenen in the Swiss canton of Uri. It lies at the southern extremity of the range of the Fleckistock.

It is known for its rock climbing opportunities; the ridges from the south being firstly climbed in 1935 while the western ridge, that was thought to be inaccessible to earlier climbers, was first climbed in 1948.

In 2009 a high level suspension bridge (Salbitbrücke) was installed on its southern flank, making it possible to pass from the Salbithütte to the Voralphütte without the use of climbing gear. It is nevertheless an exposed path and most people will use via ferrata equipment to traverse the bridge and the following ridge. Such equipment can be hired at the nearby huts Voralphütte and Salbithütte of the Swiss Alpine Club.
