= Peace Bridge (Calgary) =

Bridge on Bow River in Calgary, Alberta, Canada

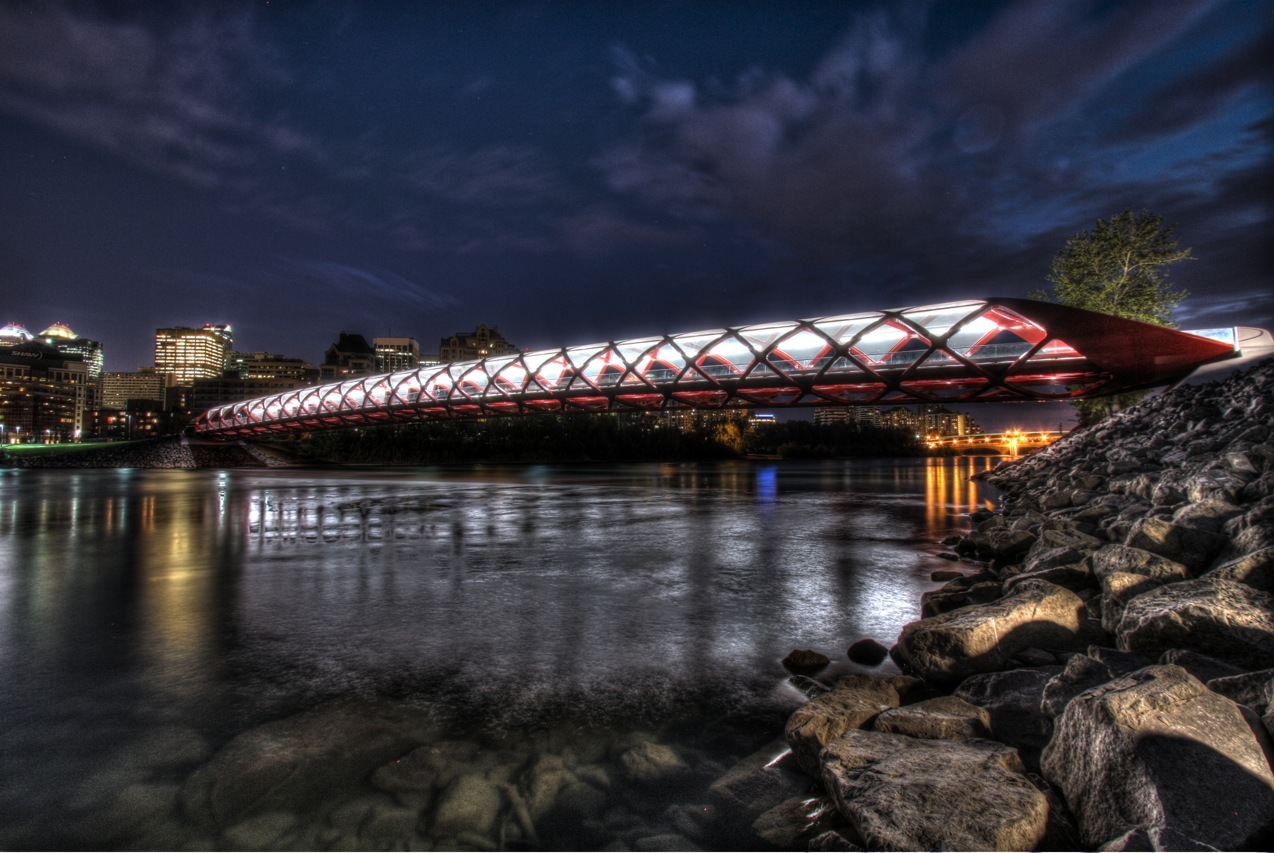
- Coordinates: 51.05389°N 114.07883°W
- Carries: Pedestrian pathway, bike path
- Crosses: Bow River
- Official name: Peace Bridge
- Maintained by: City of Calgary

Characteristics
- Design: Double helix tubular truss
- Material: Steel
- Total length: Out to Out 130.6 meters (428 ft)
- Width: 6.2 meters (20 ft)
- Height: 5.85 meters (19.2 ft)
- No. of spans: 1
- Piers in water: 0

History
- Designer: Santiago Calatrava
- Constructed by: Graham Group Ltd.
- Construction start: March 2010
- Construction end: March 2012
- Opened: 2012-03-24

Location
- Interactive map of Peace Bridge

Peace Bridge is a bridge that accommodates people walking and cycling across the Bow River in Calgary, Alberta, Canada. The bridge was designed by Spanish architect Santiago Calatrava and opened on March 24, 2012.

The City of Calgary built the bridge to connect the southern Bow River pathway and Downtown Calgary with the northern Bow River pathway and the community of Sunnyside. This connection was designed to accommodate the increasing number of people commuting to and from work and those utilizing Calgary's pathways. Approximately 9000 visitors per day reportedly use the bridge and has ranked among the top 10 architectural projects in 2012 and among the top 10 public spaces of 2012.

== Design ==
The design follows strict requirements with no piers in the water (in an effort to minimize the ecological footprint) and restricted height (due to the vicinity of the City/Bow River Heliport).

The bridge has also been designed to:

- Withstand Calgary's one-in-100 year flood cycle
- Meet a minimum 75-year lifespan
- Allow barrier-free access for people of all mobility types
- Provide comfort and security through lighting

The bridge is a departure from Calatrava's previous designs, which were typically asymmetric shapes anchored by high masts. Another atypical element is the color; while most of Calatrava's designs are white, the Peace Bridge features red and white as used in both the flag of Canada and the flag of Calgary.

Features

- Helical steel structure with a glass roof (850-tonne steel)
- A width of 6.3 metres – double the width of other pedestrian bridges in the area
- Segregated bicycle and pedestrian traffic
- Lighting for nighttime use

Materials used

- Steel for the arches
- Reinforced concrete abutments & deck

Dimensions

- Span length: Tube girder 126 meters (413 ft)
- Total length: Out to out 130.6 meters (428 ft)
- Total width: 8 meters (26 ft)
- Total height: 5.85 meters (19.2 ft)
- Inside width: 6.2 meters (20 ft) (3.7 meters (12 ft) for pedestrian and 2.5 meters (8.2 ft) for cycleway)

=== Cost ===
Funding for the Peace Bridge was provided by the city's capital budget. For the transportation department, targeted expenditures of capital are directed by the Transportation Infrastructure Investment Program (TIIP), which defines the priority and timing of major infrastructure construction projects. This program emphasizes pedestrian and cycling in high-density areas where these modes are more efficient at moving people, supporting land use, and lessening environmental impacts. As of February 2012, the approximate costs were:

- Total: $24.5 Million
- Construction: $17.995 million
- Architectural and structural design, specialized engineering, and quality assurance: $3.9 million
- Project administration and contingency: $2.6 million

== History ==
On September 8, 2008, Calgary City Council approved report LPT2008-49 which set aside $25 million for the Pedestrian Gateways project for two bridges across the Bow River: one west of Prince's Island Park and one at the west of St. George's Island. The decision directed the Administration to design and build one bridge and develop a concept design for a second one.

Construction started in March 2010. A temporary structure was built immediately upstream from the bridge location and served as a place to assemble the bridge before moving it to its final position.

The tubular bridge was manufactured in Spain and shipped to Calgary. Assembly of the bridge pieces started in Fall 2010 and the bridge was moved across the Bow River in November 2011.

During routine weld inspection, it was discovered that some of the welds did not comply with quality standards. As a result, the city hired an independent inspection company to do a more thorough inspection of the welds completed in Spain. The added inspections, red flags about the steel work's esthetics, weld repairs, and issues with damaged concrete slabs all contributed to multiple delays in the opening of the bridge.

The bridge, originally supposed to be opened in the fall of 2010, opened to the public on March 24, 2012.

To commemorate Canada Day 150, the Red Ball Project was installed for a day (June 26, 2017) on Calgary's Peace Bridge.

In 2022, the bridge suffered repeated vandalism, its glass panels being damaged. In order to reduce the cost of replacing the glass, the city consulted with Calatrava and decided to install steel cables instead, to be completed in fall 2023. The benefits of the proposed changes include reducing annual maintenance costs by $35,000, ensuring the bridge remains easy to maintain by using readily available materials, and enhancing safety and durability by employing a material more resistant to vandalism.

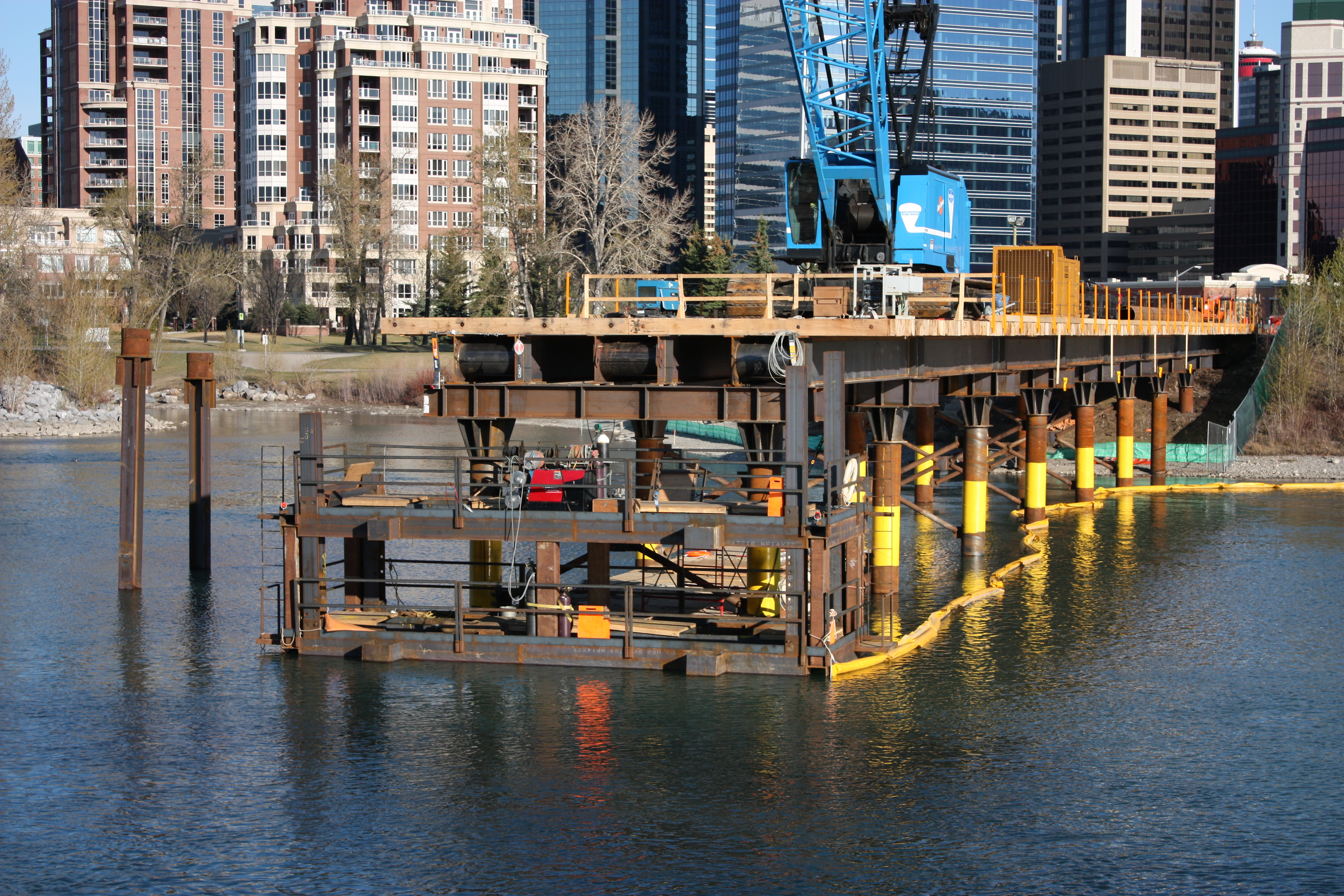
The temporary bridge built to support the construction in May 2010

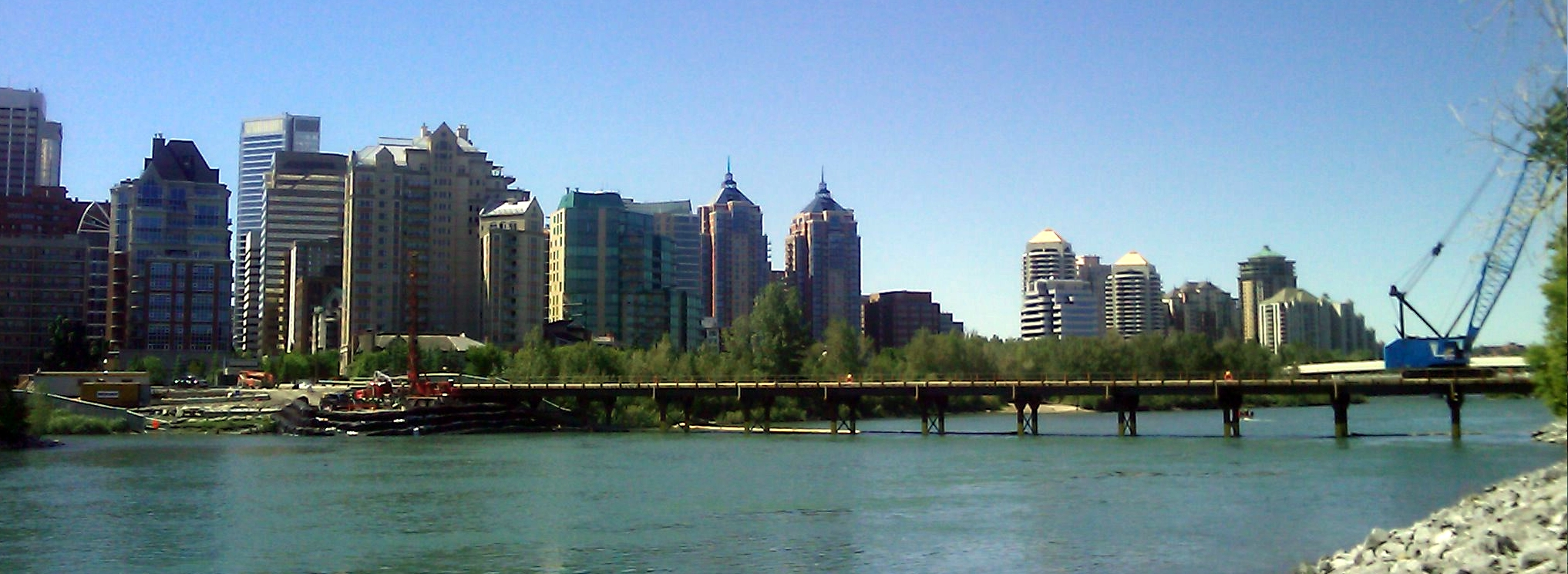
Temporary bridge completed in June 2010

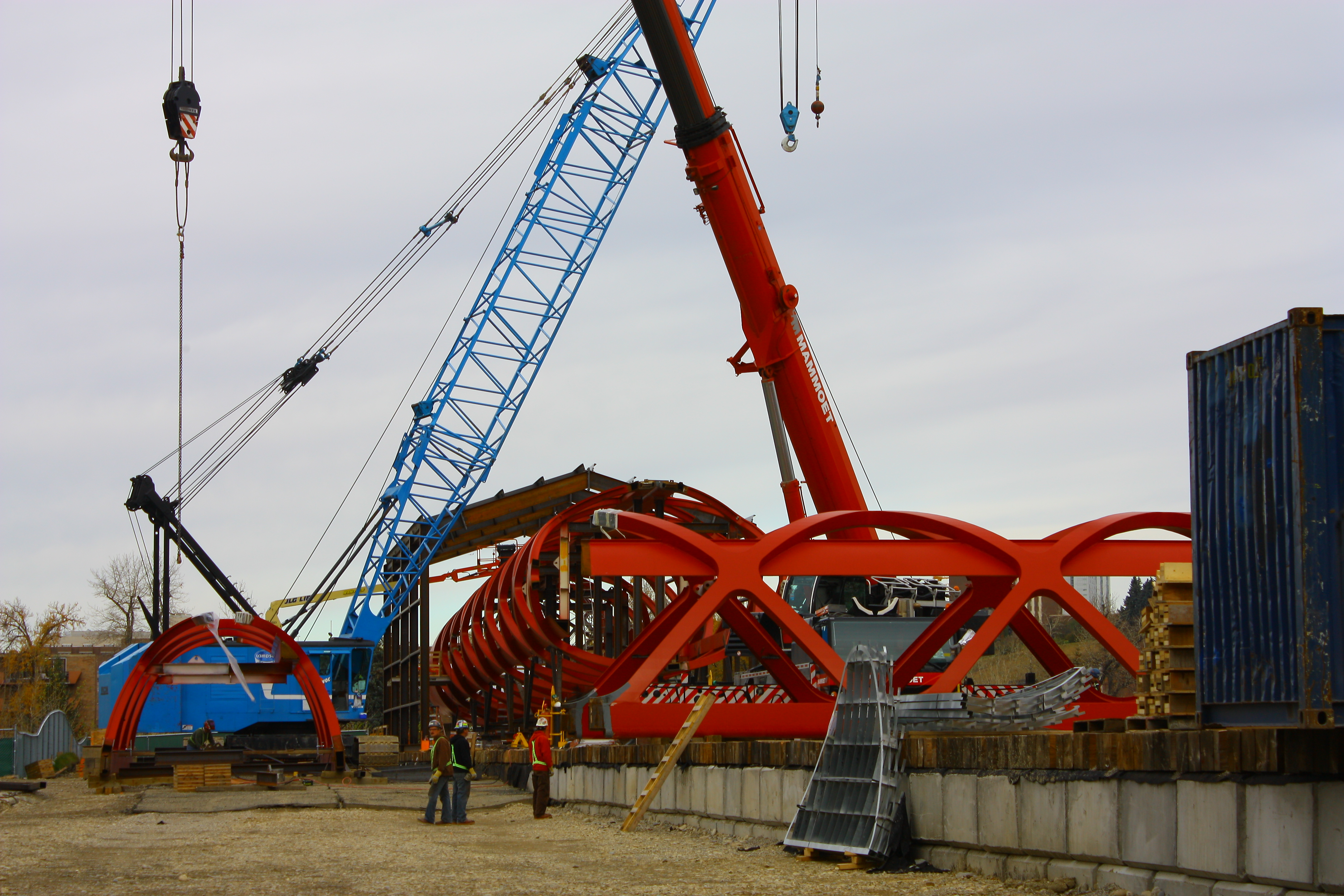
Assembly of the segments in Calgary

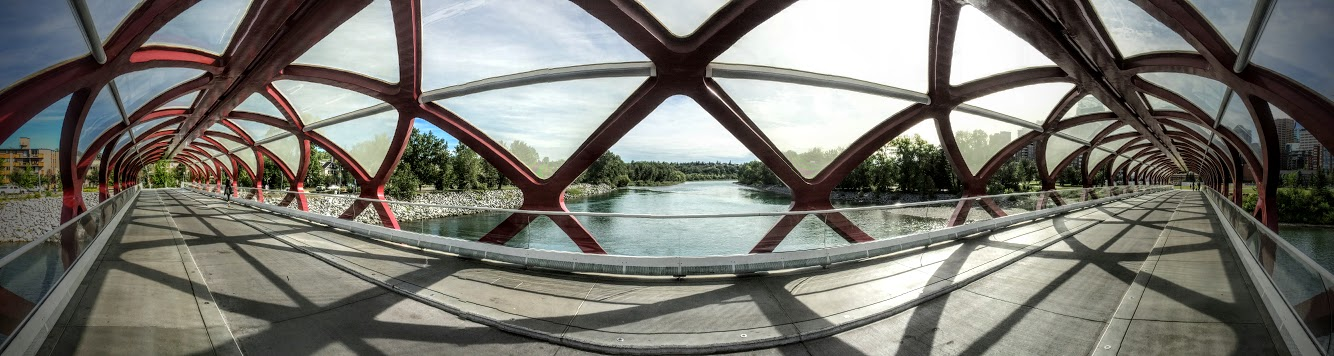

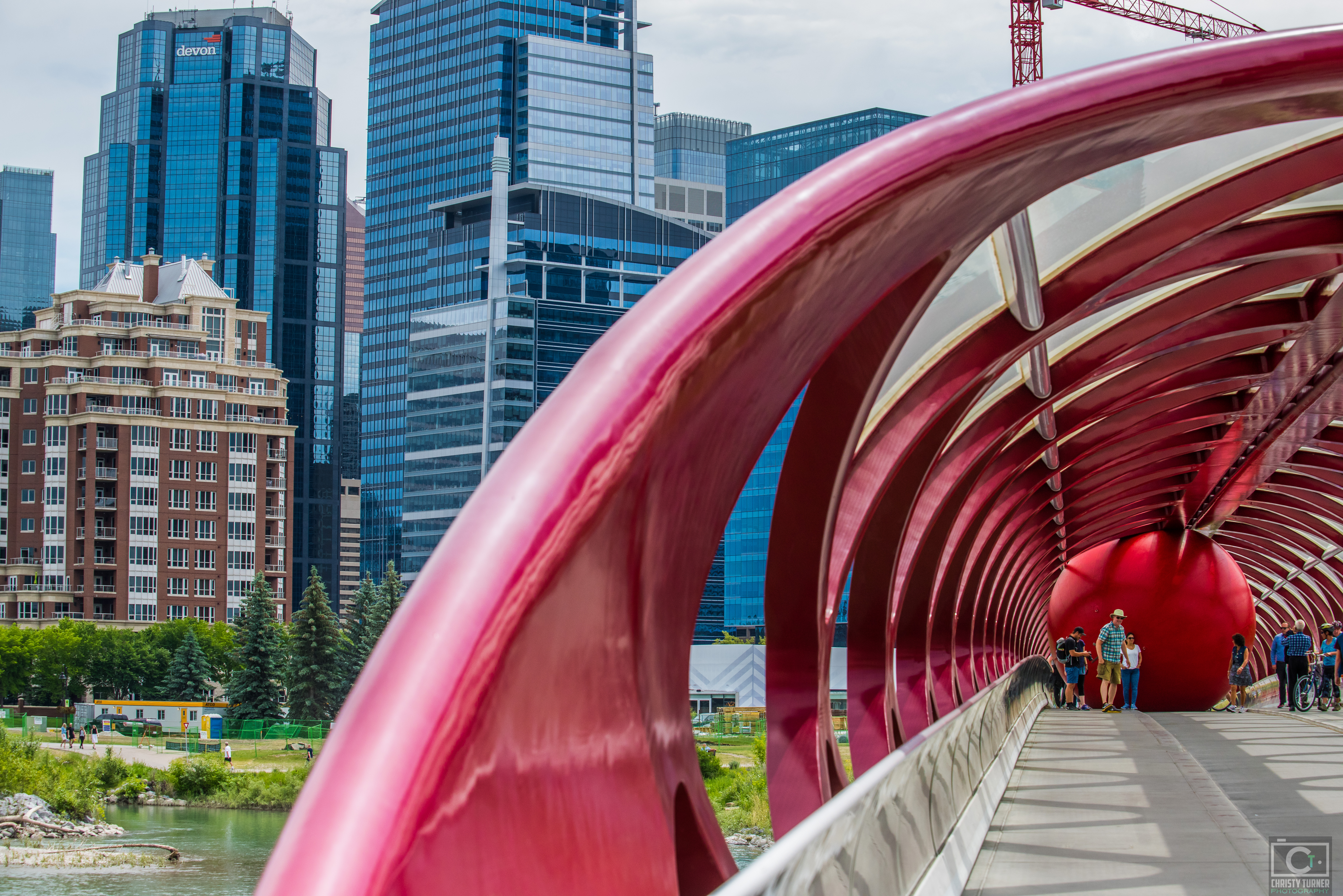
The Red Ball Project installed inside the Calgary Peace Bridge June 26, 2017

== Criticism ==
The Peace Bridge has drawn much criticism from the public, namely:

- There are three other pedestrian bridges 275m west, 400m west, and 900m east, from its location. However, the Peace Bridge is the only bridge, in Calgary, to provide dedicated bicycle lanes crossing the Bow River.
- The design was single-sourced.
- The design was awarded to a foreign firm.
- The bridge crosses to the north bank of the Bow River, but does not extend over a busy arterial road (Memorial Drive)
- The final cost is projected to be over $30,400 per square metre.
  - Some journalists have asserted the Peace Bridge has a lower cost per area than similar-length pedestrian/cycle bridges.
  - Other indicators place the Peace Bridge amongst the most expensive bridges in cost per metre length at roughly €114,000 (2010 equivalent); it was almost 10 times the $3 million cost of the Pedro e Inês bridge built in 2007 which spans 180 meters (590 ft).

The bridge bears some similarity to the Hans Wilsdorf Bridge in Geneva, designed by the architectural firm of Brodbek-Roulet.

== See also ==
- List of bridges in Calgary
- List of bridges in Canada
