= Triftsee =

Lake in Gadmen in the canton of Bern, Switzerland

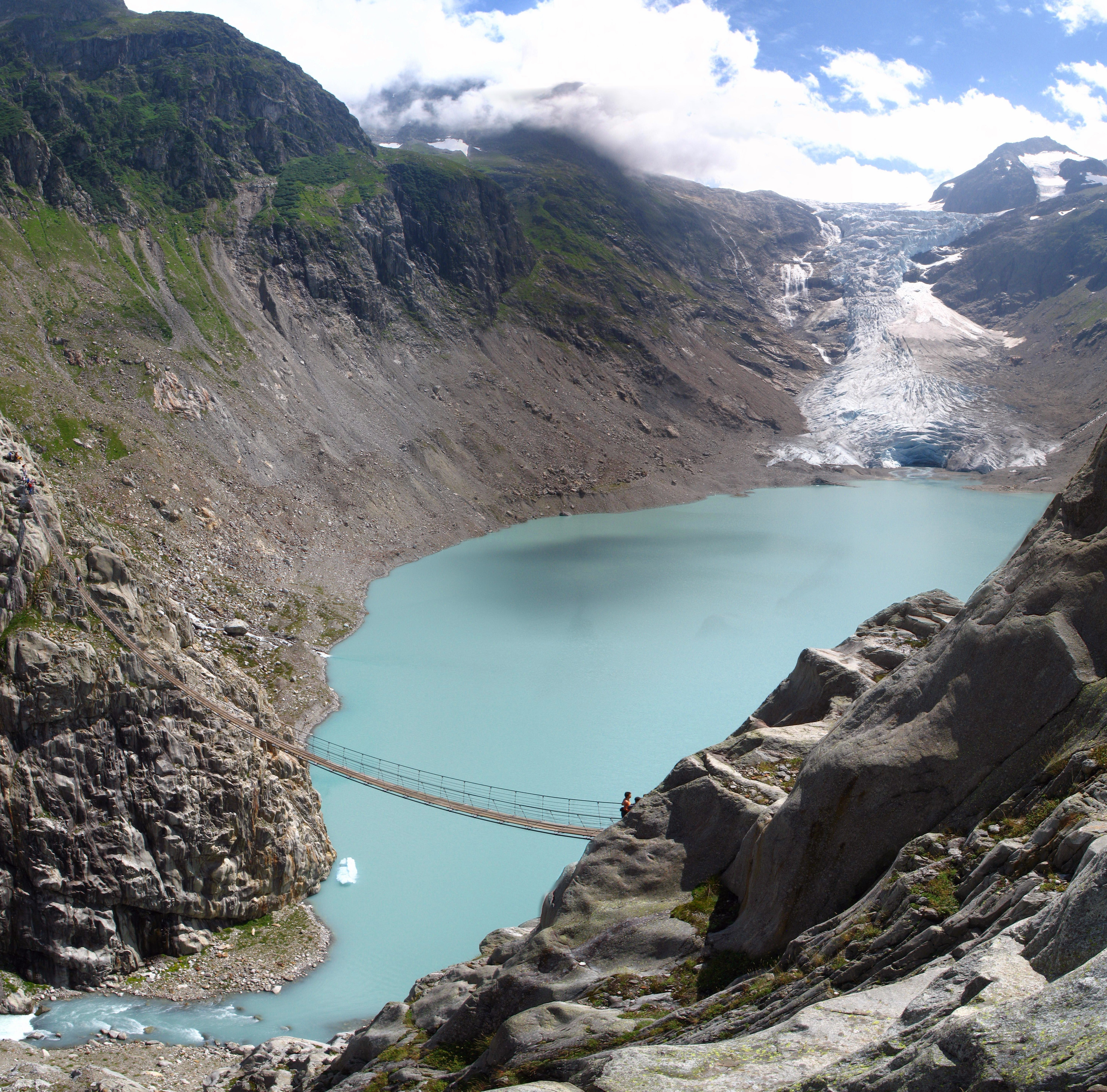
- Triftsee, created by the retreat of the Trift Glacier

- Location within Canton of Bern Location within Switzerland Location within Alps
- Interactive map of Triftsee
- Location: Canton of Bern
- Coordinates: 46.6904°N 8.3591°E
- Basin countries: Switzerland
- Surface area: 28.7 ha (71 acres)
- Surface elevation: 1,640 m (5,380 ft)

The Triftsee is a proglacial lake below the Trift Glacier in Gadmen, in the canton of Bern, Switzerland. It began forming in the late 1990s as the glacier retreated and expanded significantly after 2001. The site has since become the focus of hydropower development plans and environmental debates.

== History ==
Since 1998, a proglacial lake began developing around the tongue of the Trift Glacier as a result of its marked retreat in the previous decade. In 2000 a marginal lake on the glacier’s right side merged with the main basin, and by 2001 depth soundings carried out by scientists at the Laboratory of Hydraulics, Hydrology and Glaciology (VAW) at ETH Zurich estimated the lake to be about 1 km long, up to 50 m deep, and capable of holding around 6 million cubic metres of water. The scientists also identified potential hazards, including waves caused by avalanches or icefalls entering the lake, temporary blockages from floating ice, and sudden outflows that could result in flooding downstream.

Monitoring results from 2004/05 showed that most of the 91 glaciers measured in Switzerland continued to retreat, with the Trift Glacier recording the largest loss. It receded by 216 metres, significantly more than the next largest retreat of 66 metres at the Great Aletsch Glacier. This rapid reduction was attributed to the glacier tongue being surrounded by the proglacial lake, which accelerated melting. In the preceding year, 2003/04, the Trift Glacier had also shown the greatest retreat, with a measured reduction of 134 metres.

The Kraftwerke Oberhasli (KWO) proposal involves building a 170-metre dam at an estimated cost of 400–500 million Swiss francs, below the Trift Glacier. The reservoir would submerge the proglacial lake and glacier forefield. At the end of 2022, the Bern cantonal government created the structural plan requirements for the project and approved the concession extension for submission to the Grand Council. In December 2023, environmental organisations lodged a complaint with the Bern Administrative Court contesting the concession for the dam.

== See also ==
- List of mountain lakes of Switzerland
- Trift Bridge
