= Viaduc de la Jonction =

Swiss Viaduct

Coordinates: 46.2012°N 6.1209°E

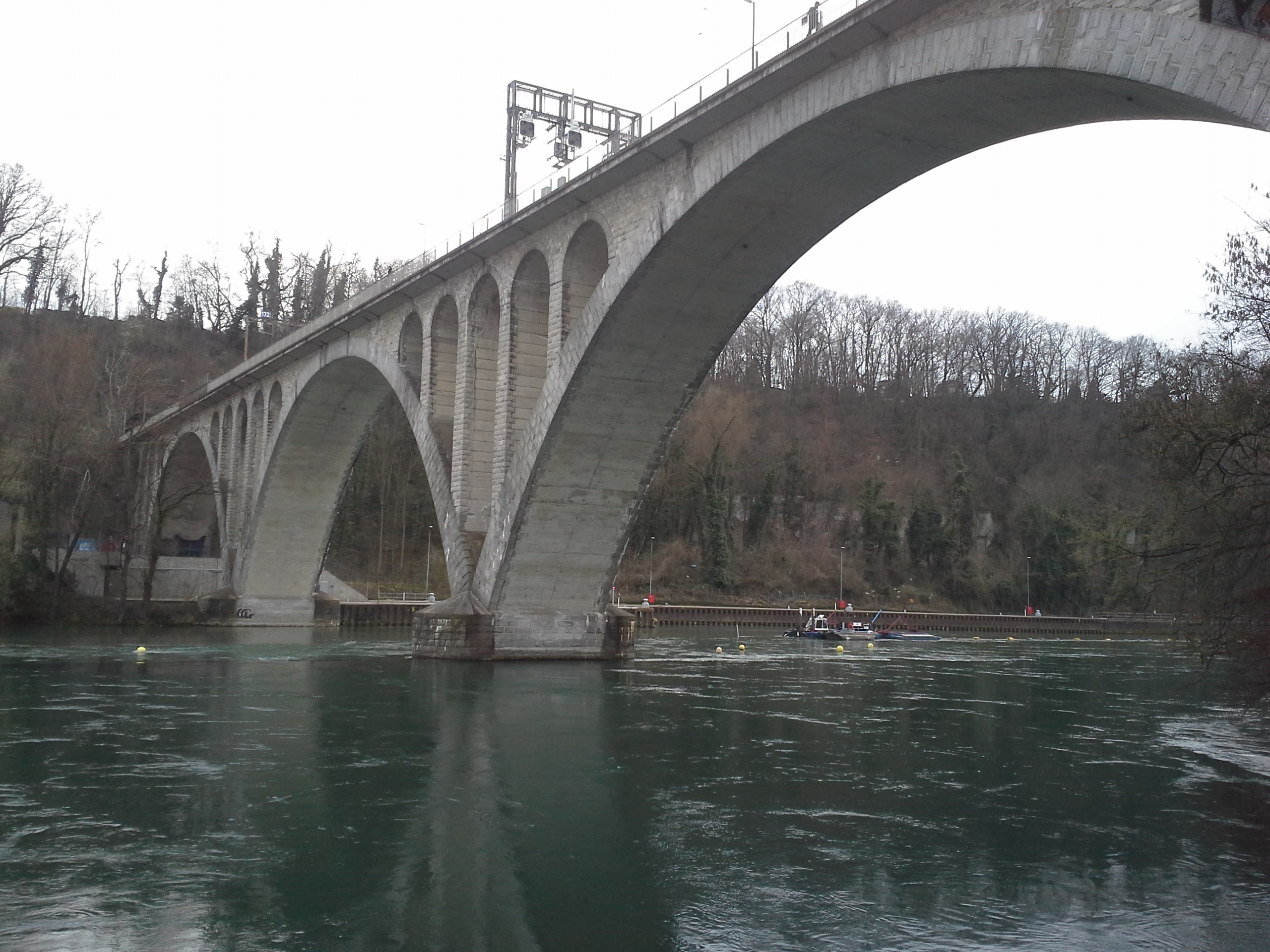
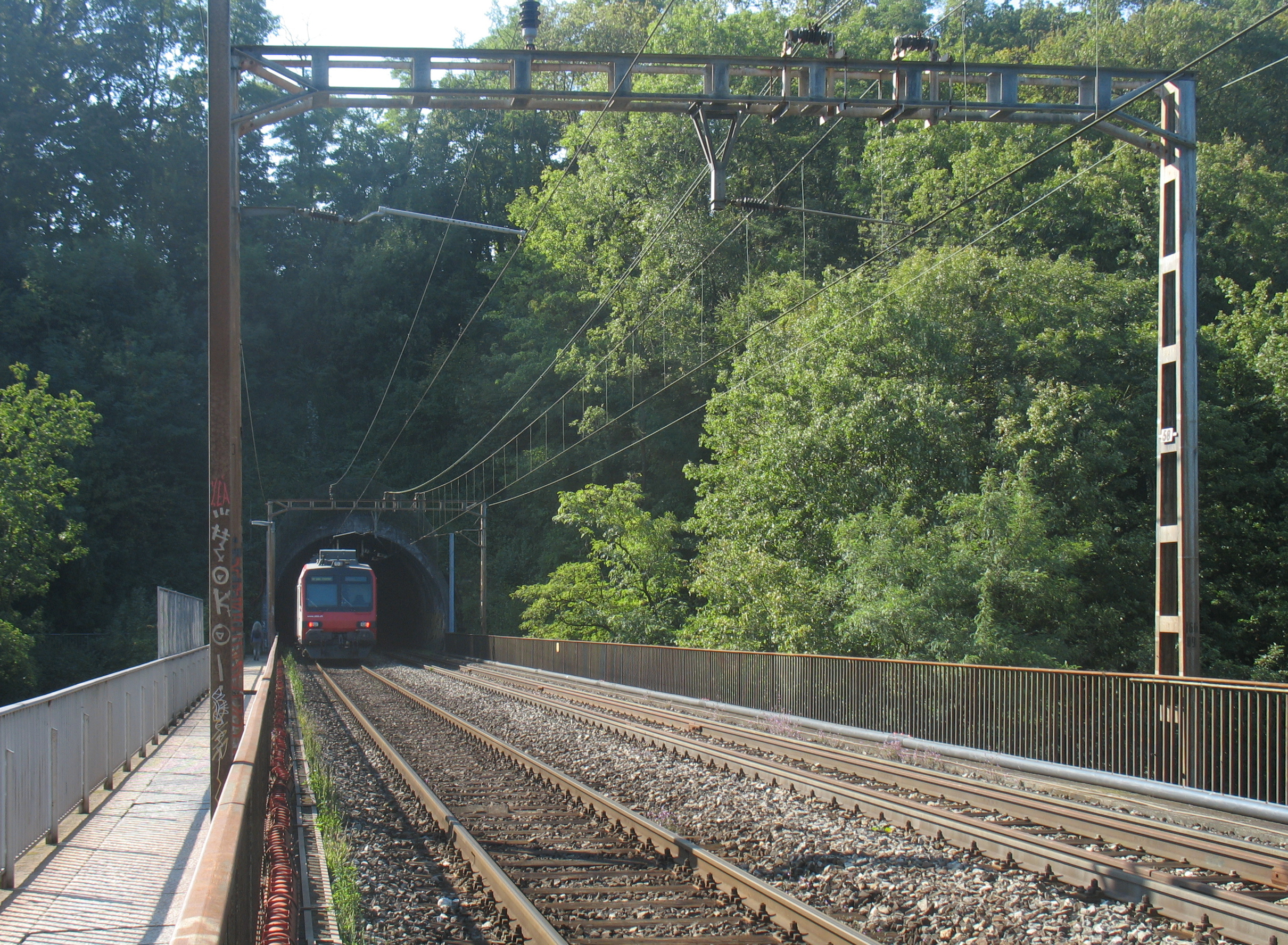

The Viaduc de la Jonction (Viaduct of the Junction) is a rail viaduct in Geneva, Switzerland. It was completed in 1945.

It is located above the confluence of the rivers Rhône & Arve, locally known as "la Jonction" (the Junction), from which it gets its name. The nearby district of La Jonction also gets its name from the confluence.

It carries two railway tracks and a footpath over the confluence. It carried only freight trains until Lancy-Pont-Rouge railway station was opened in 2002, but is an integral part of the CEVA crossrail project.
