= Glion Tunnel =

Vehicular tunnel in Montreux, Switzerland

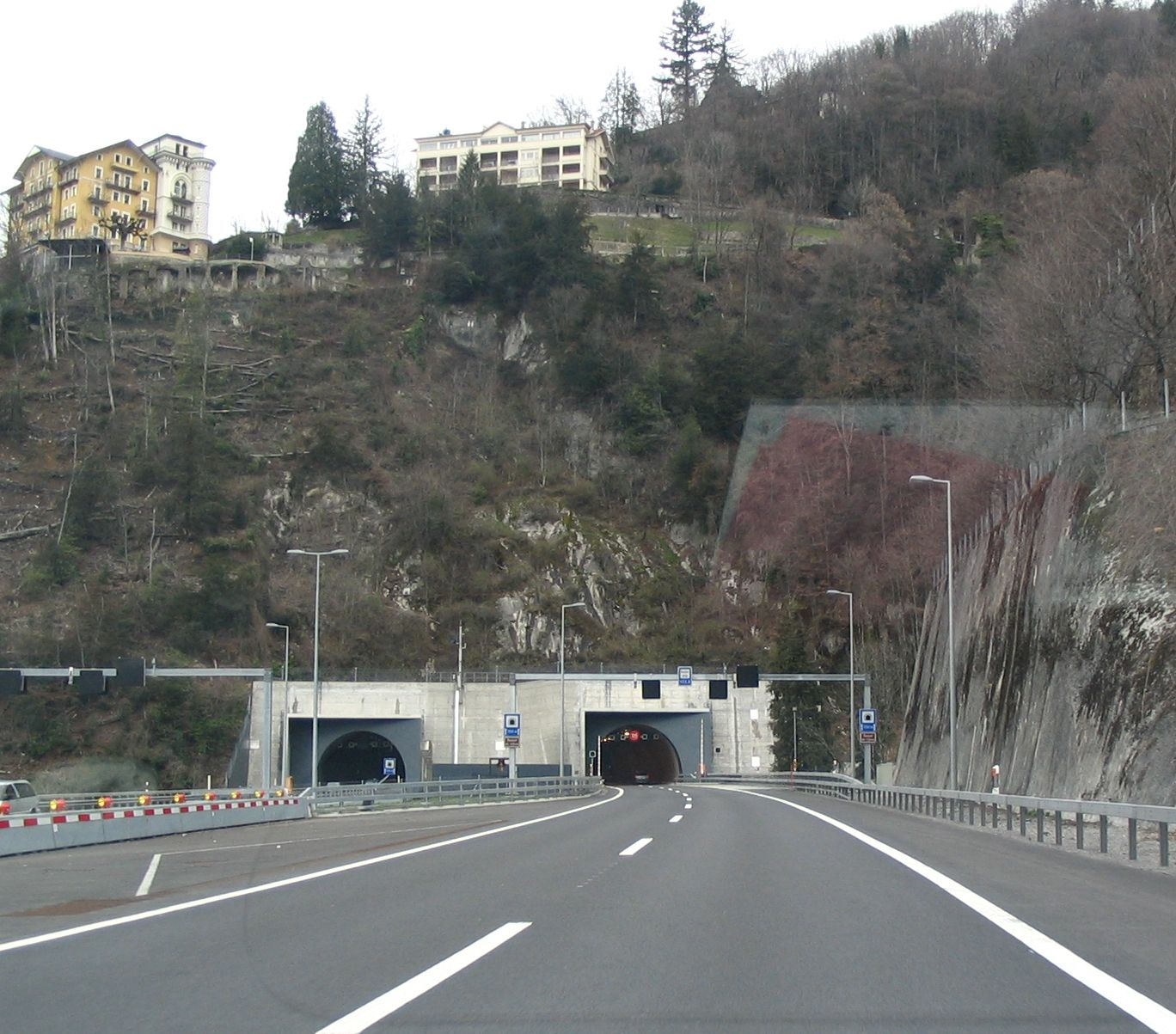
- Glion tunnel east entrance

Overview
- Location: Glion, Montreux, Vaud, Switzerland
- Coordinates: 46°25′26.09″N 6°55′50.13″E
- Status: Active
- Route: A9 motorway

Operation
- Opened: 1970
- Character: road

Technical
- Length: 1,350 metres (4,430 ft)

The Glion Tunnel is a two-gallery vehicular tunnel running underneath Montreux in Switzerland. It carries autoroute A9, which links the Vaud canton to the Valais, and was placed in service in November 1970. The tunnel is 1,350 metres (4,430 ft) long, 9 metres (30 ft) wide and 7.5 metres (25 ft) high.

Between 1970 and 2000, traffic through the tunnel increased from 8,800 vehicles per day to 50,000, with 80,000 vehicles per day at times.

During 2004-2005 the tunnels were renovated to bring them into conformity with the recommendations of the Tunnel Task Force, whose report was published in May 2000. The old tunnels were dark and did not conform to modern safety standards. Work was performed on one tunnel at a time, with traffic diverted through the other gallery. The construction resulted in major delays.
