= Trift Bridge =

Footbridge in the Swiss Alps

Coordinates: 46.6942°N 8.3575°E

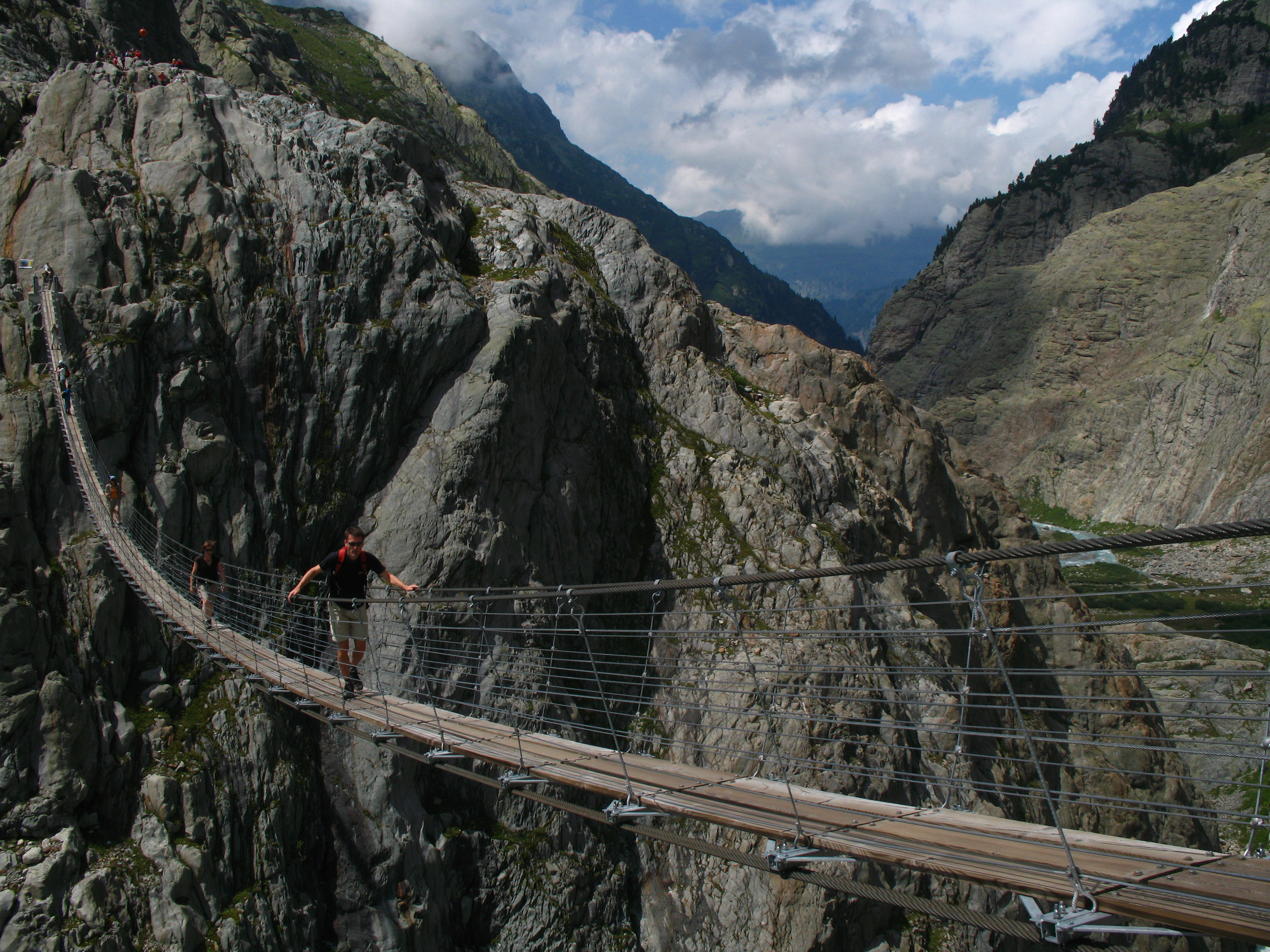
The span of the old Trift Bridge

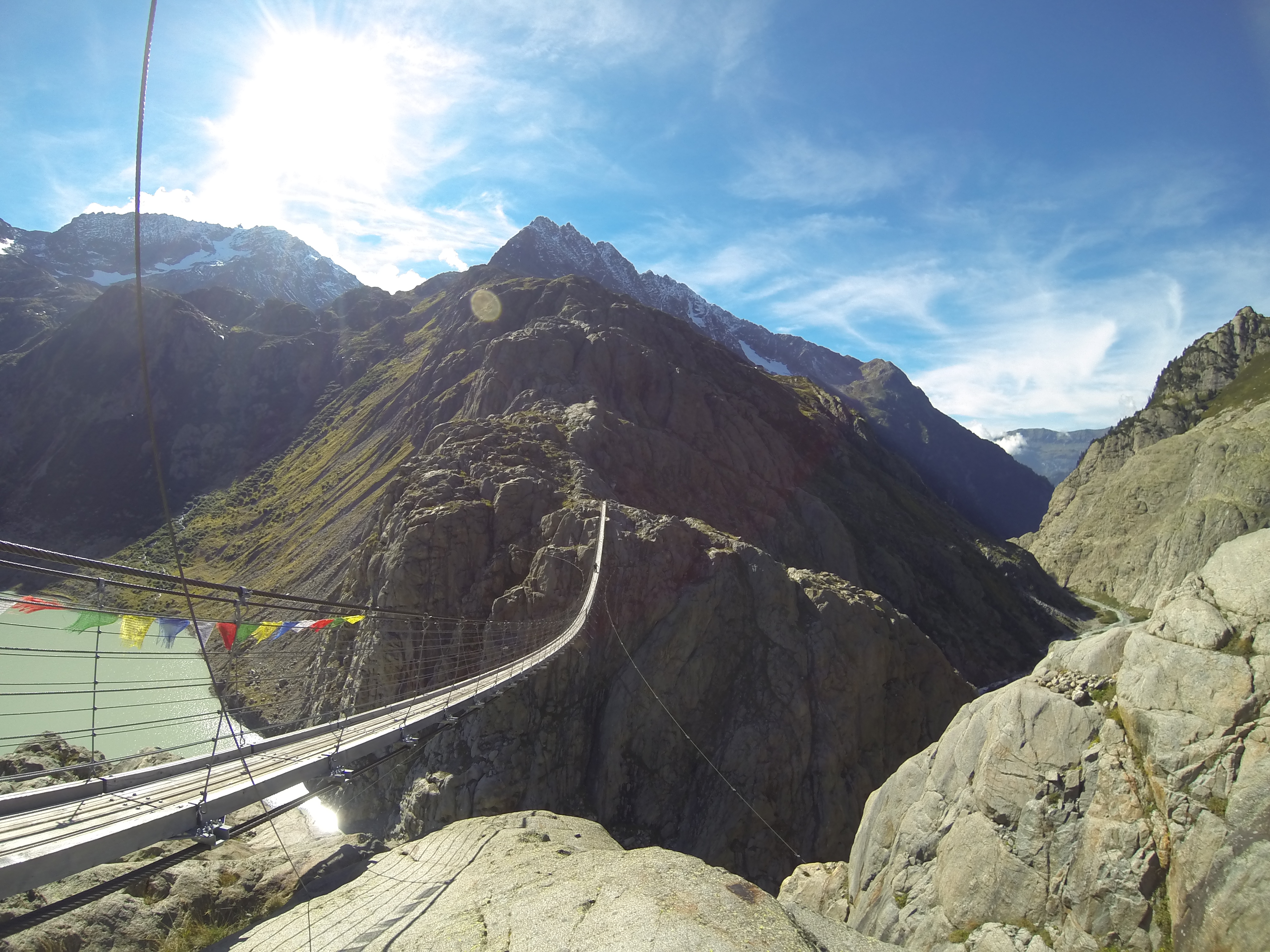
The new Trift Bridge.

The Trift Bridge (German: Triftbrücke) is a pedestrian-only suspension bridge in the Swiss Alps, located above the Triftsee near Gadmen, Switzerland. Originally built in 2004 and replaced in 2009 due to glacial retreat, the bridge spans the lake formed by meltwater from the Trift Glacier. It is considered one of the longest and highest pedestrian suspension bridges in the Alps, and has become a well-known hiking destination in the region.

Reaching the bridge involves taking a cable car, followed by a roughly 1.5-hour uphill hike.

== History ==
The Trift Bridge was constructed in response to the retreat of the Trift Glacier, which had previously provided a natural crossing to the Trift Hut. As the glacier receded, it became unsafe to cross on foot, so a suspension bridge was built in 2004 to restore access. Meltwater from the retreating glacier formed the lake now known as Triftsee, located beneath the bridge.

== Design and construction ==
The first Trift Bridge was built in 2004 after the retreating glacier cut off the original access path to the Trift Hut. The structure was based on simple suspension bridge designs used in Nepal. A second bridge was built for greater safety and accessibility, and opened on 12 June 2009.

The replacement bridge spans approximately 170 metres and is suspended around 100 metres above the Triftsee. It had side planks, a higher and reinforced handrail, and wind bracing for greater stabiliy. Construction was completed over a six-week period.

Parts of the original 2004 Trift Bridge were later reused for the Salbitbrücke, a high-alpine pedestrian bridge in the canton of Uri.

== See also ==
- Arouca 516
- Charles Kuonen Suspension Bridge
- Salbitbrücke
- Simple suspension bridge
