= A9 motorway (Switzerland) =

Motorway in Switzerland

Coordinates: 46.425833°N 6.929884°E

A9

- Location of the A9 in Switzerland

Route information
- Length: 230 km (140 mi)

Major junctions
- From: French border
- To: Italian border

Location
- Country: Switzerland

Highway system
- Transport in Switzerland; Motorways

The A9 motorway, a motorway in western Switzerland, is a divided highway connecting from Ballaigues (in northwest) to southwestern Switzerland. It is part of the National Road N9.

It is double-tracked as a divided highway (directionally separated) in most sections. The N9/A9 runs from Ballaigues on the French border via Vevey, Sion, Brig on the Simplon Pass up to Gondo on the Italian border. The line Sierre-Gamsen is still under construction and not passable. The construction of this 31-kilometre (19 mi) line will cost 2270 million CHF: it is funded at 4% by the Canton of Valais and at 96% by the Swiss federal government.

== Major engineering works ==
The following are major construction projects underway along A9:

- Sierre-Gamsen-VS line

== Junction list ==
Junctions

	Hauptstrasse N9
(1)	Ballaigues
(2)	Les Clées
(3)	Orbe
(4)	Junction Essert-Pittet A1
(5)	Chavornay
	(Rest area) Bavois
(6)	La Sarraz
(7)	Cossonay
(8)	Junction Villars-Ste-Croix A1
(9)	Lausanne-Blécherette
(10)	Lausanne-Vennes
	Belmont (375 m)
(11)	Belmont
(12)	Junction La Croix
	Lavaux
	Chauderon (210 m)
	Criblette (275 m)
	Flonzaley (715 m)
(13)	Chexbres
(14)	Junction La Veyre A12
(15)	Vevey
(15)	Montreux
	(Rest area) Le Pertit
	Glion (1345 m)
(16)	Villeneuve
	Le Chablais
(17)	Aigle
(18)	Saint-Triphon
(19)	Bex
	Arzillier (410 m)
(20)	Saint-Maurice
	(Rest area) Cime de l'Est
	Grand-St-Bernard
(21)	Martigny-Fully
(22)	Junction Grand Saint-Bernard
	(Rest area) Pierre-Avoi
(23)	Saxon
(24)	Riddes
	(Rest area) Ardon
(25)	Conthey
	(Rest area) Aproz
(26)	Sion-Ouest
(27)	Sion-Est
	(Rest area) Rue des Maréches
(28)	Sierre-Ouest
	Ancien-Sierre - Plantzette (580 m)
	Géronde (370 m)
(29)	Sierre-Est
	Autobahn end
	Gorwetsch (1705 m) - in work (2016)
	Ermitage (380 m) - in work (2016)
	Pfyngut (2115 m) - in work (2016)
	Leuk, Susten-West - in work (2016)
	Susten (2070 m) - in work (2016)
	Leuk, Susten-Ost - in work (2016)
	Turtmann (1150 m) - in work (2016)
	Flugplatz Turtmann (190 m) - in work (2016)
	Steg, Gampel-West - in work (2016)
	Riedberg (510 m) - in work (2016)
	Steg, Gampel-Ost - in work (2016)
	Raron - in work (2016)
	Raron (920 m) - in work (2016)
	Autobahn end
	Visp-West - westbound - eastbound in work (2023)
	Schwarzer Graben (2900 m)
	Vispertal
	Staldbach-Grosshus (4290 m)
	Visp-Ost
	Gamsen (1021 m)
(34)	Junction Brig-Glis
	Gstipf (215 m)
(35)	Junction Brig-Zentrum
(36)	Junction Ried-Brig
	Autobahn end
	Hauptstrasse N9
