= February 6 =

February 6 this year in various calendars
- Friday, 6 February 2026
Akan	Nkyifie
Armenian	21 Mehekani 1475
Aztec	Etzalcualiztli 7, 2 Cuāuhtli
Babylonian	17 Tebetu, 2336 SE
Balinese pawukon	Menga, Kajeng, Jaya, Wage, Urukung, Sukra of Uye, Kala, Erangan, Pandita
Bengali	23 Magh, BS 1432
Chinese	Yin Metal Pig・Neck Mansion; Wood Snake Year, Month 12, Day 19 (Lichun, 12 days until Yushui)
Common Era	6 February 2026 CE
Coptic	29 Tobi, AM 1742
Egyptian	26 Payni, 2774 NE
Ethiopian	29 Ṭer, 2018 Amätä Məhrät
French Republican	Décade II, Octidi de Pluviôse de l'Année 234 de la République
Gregorian	6 February, AD 2026
Hebrew	19 Shevat, AM 5786
Hindu	Hasta・Sukarman; Solar: 24 Māgha, 1947 SE; Lunisolar: Pañcamī, Kṛishna pakṣa of Māgha, 2082 VE; Siddhārthin・5126 KY・1,872,612
Icelandic	Föstudagur, 15 Þorri 2025
Islamic	18 Sha'aban, AH 1447 (using tabular method)
ISO week date	2026-W06-5
Japanese	19 Shiwasu, Reiwa 8 (Risshun, 13 days until Usui)
Julian	24 January, AD 2026 (AM 7534)
Julian day	2461078
Korean	19 Sodal, 4358 DE
Maya	13.0.13.5.15; 13 Pax, 2 Men
Roman	ante diem IX Kalendas Februarias, MMDCCLXXIX AUC
Solar Hijri	17 Bahman, SH 1404
Tibetan	20 rgyal, shing mo sbrul 2152 or 1771 or 999

<<	February					>>
Su	Mo	Tu	We	Th	Fr	Sa
1	2	3	4	5	6	7
8	9	10	11	12	13	14
15	16	17	18	19	20	21
22	23	24	25	26	27	28
2026

February 6 in recent years
2026 (Friday)
2025 (Thursday)
2024 (Tuesday)
2023 (Monday)
2022 (Sunday)
2021 (Saturday)
2020 (Thursday)
2019 (Wednesday)
2018 (Tuesday)
2017 (Monday)

February 6 is the 37th day of the year in the Gregorian calendar; 328 days remain until the end of the year (329 in leap years).

== Events ==
=== Pre-1600 ===
- 337 – Election of Pope Julius I.
- 590 – Hormizd IV, king of the Sasanian Empire, is overthrown and blinded by his brothers-in-law Vistahm and Vinduyih.
- 1579 – The Diocese of Manila is erected by papal bull, with Domingo de Salazar appointed its first bishop.

=== 1601–1900 ===
- 1685 – James II of England and VII of Scotland is proclaimed King upon the death of his brother Charles II.
- 1694 – Dandara dos Palmares, leader of the runaway slaves in Quilombo dos Palmares, Brazil, is captured and commits suicide rather than be returned to a life of slavery.
- 1778 – American Revolutionary War: In Paris the Treaty of Alliance and the Treaty of Amity and Commerce are signed by the United States and France signaling official recognition of the new republic.
- 1778 – New York became the third state to ratify the Articles of Confederation.
- 1788 – Massachusetts becomes the sixth state to ratify the United States Constitution.
- 1806 – Battle of San Domingo: British naval victory against the French in the Caribbean.
- 1819 – The Treaty of Singapore was signed by Sir Thomas Stamford Raffles, Hussein Shah of Johor, and Temenggong Abdul Rahman, and it is now recognised as the founding of modern Singapore.
- 1820 – The first 86 African American immigrants sponsored by the American Colonization Society depart New York to start a settlement in present-day Liberia.
- 1833 – Otto becomes the first modern King of Greece.
- 1840 – Signing of the Treaty of Waitangi, establishing New Zealand as a British colony.
- 1843 – The first minstrel show in the United States, The Virginia Minstrels, opens (Bowery Amphitheatre in New York City).
- 1851 – The largest Australian bushfires in a populous region in recorded history take place in the state of Victoria.
- 1862 – American Civil War: Forces under the command of Ulysses S. Grant and Andrew H. Foote give the Union its first victory of the war, capturing Fort Henry, Tennessee in the Battle of Fort Henry.
- 1865 – The municipal administration of Finland is established.
- 1899 – Spanish–American War: The Treaty of Paris, a peace treaty between the United States and Spain, is ratified by the United States Senate.
- 1900 – The Permanent Court of Arbitration, an international arbitration court at The Hague, is created when the Senate of the Netherlands ratifies an 1899 peace conference decree.

=== 1901–present ===
- 1918 – British women over the age of 30 who meet minimum property qualifications, get the right to vote when Representation of the People Act 1918 is passed by Parliament.
- 1919 – The five-day Seattle General Strike begins, as more than 65,000 workers in the city of Seattle, Washington, walk off the job.
- 1922 – The Washington Naval Treaty is signed in Washington, D.C., limiting the naval armaments of United States, Britain, Japan, France, and Italy.
- 1934 – Far-right leagues rally in front of the Palais Bourbon in an attempted coup against the French Third Republic, creating a political crisis in France.
- 1944 – World War II: The Great Raids Against Helsinki begins.
- 1951 – The Canadian Army enters combat in the Korean War.
- 1951 – The Broker, a Pennsylvania Railroad passenger train derails near Woodbridge Township, New Jersey. The accident kills 85 people and injures over 500 more. The wreck is one of the worst rail disasters in American history.
- 1952 – Elizabeth II becomes Queen of the United Kingdom and her other Realms and Territories and Head of the Commonwealth upon the death of her father, George VI. At the exact moment of succession, she was in a tree house at the Treetops Hotel in Kenya.
- 1958 – Eight Manchester United F.C. players and 15 other passengers are killed in the Munich air disaster.
- 1959 – Jack Kilby of Texas Instruments files the first patent for an integrated circuit.
- 1959 – At Cape Canaveral, Florida, the first successful test firing of a Titan intercontinental ballistic missile is accomplished.
- 1973 – The M_{s} 7.6 Luhuo earthquake strikes Sichuan Province, causing widespread destruction and killing at least 2,199 people.
- 1976 – In testimony before a United States Senate subcommittee, Lockheed Corporation president Carl Kotchian admits that the company had paid out approximately $3 million in bribes to the office of Japanese Prime Minister Kakuei Tanaka.
- 1978 – The Blizzard of 1978, one of the worst Nor'easters in New England history, hit the region, with sustained winds of 65 mph and snowfall of four inches an hour.
- 1981 – The National Resistance Army of Uganda launches an attack on a Ugandan Army installation in the central Mubende District to begin the Ugandan Bush War.
- 1987 – Justice Mary Gaudron becomes the first woman to be appointed to the High Court of Australia.
- 1989 – The Round Table Talks start in Poland, thus marking the beginning of the overthrow of communism in Eastern Europe.
- 1996 – Willamette Valley Flood: Floods in the Willamette Valley of Oregon, United States, causes over US$500 million in property damage throughout the Pacific Northwest.
- 1996 – Birgenair Flight 301 crashed off the coast of the Dominican Republic, killing all 189 people on board. This is the deadliest aviation accident involving a Boeing 757.
- 1998 – Washington National Airport is renamed Ronald Reagan National Airport.
- 2000 – Second Chechen War: Russia captures Grozny, Chechnya, forcing the separatist Chechen Republic of Ichkeria government into exile.
- 2006 – Stephen Harper becomes Prime Minister of Canada.
- 2012 – A magnitude 6.7 earthquake hits the central Philippine island of Negros, leaving 112 people dead.
- 2016 – An earthquake of magnitude 6.6 strikes southern Taiwan, killing 117 people.
- 2018 – SpaceX's Falcon Heavy, a super heavy launch vehicle, makes its maiden flight.
- 2021 – U.S. Secretary of State Antony Blinken suspends agreements with Guatemala, El Salvador and Honduras to send asylum seekers back to their home countries.
- 2023 – Two earthquakes measuring M_{ww} 7.8 and 7.5 struck near the border between Turkey and Syria with a maximum Mercalli intensity of XII (Extreme). The earthquakes resulted in numerous aftershocks and a death toll of 57,658 people.

== Births ==
=== Pre-1600 ===
- 885 – Emperor Daigo of Japan (died 930)
- 1402 – Louis I, Landgrave of Hesse, Landgrave of Hesse (died 1458)
- 1452 – Joanna, Princess of Portugal (died 1490)
- 1453 – Girolamo Benivieni, Florentine poet (died 1542)
- 1465 – Scipione del Ferro, Italian mathematician and theorist (died 1526)
- 1536 – Sassa Narimasa, Japanese samurai (died 1588)
- 1577 – Beatrice Cenci, Italian murderer (died 1599)
- 1582 – Mario Bettinus, Italian mathematician, astronomer, and philosopher (died 1657)

=== 1601–1900 ===
- 1605 – Bernard of Corleone, Italian saint (died 1667)
- 1608 – António Vieira, Portuguese priest and philosopher (died 1697)
- 1611 – Chongzhen Emperor of China (died 1644)
- 1612 – Antoine Arnauld, French mathematician, theologian, and philosopher (died 1694)
- 1643 – Johann Kasimir Kolbe von Wartenberg, Prussian politician, 1st Minister President of Prussia (died 1712)
- 1649 – Augusta Marie of Holstein-Gottorp, German noblewoman (died 1728)
- 1664 – Mustafa II, Ottoman sultan (died 1703)
- 1665 – Anne, Queen of Great Britain, Queen of England, Scotland and Ireland (died 1714)
- 1695 – Nicolaus II Bernoulli, Swiss-Russian mathematician and theorist (died 1726)
- 1719 – Alberto Pullicino, Maltese painter (died 1759)
- 1726 – Patrick Russell, Scottish surgeon and zoologist (died 1805)
- 1732 – Charles Lee, English-American general (died 1782)
- 1736 – Franz Xaver Messerschmidt, German-Austrian sculptor (died 1783)
- 1744 – Pierre-Joseph Desault, French anatomist and surgeon (died 1795)
- 1748 – Adam Weishaupt, German philosopher and academic, founded the Illuminati (died 1830)
- 1753 – Évariste de Parny, French poet and author (died 1814)
- 1756 – Aaron Burr, American colonel and politician, 3rd Vice President of the United States (died 1836)
- 1758 – Julian Ursyn Niemcewicz, Belarusian-Polish poet, playwright, and politician (died 1841)
- 1769 – Ludwig von Wallmoden-Gimborn, Austrian general (died 1862)
- 1772 – George Murray, Scottish general and politician, Secretary of State for War and the Colonies (died 1830)
- 1778 – Ugo Foscolo, Italian author and poet (died 1827)
- 1781 – John Keane, 1st Baron Keane, Irish general and politician, Governor of Saint Lucia (died 1844)
- 1796 – John Stevens Henslow, English botanist and geologist (died 1861)
- 1797 – Joseph von Radowitz, Prussian general and politician, Foreign Minister of Prussia (died 1853)
- 1799 – Imre Frivaldszky, Hungarian botanist and entomologist (died 1870)
- 1800 – Achille Devéria, French painter and lithographer (died 1857)
- 1802 – Charles Wheatstone, English-French physicist and cryptographer (died 1875)
- 1811 – Henry Liddell, English priest, author, and academic (died 1898)
- 1814 – Auguste Chapdelaine, French missionary and saint (died 1856)
- 1818 – William M. Evarts, American lawyer and politician, 27th United States Secretary of State (died 1901)
- 1820 – Thomas C. Durant, American railroad tycoon (died 1885)
- 1829 – Joseph Auguste Émile Vaudremer, French architect, designed the La Santé Prison and Saint-Pierre-de-Montrouge (died 1914)
- 1832 – John Brown Gordon, American general and politician, 53rd Governor of Georgia (died 1904)
- 1833 – José María de Pereda, Spanish author and academic (died 1906)
- 1833 – J. E. B. Stuart, American general (died 1864)
- 1834 – Edwin Klebs, German-Swiss pathologist and academic (died 1913)
- 1834 – Ema Pukšec, Croatian-German soprano (died 1889)
- 1834 – Wilhelm von Scherff, German general and author (died 1911)
- 1838 – Henry Irving, English actor and manager (died 1905)
- 1838 – Israel Meir Kagan, Lithuanian-Polish rabbi and author (died 1933)
- 1839 – Eduard Hitzig, German neurologist and psychiatrist (died 1907)
- 1842 – Alexandre Ribot, French academic and politician, Prime Minister of France (died 1923)
- 1843 – Inoue Kowashi, Japanese scholar and politician (died 1895)
- 1843 – Frederic William Henry Myers, English poet and philologist, co-founded the Society for Psychical Research (died 1901)
- 1845 – Isidor Straus, German-American businessman and politician (died 1912)
- 1847 – Henry Janeway Hardenbergh, American architect, designed the Plaza Hotel (died 1918)
- 1852 – C. Lloyd Morgan, English zoologist and psychologist (died 1936)
- 1852 – Vasily Safonov, Russian pianist, composer, and conductor (died 1918)
- 1861 – Nikolay Zelinsky, Russian chemist and academic (died 1953)
- 1864 – John Henry Mackay, Scottish-German philosopher and author (died 1933)
- 1866 – Karl Sapper, German linguist and explorer (died 1945)
- 1872 – Robert Maillart, Swiss engineer, designed the Salginatobel Bridge and Schwandbach Bridge (died 1940)
- 1874 – Bhaktisiddhanta Sarasvati Thakura, Indian religious leader, founded the Gaudiya Math (died 1937)
- 1875 – Leonid Gobyato, Russian general (died 1915)
- 1876 – Henry Blogg, English fisherman and sailor (died 1954)
- 1879 – Othon Friesz, French painter (died 1949)
- 1879 – Magnús Guðmundsson, Icelandic lawyer and politician, 3rd Prime Minister of Iceland (died 1937)
- 1879 – Edwin Samuel Montagu, English politician, Chancellor of the Duchy of Lancaster (died 1924)
- 1879 – Carl Ramsauer, German physicist and author (died 1955)
- 1880 – Nishinoumi Kajirō II, Japanese sumo wrestler, the 25th Yokozuna (died 1931)
- 1884 – Marcel Cohen, French linguist and scholar (died 1974)
- 1887 – Josef Frings, German cardinal (died 1978)
- 1888 – Nell W. Walker, American politician and banker (died 1962)
- 1890 – Khan Abdul Ghaffar Khan, Pakistani activist and politician (died 1988)
- 1890 – James McGirr, Australian politician, 28th Premier of New South Wales (died 1957)
- 1892 – Maximilian Fretter-Pico, German general (died 1984)
- 1892 – William P. Murphy, American physician and academic, Nobel Prize laureate (died 1987)
- 1893 – Muhammad Zafarullah Khan, Pakistani politician and diplomat, 1st Minister of Foreign Affairs for Pakistan (died 1985)
- 1894 – Eric Partridge, New Zealand-English lexicographer and academic (died 1979)
- 1894 – Kirpal Singh, Indian spiritual master (died 1974)
- 1895 – Robert La Follette Jr., American politician (died 1953)
- 1895 – María Teresa Vera, Cuban singer, guitarist and composer (died 1965)
- 1895 – Babe Ruth, American baseball player and coach (died 1948)
- 1898 – Harry Haywood, American soldier and politician (died 1985)
- 1899 – Ramon Novarro, Mexican-American actor, singer, and director (died 1968)

=== 1901–present ===
- 1901 – Ben Lyon, American actor (died 1979)
- 1902 – George Brunies, American trombonist (died 1974)
- 1902 – Zdenka Ziková, Czech opera singer (died 1990)
- 1903 – Claudio Arrau, Chilean pianist and composer (died 1991)
- 1905 – Władysław Gomułka, Polish politician (died 1982)
- 1905 – Jan Werich, Czech actor and playwright (died 1980)
- 1906 – Joseph Schull, Canadian playwright and historian (died 1980)
- 1908 – Geo Bogza, Romanian poet and journalist (died 1993)
- 1908 – Amintore Fanfani, Italian journalist and politician, 32nd Prime Minister of Italy (died 1999)
- 1908 – Edward Lansdale, American general and CIA agent (died 1987)
- 1908 – Michael Maltese, American actor, screenwriter, and composer (died 1981)
- 1910 – Roman Czerniawski, Polish air force officer and spy (died 1985)
- 1910 – Irmgard Keun, German author (died 1982)
- 1910 – Carlos Marcello, Tunisian-American gangster (died 1993)
- 1911 – Ronald Reagan, American actor and politician, 40th President of the United States (died 2004)
- 1912 – Eva Braun, German photographer, mistress and briefly wife of Adolf Hitler (died 1945)
- 1912 – Christopher Hill, English historian and author (died 2003)
- 1913 – Mary Leakey, English-Kenyan archaeologist and anthropologist (died 1996)
- 1914 – Thurl Ravenscroft, American voice actor and singer (died 2005)
- 1915 – Kavi Pradeep, Indian poet and songwriter (died 1998)
- 1916 – John Crank, English mathematician and physicist (died 2006)
- 1917 – Louis-Philippe de Grandpré, Canadian lawyer and jurist (died 2008)
- 1918 – Lothar-Günther Buchheim, German author and painter (died 2007)
- 1919 – Takashi Yanase, Japanese poet and illustrator, created Anpanman (died 2013)
- 1921 – Carl Neumann Degler, American historian and author (died 2014)
- 1921 – Bob Scott, New Zealand rugby player (died 2012)
- 1922 – Patrick Macnee, British-American actor (died 2015)
- 1922 – Denis Norden, English actor, screenwriter, and television host (died 2018)
- 1922 – Haskell Wexler, American director, producer, and cinematographer (died 2015)
- 1923 – Gyula Lóránt, Hungarian footballer and manager (died 1981)
- 1924 – Billy Wright, English footballer and manager (died 1994)
- 1924 – Jin Yong, Hong Kong author and publisher, founded Ming Pao (died 2018)
- 1925 – Pramoedya Ananta Toer, Indonesian novelist and intellectual (died 2006)
- 1927 – Gerard K. O'Neill, American physicist and astronomer (died 1992)
- 1928 – Allan H. Meltzer, American economist and academic (died 2017)
- 1929 – Colin Murdoch, New Zealand pharmacist and veterinarian, invented the tranquilliser gun (died 2008)
- 1929 – Oscar Sambrano Urdaneta, Venezuelan author and critic (died 2011)
- 1929 – Valentin Yanin, Russian historian and author (died 2020)
- 1930 – Jun Kondo, Japanese physicist and academic (died 2022)
- 1931 – Rip Torn, American actor (died 2019)
- 1931 – Fred Trueman, English cricketer (died 2006)
- 1931 – Ricardo Vidal, Filipino cardinal (died 2017)
- 1932 – Camilo Cienfuegos, Cuban soldier and anarchist (died 1959)
- 1932 – François Truffaut, French filmmaker and critic (died 1984)
- 1933 – Leslie Crowther, English comedian, actor, and game show host (died 1996)
- 1936 – Kent Douglas, Canadian ice hockey player and coach (died 2009)
- 1938 – Fred Mifflin, Canadian admiral and politician, 19th Minister of Veterans Affairs (died 2013)
- 1939 – Jean Beaudin, Canadian director and screenwriter (died 2019)
- 1939 – Mike Farrell, American actor and producer
- 1939 – Jair Rodrigues, Brazilian singer (died 2014)
- 1940 – Tom Brokaw, American journalist and author
- 1940 – Petr Hájek, Czech mathematician and academic (died 2016)
- 1940 – Jimmy Tarbuck, English comedian and actor
- 1941 – Stephen Albert, American pianist and composer (died 1992)
- 1941 – Dave Berry, English pop singer
- 1941 – Gigi Perreau, American actress and director
- 1942 – Ahmad-Jabir Ahmadov, Azerbaijani philosopher and academic (died 2021)
- 1942 – Charlie Coles, American basketball player and coach (died 2013)
- 1942 – James Loewen, American sociologist and historian (died 2021)
- 1942 – Tommy Roberts, English fashion designer (died 2012)
- 1943 – Gayle Hunnicutt, American actress (died 2023)
- 1944 – Christine Boutin, French politician, French Minister of Housing and Urban Development
- 1944 – Willie Tee, American singer-songwriter, keyboard player, and producer (died 2007)
- 1945 – Bob Marley, Jamaican singer-songwriter and cultural icon (died 1981)
- 1945 – Michael Tucker, American actor, writer, and producer
- 1946 – Richie Hayward, American drummer and songwriter (died 2010)
- 1946 – Kate McGarrigle, Canadian musician and singer-songwriter (died 2010)
- 1946 – Jim Turner, American captain and politician
- 1947 – Charlie Hickcox, American swimmer (died 2010)
- 1947 – Bill Staines, American singer-songwriter and guitarist (died 2021)
- 1949 – Mike Batt, English singer-songwriter and producer
- 1949 – Manuel Orantes, Spanish tennis player
- 1949 – Jim Sheridan, Irish director, producer, and screenwriter
- 1949 – Mike Anderson, former American football player.
- 1950 – Natalie Cole, American singer (died 2015)
- 1950 – Timothy M. Dolan, American cardinal
- 1950 – Punky Meadows, American rock guitarist and songwriter
- 1951 – Kevin Whately, English actor
- 1952 – Ric Charlesworth, Australian cricketer, coach, and politician
- 1952 – Viktor Giacobbo, Swiss actor, producer, and screenwriter
- 1952 – Ricardo La Volpe, Argentinian footballer, manager, and coach
- 1955 – Avram Grant, Israeli football manager
- 1955 – John Kuester, American basketball player and coach
- 1955 – Michael Pollan, American journalist, author, and academic
- 1955 – Bruno Stolorz, French rugby player and coach
- 1956 – Jerry Marotta, American drummer
- 1957 – Andres Lipstok, Estonian economist and politician, Estonian Minister of Economic Affairs
- 1957 – Robert Townsend, American filmmaker, actor, and comedian
- 1958 – Cecily Adams, American actress and casting director (died 2004)
- 1960 – Jeremy Bowen, Welsh journalist
- 1961 – Cam Cameron, American football player and coach
- 1961 – Alber Elbaz, Israeli fashion designer (died 2021)
- 1961 – Bill Lester, American race car driver
- 1961 – Yury Onufriyenko, Ukrainian-Russian colonel, pilot, and astronaut
- 1962 – Stavros Lambrinidis, Greek lawyer and politician, Minister of Foreign Affairs for Greece
- 1962 – Axl Rose, American singer and songwriter
- 1963 – David Capel, English cricketer (died 2020)
- 1963 – Scott Gordon, American ice hockey player and coach
- 1963 – Debra Granik, American filmmaker
- 1963 – Quentin Letts, English journalist and critic
- 1964 – Laurent Cabannes, French rugby player
- 1964 – Gord Downie, Canadian singer-songwriter and poet (died 2017)
- 1964 – Colin Miller, Australian cricketer and sportscaster
- 1964 – Andrey Zvyagintsev, Russian actor and director
- 1965 – Jan Svěrák, Czech actor, director, and screenwriter
- 1966 – Rick Astley, British pop singer
- 1967 – Anita Cochran, American singer-songwriter, guitarist, and producer
- 1967 – Izumi Sakai, Japanese singer-songwriter (died 2007)
- 1967 – Michelle Thrush, Canadian actress and activist
- 1968 – Adolfo Valencia, Colombian footballer
- 1968 – Akira Yamaoka, Japanese composer and producer
- 1969 – David Hayter, American actor and screenwriter
- 1969 – Masaharu Fukuyama, Japanese singer-songwriter, producer, and actor
- 1969 – Tim Sherwood, English footballer and manager
- 1969 – Bob Wickman, American baseball player
- 1970 – Per Frandsen, Danish footballer and manager
- 1970 – Tim Herron, American golfer
- 1971 – Brad Hogg, Australian cricketer
- 1971 – Carlos Rogers, American basketball player
- 1972 – Stefano Bettarini, Italian footballer
- 1972 – David Binn, American football player
- 1974 – Aljo Bendijo, Filipino journalist
- 1975 – Matt Alber, American singer-songwriter and filmmaker
- 1975 – Chad Allen, American baseball player and coach
- 1975 – Orkut Büyükkökten, Turkish computer scientist and engineer, created Orkut
- 1975 – Tomoko Kawase, Japanese singer-songwriter and producer
- 1976 – Tanja Frieden, Swiss snowboarder and educator
- 1976 – Kim Zmeskal, American gymnast and coach
- 1978 – Yael Naim, French-Israeli singer-songwriter
- 1979 – Dan Bălan, Moldovan singer-songwriter and producer
- 1980 – Kerry Jeremy, Antiguan cricketer
- 1980 – Konnor, American wrestler
- 1980 – Kim Poirier, Canadian actress, singer, and producer
- 1980 – Luke Ravenstahl, American politician, 58th Mayor of Pittsburgh
- 1981 – Ricky Barnes, American golfer
- 1981 – Calum Best, American-English model and actor
- 1981 – Shim Eun-jin, South Korean singer and actress
- 1981 – Alison Haislip, American actress and producer
- 1981 – Jens Lekman, Swedish singer-songwriter and guitarist
- 1982 – Elise Ray, American gymnast
- 1982 – Tank, Taiwanese singer-songwriter
- 1983 – Dimas Delgado, Spanish footballer
- 1983 – S. Sreesanth, Indian cricketer
- 1983 – Jamie Whincup, Australian race car driver
- 1984 – Darren Bent, English international footballer
- 1984 – Piret Järvis, Estonian singer-songwriter and guitarist
- 1984 – Antoine Wright, American basketball player
- 1985 – Fallulah, Danish singer-songwriter
- 1985 – Kris Humphries, American basketball player
- 1986 – Tony Johnson, American mixed martial artist
- 1986 – Yunho, South Korean singer and actor
- 1987 – Pedro Álvarez, Dominican-American baseball player
- 1987 – Travis Wood, American baseball player
- 1988 – Bailey Hanks, American actress, singer, and dancer
- 1989 – Craig Cathcart, Northern Irish footballer
- 1989 – Jonny Flynn, American basketball player
- 1990 – Adam Henrique, Canadian ice hockey player
- 1990 – Jermaine Kearse, American football player
- 1990 – Aida Rybalko, Lithuanian figure skater
- 1991 – Tobias Eisenbauer, Austrian ice dancer
- 1991 – Aleksandar Katai, Serbian footballer
- 1991 – Ida Njåtun, Norwegian speed skater
- 1991 – Eva Wacanno, Dutch tennis player
- 1991 – Fei Yu, Chinese footballer
- 1992 – Víctor Mañón, Mexican footballer
- 1993 – Teresa Scanlan, American beauty pageant titleholder, Miss America 2011
- 1995 – Nyck de Vries, Dutch racing driver
- 1995 – Leon Goretzka, German footballer
- 1995 – Sam McQueen, English footballer
- 1996 – Kevon Looney, American basketball player
- 1998 – Adley Rutschman, American baseball player
- 2000 – Conor Gallagher, English footballer
- 2002 – Ona Huczkowski, Finnish actress

== Deaths ==
=== Pre-1600 ===
- 685 – Hlothhere, king of Kent
- 743 – Hisham ibn Abd al-Malik, Umayyad caliph (born 691)
- 797 – Donnchad Midi, Irish king (born 733)
- 891 – Photios I of Constantinople (born 810)
- 1135 – Elvira of Castile, Queen of Sicily
- 1140 – Thurstan, Archbishop of York
- 1215 – Hōjō Tokimasa, Japanese shikken of the Kamakura bakufu (born 1138)
- 1378 – Joanna of Bourbon (born 1338)
- 1411 – Esau de' Buondelmonti, ruler of Epirus
- 1497 – Johannes Ockeghem, Flemish composer and educator (born 1410)
- 1515 – Aldus Manutius, Italian publisher, founded the Aldine Press (born 1449)
- 1519 – Lorenz von Bibra, Prince-Bishop of the Bishopric of Würzburg (born 1459)
- 1539 – John III, Duke of Cleves (born 1491)
- 1585 – Edmund Plowden, English lawyer and scholar (born 1518)
- 1593 – Jacques Amyot, French author and translator (born 1513)
- 1593 – Emperor Ōgimachi of Japan (born 1517)
- 1597 – Franciscus Patricius, Italian philosopher and scientist (born 1529)

=== 1601–1900 ===
- 1612 – Christopher Clavius, German mathematician and astronomer (born 1538)
- 1617 – Prospero Alpini, Italian physician and botanist (born 1553)
- 1685 – Charles II of England (born 1630)
- 1695 – Ahmed II, Ottoman sultan (born 1642)
- 1740 – Pope Clement XII (born 1652)
- 1775 – William Dowdeswell, English politician, Chancellor of the Exchequer (born 1721)
- 1783 – Capability Brown, English gardener and architect (born 1716)
- 1793 – Carlo Goldoni, Italian-French playwright (born 1707)
- 1804 – Joseph Priestley, English chemist and theologian (born 1733)
- 1833 – Pierre André Latreille, French zoologist and entomologist (born 1762)
- 1834 – Richard Lemon Lander, English explorer (born 1804)
- 1865 – Isabella Beeton, English author of Mrs Beeton's Book of Household Management (born 1836)
- 1899 – Leo von Caprivi, German general and politician, chancellor of Germany (born 1831)

=== 1901–present ===
- 1902 – John Colton, English-Australian politician, 13th Premier of South Australia (born 1823)
- 1908 – Harriet Samuel, English businesswoman and founder of the jewellery retailer H. Samuel (born 1836)
- 1916 – Rubén Darío, Nicaraguan poet, journalist, and diplomat (born 1867)
- 1918 – Gustav Klimt, Austrian painter and illustrator (born 1862)
- 1929 – Maria Christina of Austria, Queen Consort of King Alfonso XII of Spain, Queen Regent of Spain (born 1858)
- 1931 – Motilal Nehru, Indian lawyer and politician, President of the Indian National Congress (born 1861)
- 1932 – John Earle, Australian politician, 22nd Premier of Tasmania (born 1865)
- 1938 – Marianne von Werefkin, Russian-Swiss painter (born 1860)
- 1942 – Jaan Soots, Estonian general and politician, 7th Estonian Minister of War (born 1880)
- 1951 – Gabby Street, American baseball player, coach, and manager (born 1882)
- 1952 – George VI of the United Kingdom (born 1895)
- 1958 – victims of the Munich air disaster
  - Geoff Bent, English footballer (born 1932)
  - Roger Byrne, English footballer (born 1929)
  - Eddie Colman, English footballer (born 1936)
  - Walter Crickmer, English footballer and manager (born 1900)
  - Mark Jones, English footballer (born 1933)
  - David Pegg, English footballer (born 1935)
  - Frank Swift, English footballer and journalist (born 1913)
  - Tommy Taylor, English footballer (born 1932)
- 1963 – Piero Manzoni, Italian painter and sculptor (born 1933)
- 1964 – Emilio Aguinaldo, Filipino general and politician, 1st President of the Philippines (born 1869)
- 1967 – Martine Carol, French actress (born 1920)
- 1971 – Lew "Sneaky Pete" Robinson, drag racer (born 1933)
- 1972 – Julian Steward, American anthropologist (born 1902)
- 1976 – Ritwik Ghatak, Bangladeshi-Indian director and screenwriter (born 1925)
- 1976 – Vince Guaraldi, American singer-songwriter and pianist (born 1928)
- 1981 – Hugo Montenegro, American composer and conductor (born 1925)
- 1982 – Ben Nicholson, British painter (born 1894)
- 1985 – James Hadley Chase, English-Swiss soldier and author (born 1906)
- 1986 – Frederick Coutts, Scottish 8th General of The Salvation Army (born 1899)
- 1986 – Dandy Nichols, English actress (born 1907)
- 1986 – Minoru Yamasaki, American architect, designed the World Trade Center (born 1912)
- 1987 – Julien Chouinard, Canadian lawyer and jurist (born 1929)
- 1989 – Barbara W. Tuchman, American historian and author (born 1912)
- 1990 – Jimmy Van Heusen, American pianist and composer (born 1913)
- 1991 – Salvador Luria, Italian biologist and physician, Nobel Prize laureate (born 1912)
- 1991 – Danny Thomas, American actor, producer, and humanitarian (born 1914)
- 1993 – Arthur Ashe, American tennis player and sportscaster (born 1943)
- 1994 – Joseph Cotten, American actor (born 1905)
- 1994 – Jack Kirby, American author and illustrator (born 1917)
- 1995 – James Merrill, American poet and playwright (born 1926)
- 1998 – Falco, Austrian pop-rock musician (born 1957)
- 1999 – Don Dunstan, Australian lawyer and politician, 35th Premier of South Australia (born 1926)
- 1999 – Jimmy Roberts, American tenor (born 1924)
- 2000 – Phil Walters, American race car driver (born 1916)
- 2000 – Hani al-Rahib, Syrian novelist and literary academic (born 1939)
- 2001 – Filemon Lagman, Filipino theoretician and activist (born 1953)
- 2001 – Trần Văn Lắm, South Vietnamese diplomat and politician (born 1913)
- 2002 – Max Perutz, Austrian-English biologist and academic, Nobel Prize laureate (born 1914)
- 2004 – Gerald Bouey, Canadian lieutenant and economist (born 1920)
- 2005 – Karl Haas, German-American pianist, conductor, and radio host (born 1913)
- 2007 – Lew Burdette, American baseball player and coach (born 1926)
- 2007 – Frankie Laine, American singer-songwriter and actor (born 1913)
- 2007 – Willye White, American runner and long jumper (born 1939)
- 2008 – Tony Rolt, English race car driver and engineer (born 1918)
- 2009 – Philip Carey, American actor (born 1925)
- 2009 – Shirley Jean Rickert, American actress (born 1926)
- 2009 – James Whitmore, American actor (born 1921)
- 2011 – Gary Moore, Irish singer-songwriter, guitarist, and producer (born 1952)
- 2012 – David Rosenhan, American psychologist and academic (born 1929)
- 2012 – Antoni Tàpies, Spanish painter and sculptor (born 1923)
- 2012 – Janice E. Voss, American engineer and astronaut (born 1956)
- 2013 – Chokri Belaid, Tunisian lawyer and politician (born 1964)
- 2013 – Menachem Elon, German-Israeli academic and jurist (born 1923)
- 2014 – Vasiľ Biľak, Slovak politician (born 1917)
- 2014 – Ralph Kiner, American baseball player and sportscaster (born 1922)
- 2014 – Maxine Kumin, American author and poet (born 1925)
- 2014 – Vaçe Zela, Albanian-Swiss singer and guitarist (born 1939)
- 2015 – André Brink, South African author and playwright (born 1935)
- 2015 – Alan Nunnelee, American lawyer and politician (born 1958)
- 2015 – Pedro León Zapata, Venezuelan cartoonist (born 1929)
- 2016 – Dan Gerson, American screenwriter (born 1966)
- 2016 – Dan Hicks, American singer-songwriter and guitarist (born 1941)
- 2017 – Irwin Corey, American comedian and actor (born 1914)
- 2017 – Inge Keller, German actress (born 1923)
- 2017 – Alec McCowen, English actor (born 1925)
- 2017 – Joost van der Westhuizen, South African rugby union footballer (born 1971)
- 2018 – Donald Lynden-Bell, English astrophysicist (born 1935)
- 2019 – Manfred Eigen, German Nobel Prize winning biophysical chemist (born 1927)
- 2019 – Rosamunde Pilcher, British author (born 1924)
- 2020 – Jhon Jairo Velásquez, Colombian hitman and drug dealer (born 1962)
- 2021 – George Shultz, American politician, Secretary of State, Secretary of the Treasury, Secretary of Labor (born 1920)
- 2022 – Lata Mangeshkar, Indian singer and music composer (born 1929)
- 2023 – Greta Andersen, Danish swimmer (born 1927)
- 2024 – Sebastian Piñera, former Chilean president (born 1949)
- 2025 – Virginia Halas McCaskey, American football executive (born 1923)
- 2025 – Nigel McCrery, English screenwriter, producer and writer (born 1953)

== Holidays and observances ==
- Christian feast day:
  - Amand
  - Dorothea of Caesarea
  - Hildegund, O.Praem.
  - Jacut
  - Mateo Correa Magallanes (one of Saints of the Cristero War)
  - Mél of Ardagh
  - Paul Miki and Twenty-six Martyrs of Japan
  - Relindis (Renule) of Maaseik
  - Vedastus
  - February 6 (Eastern Orthodox liturgics)
- International Day of Zero Tolerance to Female Genital Mutilation (United Nations)
- Ronald Reagan Day (California, United States)
- Sami National Day (Russia, Finland, Norway and Sweden)
- Waitangi Day, celebrates the founding of New Zealand in 1840.
