= Tavanasa Bridge =

Reinforced Concrete Arch Bridge in Switzerland

Vorderrheinbrücke, Tavanasa
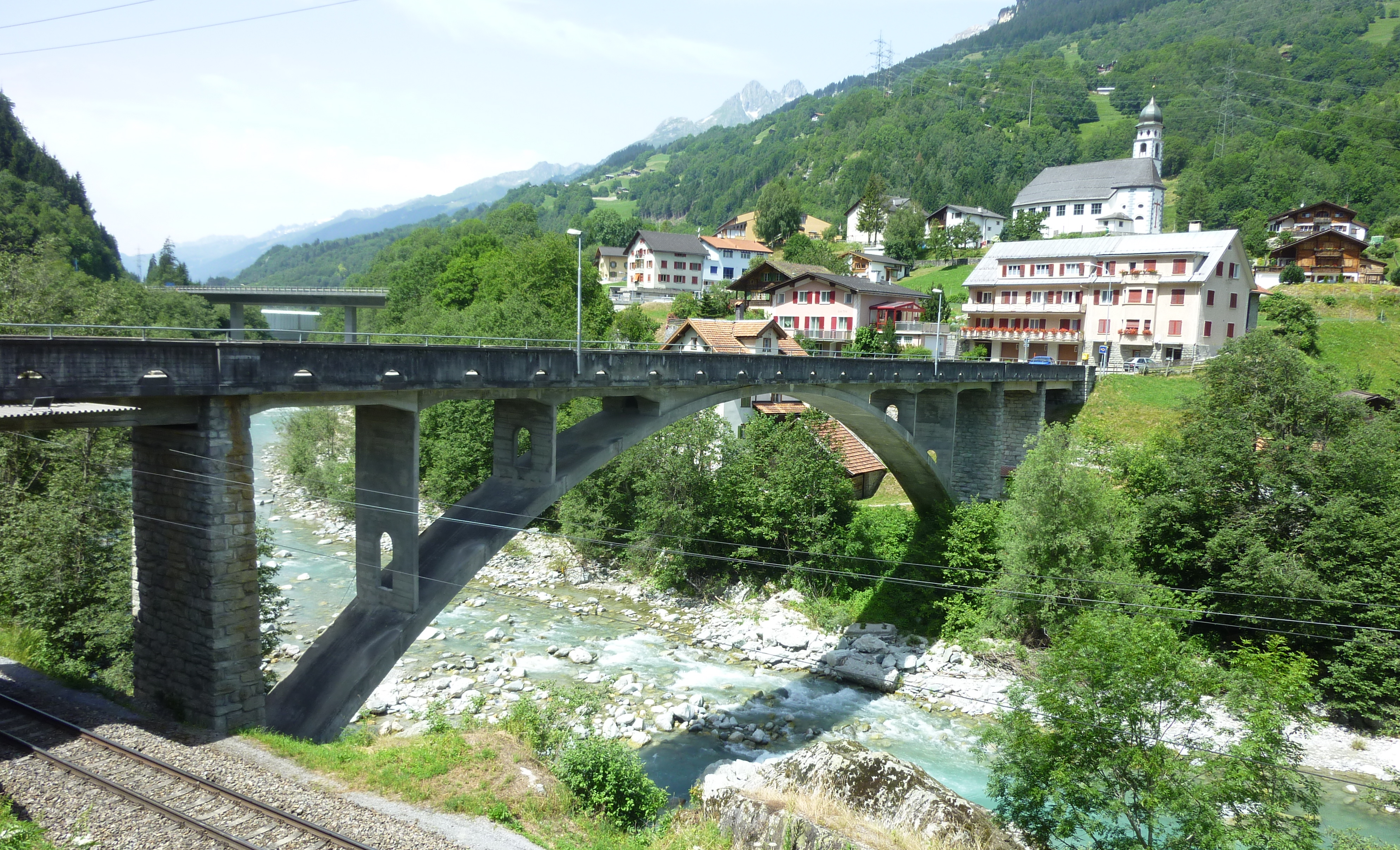
- West facing view of the bridge, towards Tavanasa
- Coordinates: 46°45′13.7″N 9°03′33.5″E
- Crosses: Anterior Rhine
- Locale: Tavanasa, Breil/Brigels, Switzerland

Characteristics
- Design: three-hinged reinforced concrete arch bridge
- Material: Reinforced concrete
- Total length: 85 metres (279 ft)
- Width: 4.0 metres (13.1 ft)
- Height: 11 metres (36 ft)
- Longest span: 50.8 metres (167 ft)
- No. of spans: 1

History
- Designer: Robert Maillart
- Construction start: 1927
- Construction end: 1928
- Construction cost: 125,000 CHF

Location
- Interactive map of Vorderrheinbrücke, Tavanasa

Tavanasa Bridge, also known as Vorderrheinbrücke, Tavanasa is the name of the two reinforced concrete three hinged arch bridges designed by Swiss civil engineer Robert Maillart. The first of these was constructed in 1904, but later destroyed by an avalanche. The second, constructed in 1928 stands to this day.

== History ==
The previous bridge of 1904, saw a development in Maillart's own treatment of the arch. This bridge was a three-hinged reinforced concrete hollow box girder arch bridge, and unlike Maillart's previous bridge at Zuoz, saw the removal of the horizontal members of the box girder near the supports, which had experienced cracking. The replacement of the destroyed bridge however, became a high arch bridge, with the insistence of the canton. Maillart's later Salginatobel Bridge re-uses a similar form.

== Image gallery ==
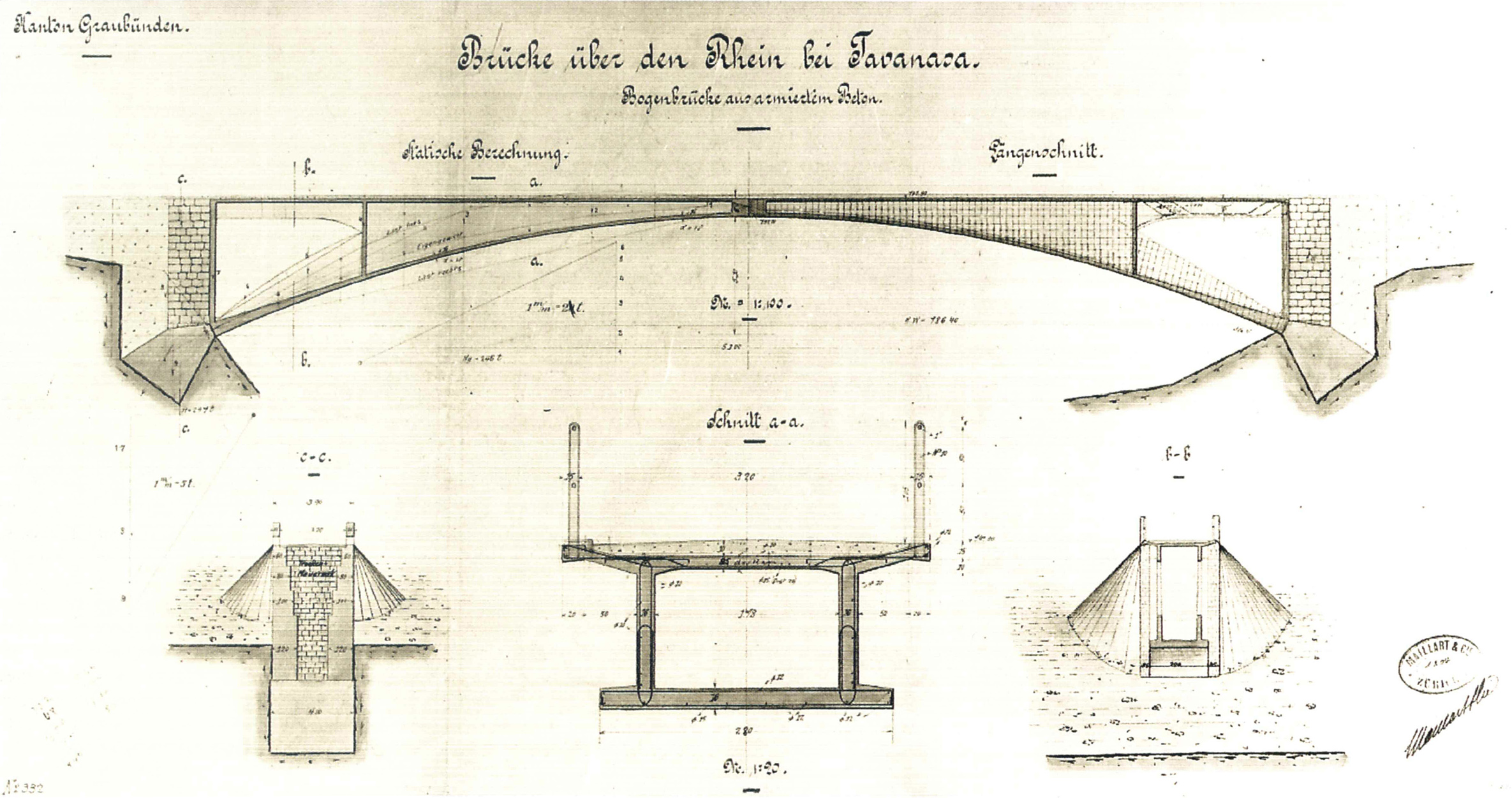
Construction drawing of the first Tavansa Bridge
