= Zuoz Bridge =

Reinforced Concrete Arch Bridge in Switzerland

Innbrücke, Zuoz
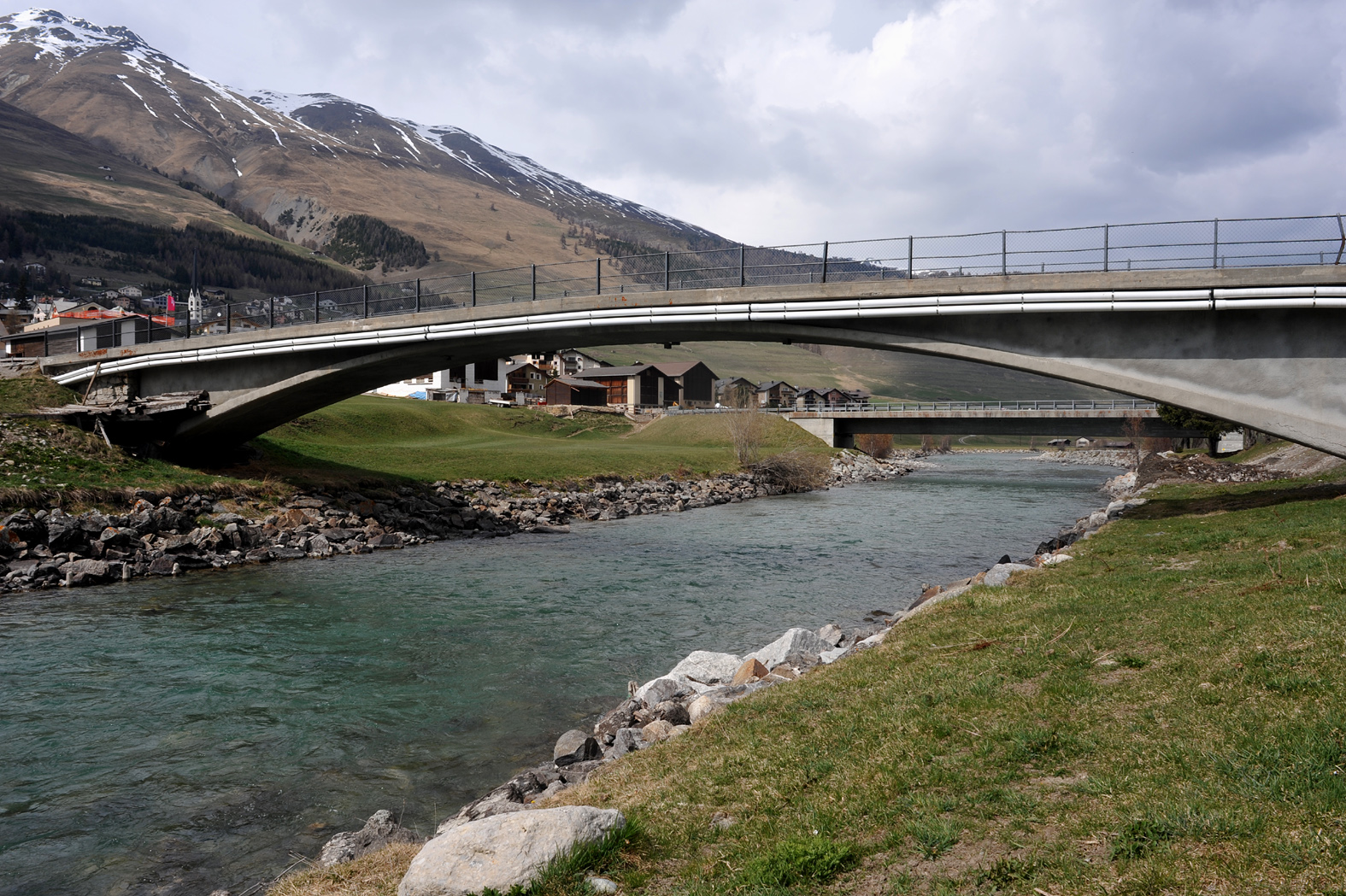
- North facing view of the bridge, towards the town of Zuoz
- Coordinates: 46°35′48.99″N 9°57′45.99″E
- Crosses: Inn
- Locale: Zuoz, Maloja, Graubünden, Switzerland

Characteristics
- Design: three-hinged reinforced concrete arch bridge
- Material: Reinforced concrete
- Total length: 38.3 metres (126 ft)
- Height: 9.6m

History
- Designer: Robert Maillart
- Construction end: 1901

Location
- Interactive map of Innbrücke, Zuoz

The Zuoz Bridge, also known as Innbrücke Zuoz, is a three hinged reinforced concrete box girder hinged arch bridge designed by Swiss civil engineer Robert Maillart, and is the first box girder bridge to be constructed out of reinforced concrete. Constructed in 1901, this was the first of his independently designed reinforced concrete arch bridges.

== Design ==
With reinforced concrete construction still being relatively new at the time, it was standard practice to imitate the forms of masonry construction both structurally and visually. As such, on his previous Stauffacher Bridge in Zürich, architect Gustav Gull designed the concrete arch to be hidden behind a masonry facade. Rather than parting with this non-structural form entirely, Maillart integrated an outer wall of concrete into the Zuoz Bridge, such that the arch increased in depth and the overall stiffness of the structure increased.

Although there was no mathematical approach for proving the structural viability of Maillart's design, Wilhelm Ritter, the cantons consultant suggested that the project go ahead after subjecting it to a full scale load test. Testing revealed acceptable minor cracking, which throughout the structure's life increased, such that on his following 1904 design for the Tavanasa Bridge, Maillart removed those segments of the wall subject to cracking.
