= Salginatobel Bridge =

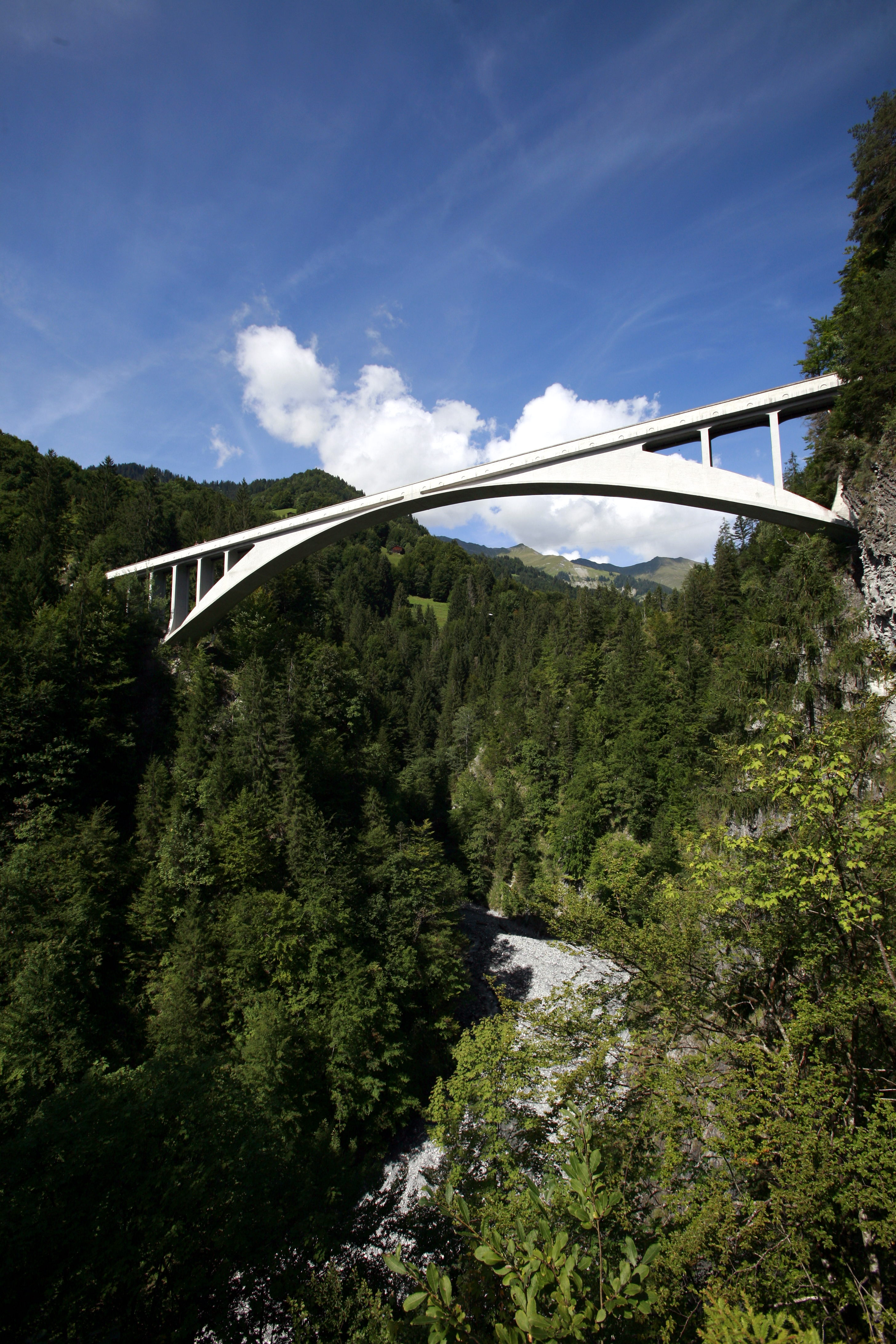
- Southeast view, from an angle
- Coordinates: 46°58′54.55″N 9°43′3.81″E
- Crosses: Salgina Ravine
- Locale: Schiers, Switzerland

Characteristics
- Design: three-hinged reinforced concrete hollow box girder arch bridge
- Material: Reinforced concrete
- Total length: 133 metres (436 ft)
- Width: 3.5 metres (11 ft)
- Height: 90 metres (300 ft)
- Longest span: 90 metres (300 ft)
- No. of spans: 1
- Load limit: 8000kg

History
- Designer: Robert Maillart
- Construction start: 1929
- Construction end: 1930
- Construction cost: 180,000 CHF
- Opened: 1930-08-13

Location
- Interactive map of Salginatobel Bridge

Salginatobel Bridge is a reinforced concrete arch bridge designed by Swiss civil engineer Robert Maillart. It was constructed across an alpine ravine in the grisonian Prättigau, belonging to the municipality of Schiers, in Switzerland between 1929 and 1930. In 1991, it was declared an International Historic Civil Engineering Landmark, the thirteenth such structure and the first concrete bridge so designated.

As with his Schwandbach Bridge and Vessy Bridge, the structure's fame among civil engineers is a consequence of the techniques involved and the elegance of its design rather than its prominent location: it connects the village Schiers – on valley floor of the route between Landquart and Davos – with the alpine hamlet Schuders of almost 100 people, where the alpine post road ends, but is often visited by designers.

== Design and history ==
Maillart had previously designed a three-hinged arch bridge over the Rhine at Tavanasa in 1904. In the 51 metres (167 ft) span Tavanasa bridge, the arch is thinnest at its crown and springing points, thickening in between to reflect the shape of its bending moment diagram. This bridge was destroyed by an avalanche in September 1927. Although Maillart didn't win the contract for a replacement bridge, he entered a competition the following year for the bridge at Salginatobel, with a three-hinged arch spanning 90 metres (300 ft) that used the same overall form as at Tavanasa. In conjunction with contractor Florian Prader, Maillart's design was the least expensive of nineteen entries.

The Salginatobel bridge arch is 133 metres (436 ft) long in total, and its main element is a hollow concrete box girder over the central part of the arch. It carries a roadway 3.5 metres (11 ft) wide, supported on reinforced concrete pillars above the ends of the arches.

The falsework was built by the Graubünden carpenter Richard Coray in late summer 1929, and the rest of the construction started in 1930. The bridge was officially opened on 18 August 1930.

Although regarded as a pioneering work, several aspects of its construction lacked durability, such as the absence of bridge deck waterproofing, low concrete cover and poor drainage. In 1975 and 1976 it was extensively repaired, the parapets were modified, and waterproofing was added. However, by 1991, deterioration had continued, with the parapets becoming unsafe. The waterproofing and drainage were replaced and amended, and most of the existing concrete surface removed and replaced by shotcrete. The parapets were completely rebuilt. Completed in 1998, this repair work cost 1.3 million US dollars.

== Praise and criticism ==
- 1947, the bridge was featured with other of Maillart's works in a four-month exhibit at the Museum of Modern Art, New York
- Salginatobel Bridge was designated a Swiss heritage site of national significance.
- 1991, it was designated an International Historic Civil Engineering Landmark by the American Society of Civil Engineers

The bridge has received widespread attention since its innovative design and construction, including considerable praise from other bridge engineers, architects and architectural historians. Writing in 2000, Heinrich Figi said:

From a conceptual point of view, the Salginatobel Bridge is an excellent structure.

David P. Billington has been particularly enthusiastic about the bridge:

Its visual elegance ... goes together with its technical brilliance.

Such works at Maillart's, being at the very highest level of engineering achievement and being works of art, must be protected.

The German bridge engineer Fritz Leonhardt has suggested that:

These Maillart-type arch bridges only look good in special situations as here over a gorge and against a mountainous background.

Maillart was not entirely satisfied with the bridge, writing after its completion that its soffit should have been a pointed rather than a pure curved arch, if it were properly to match his structural analysis:

Even the [Salginatobel Bridge] cannot lay claim to complete sincerity of form. Indeed, if both constant and shifting weights are taken into consideration, the extreme curves of exerted pressures form two lenticular surfaces whose lower contours meet at an acute angle.

== Image gallery ==
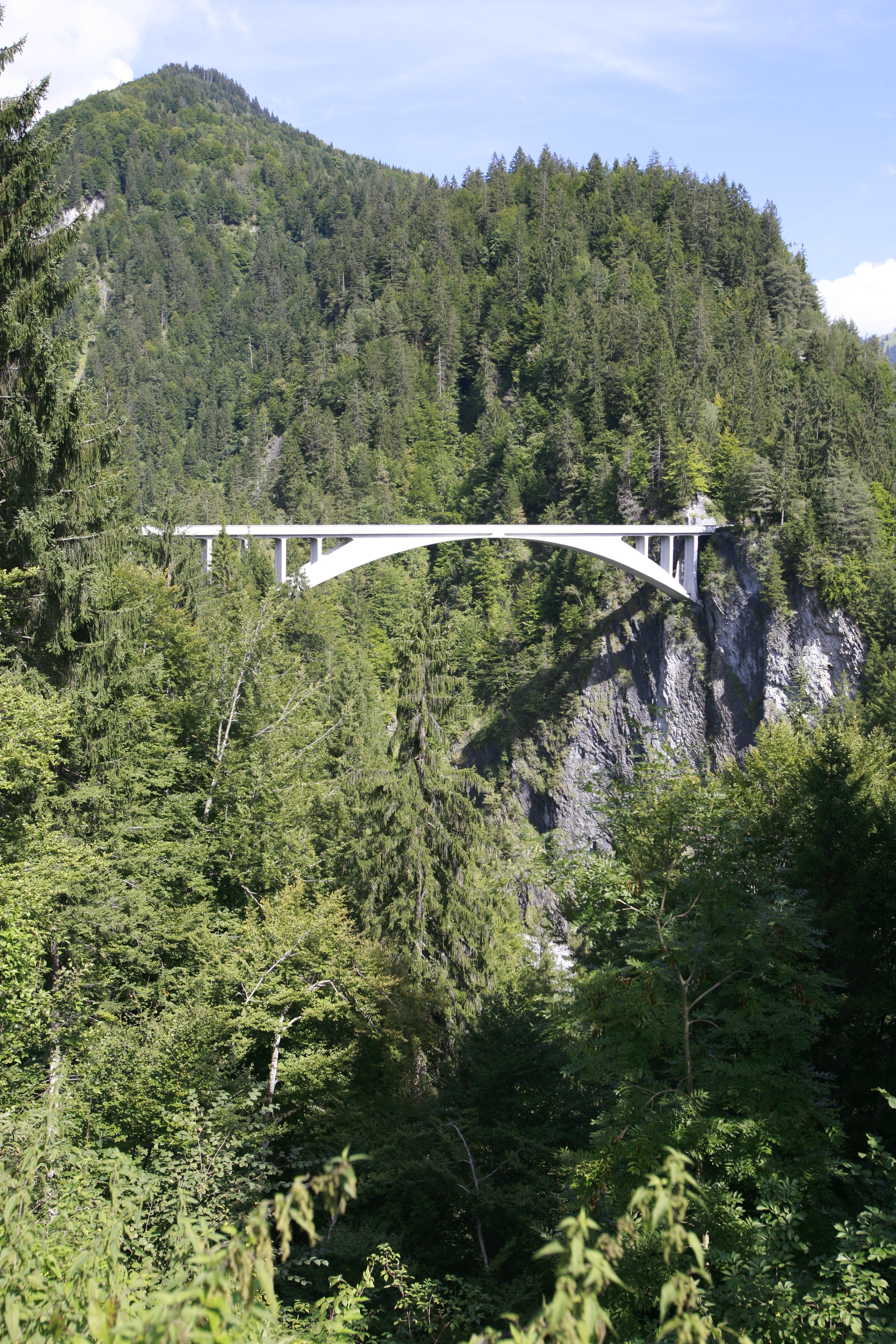
Southeast view

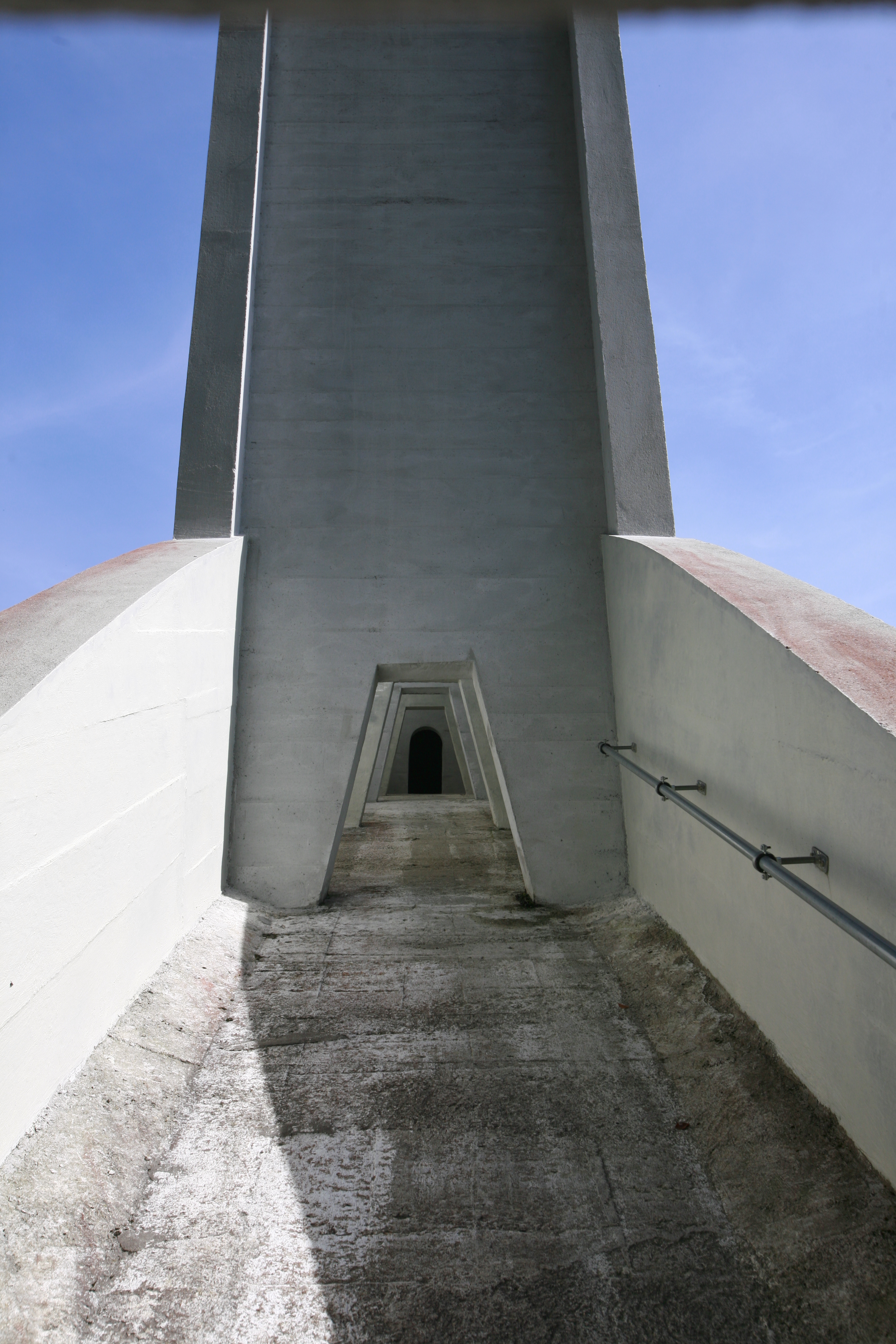
Hollow concrete box girder

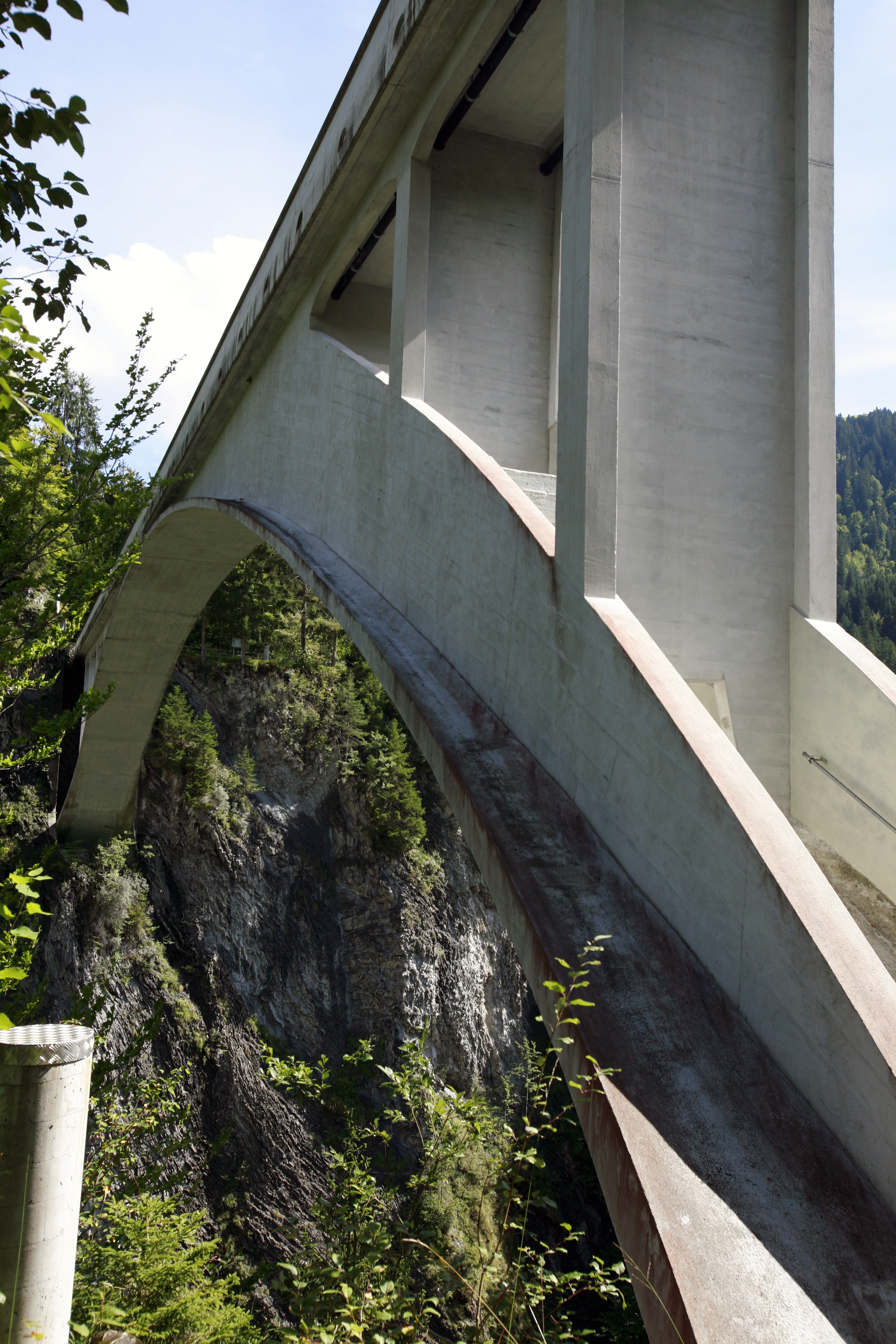
The arch

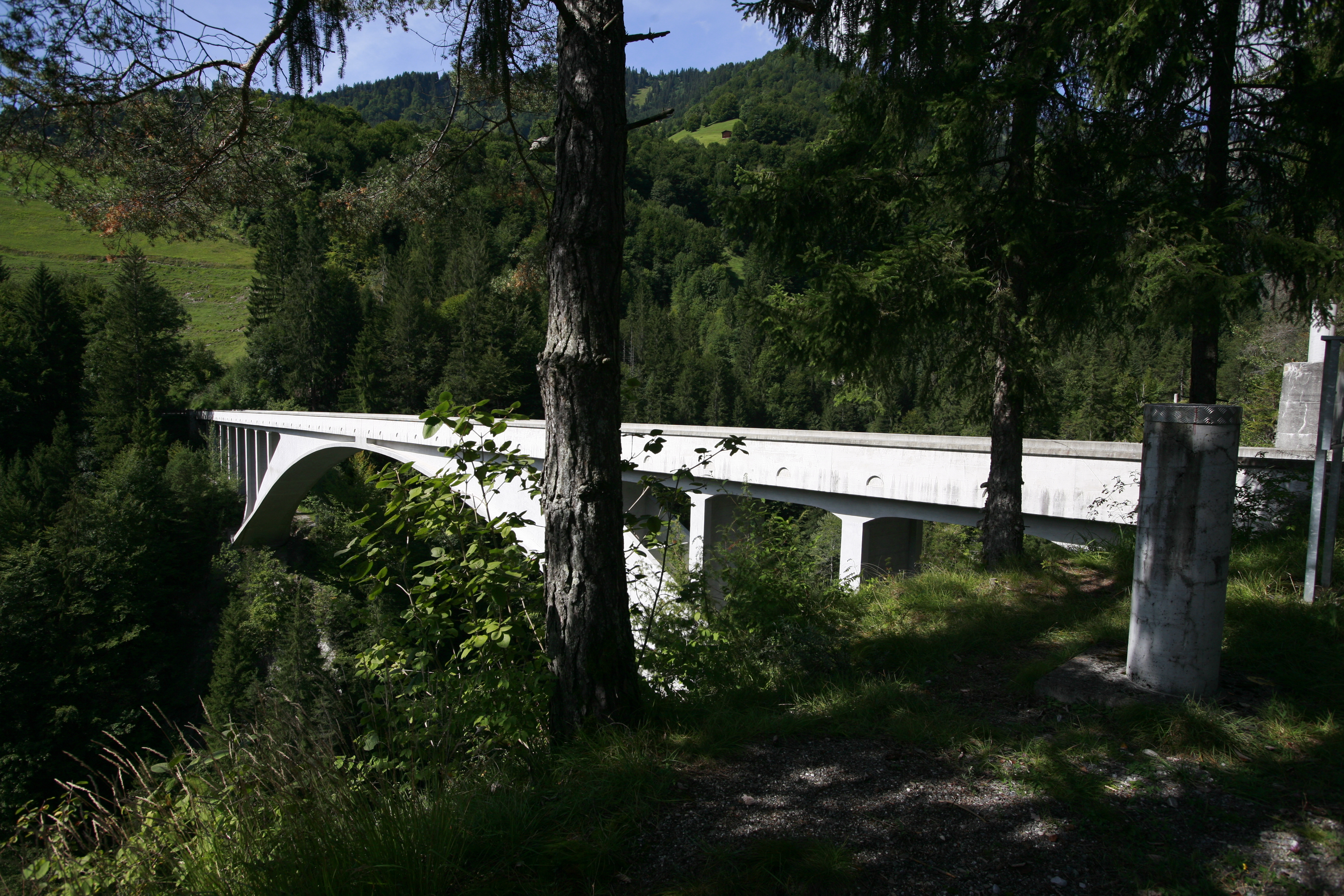
