= Robert Maillart =

Swiss civil engineer and bridge designer

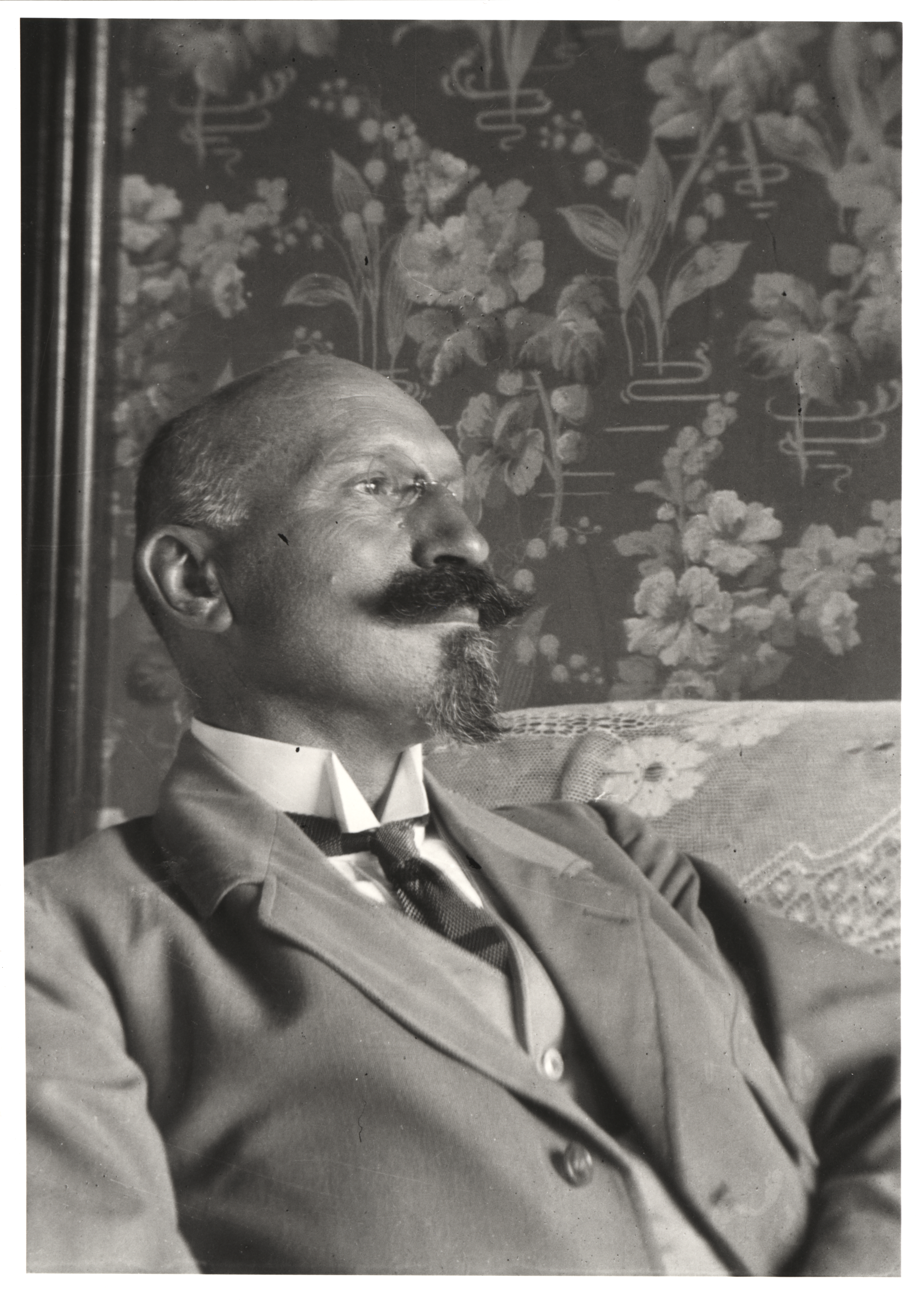
Robert Maillart, c. 1925

Robert Maillart (16 February 1872 – 5 April 1940) was a Swiss civil engineer who revolutionized the use of structural reinforced concrete with such designs as the three-hinged arch and the deck-stiffened arch for bridges, and the beamless floor slab and mushroom ceiling for industrial buildings. His Salginatobel (1929–1930) and Schwandbach (1933) bridges changed the aesthetics and engineering of bridge construction dramatically and influenced decades of architects and engineers after him. In 1991 the Salginatobel Bridge was declared an International Historic Civil Engineering Landmark by the American Society of Civil Engineers.

== Early life and education ==
Robert Maillart was born on 6 February 1872 in Bern, Switzerland. He attended the Federal Institute of Technology in Zurich and studied structural engineering at Zurich ETH from 1890 to 1894, lectures by Wilhelm Ritter on graphical statics forming part of the curriculum. Maillart did not excel in academic theories, but understood the necessity to make assumptions and visualize when analyzing a structure. A traditional method prior to the 1900s was to use shapes that could be analyzed easily using mathematics.

This overuse of mathematics annoyed Maillart, as he greatly preferred to stand back and use common sense to predict full-scale performance. Also, as he rarely tested his bridges prior to construction, only upon completion would he verify the bridge was adequate. He often tested his bridges by crossing them himself. This attitude towards bridge design and construction was what provided him with his innovative designs.

== Career ==
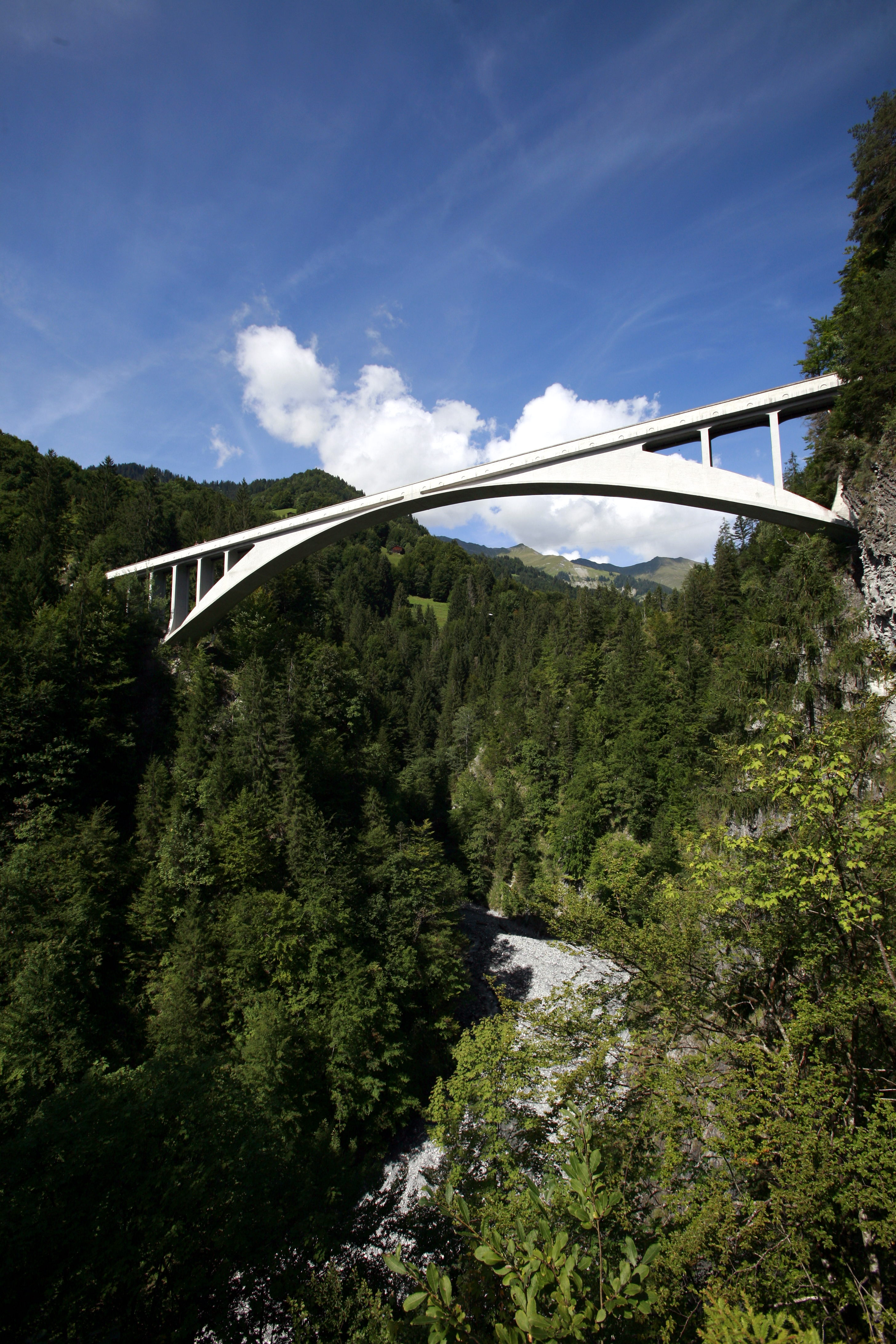
Salginatobel Bridge

Maillart returned to Bern to work for three years with Pümpin & Herzog (1894–1896). He next worked for two years with the city of Zurich, then for a few years with a private firm there.

By 1902, Maillart established his own firm, Maillart & Cie. In 1912 he moved his family with him to Russia while he managed construction of major projects for large factories and warehouses in Kharkov, Riga and St. Petersburg, as Russia was industrializing, with the help of Swiss investments. Unaware of the outbreak of World War I, Maillart was caught in the country with his family. In 1916 his wife died, and in 1917 the Communist Revolution and nationalizing of assets caused him to lose his projects and bonds. When the widower Maillart and his three children returned to Switzerland, he was penniless and heavily in debt to Swiss banks. After that he had to work for other firms, but the best of his designs were still to come. By 1920 he moved to an engineering office in Geneva, which later had offices in Bern and Zurich.

== Development and use of reinforced concrete ==
The first use of concrete as a major bridge construction material was in 1856. It was used to form a multiple-arch structure on the Grand Maître Aqueduct in France. The concrete was cast in its crudest form, a huge mass without reinforcement. Later in the nineteenth century, engineers explored the possibilities of reinforced concrete as a structural material. They found that the concrete carried compressive forces, while steel bars carried the tension forces. This made concrete a better material for structures.

Joseph Monier, from France, is credited with being the first to understand the principles of reinforced concrete. He embedded an iron-wire mesh into concrete. He was a gardener, not a licensed engineer, and sold his patents to contractors who built the first generation of reinforced concrete bridges in Europe. He also perfected the technique of pre-stressing concrete, which leaves permanent compressive stresses in concrete arches.

By the early twentieth century, reinforced concrete became an acceptable substitute in construction for all previous structural materials, such as stone, wood, and steel. People such as Monier had developed useful techniques for design and construction, but no one had created new forms that showed the full aesthetic nature of reinforced concrete.

Robert Maillart had an intuition and genius that exploited the aesthetic of concrete. He designed three-hinged arches in which the deck and the arch ribs were combined, to produce closely integrated structures that evolved into stiffened arches of very thin reinforced concrete and concrete slabs. The Salginatobel Bridge (1930) and Schwandbach Bridge (1933) are classic examples of Maillart's three-hinged arch bridges and deck-stiffened arch bridges, respectively. They have been recognized for their elegance and their influence on the later design and engineering of bridges.

These designs went beyond the common boundaries of concrete design in Maillart's time. Both of the bridges mentioned above are great examples of Maillart's ability to simplify design in order to allow for maximum use of materials and to incorporate the natural beauty of the structure's environment. Selected from among 19 entrants in a design competition in part because of the low cost of his proposal, Maillart began construction of the Salginatobal Bridge in Schiers, Switzerland in 1929; it opened on 13 August 1930.

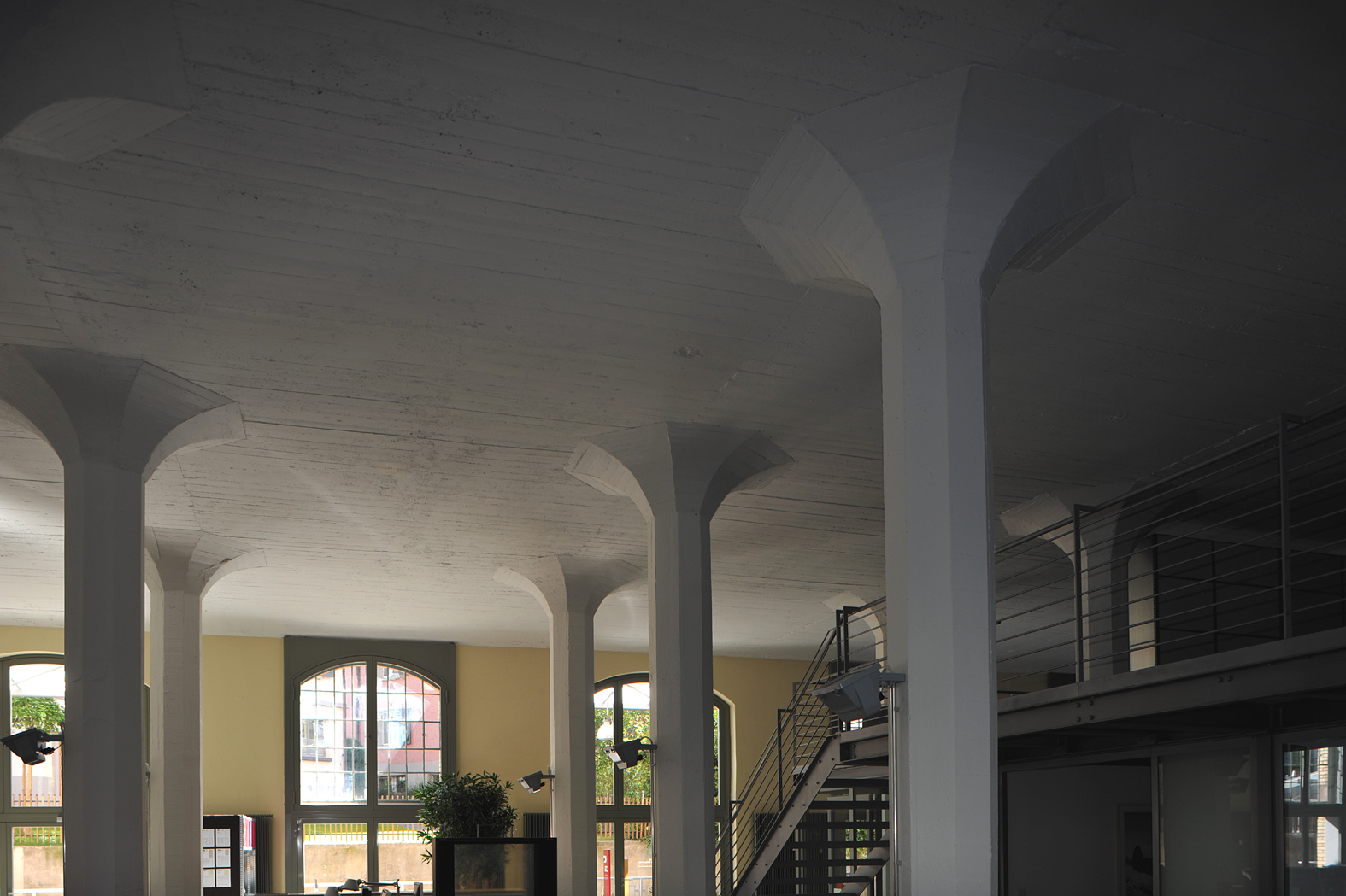
Maillart's first mushroom slab in the warehouse Giesshübel in Zurich (1910)

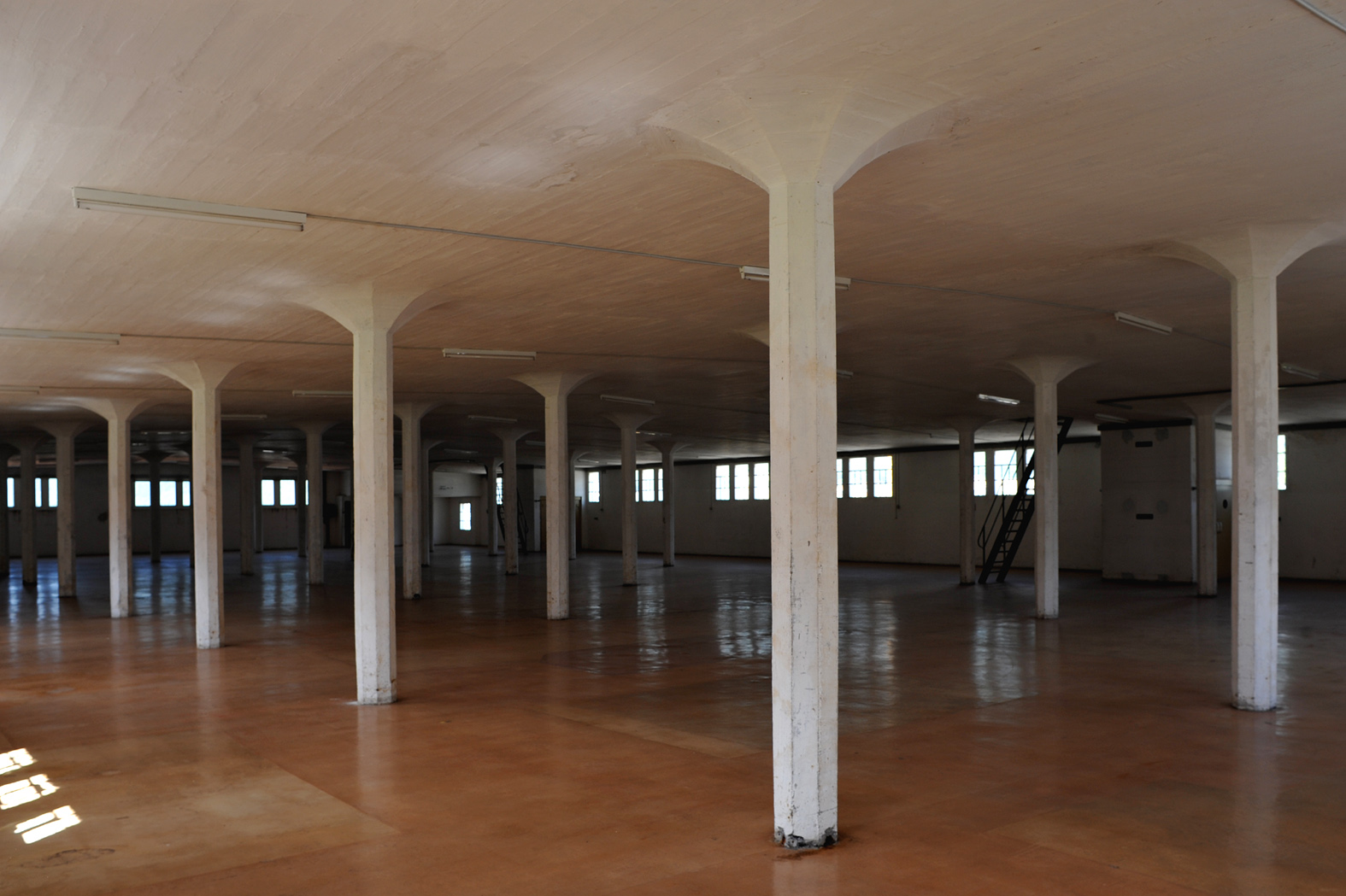
Mushroom slab on the third floor of the Grain storage of the Swiss Confederation in Altdorf (1912)

Maillart is known also for his revolutionary column design in a number of buildings. He constructed his first mushroom ceiling for a warehouse in Zurich, together with treating the concrete floor as a slab, rather than reinforcing it with beams. One of his most famous is the design of the columns in the water filtration plant in Rorschach, Switzerland. Maillart decided to abandon standard methods in order to create "the more rational and more beautiful European method of building". Maillart's design of the columns included flaring the tops to reduce the bending moment in the beams between the columns. With the flare, the columns formed slight arches to transfer the loads from the ceiling beams to the columns.

Maillart also flared the bottom of the columns to reduce the pressure (force per area) on a certain point of the soil foundation. By flaring the bottoms of the columns, the area of the load was more widely distributed, therefore reducing the pressure over the soil foundation.

Many of his predecessors had modeled by this method using wood and steel, but Maillart was revolutionary in being the first to use concrete. He used concrete because it could support a large mound of earthen material for insulation against freezing. Since concrete is very good in compression situations, it was the perfect material to support a large, unmoving mass of earth.

His technique was used to build the Ponte Del Ciolo (Ciolo's Bridge), which is located at Ciolo in Apulia.

== Legacy and honors ==
- 1936, elected as Fellow to Royal Institute of British Architects (RIBA)
- 1947, an exhibit on Robert Maillart at the Museum of Modern Art in New York featured his bridges and design work
- Salginatobel Bridge was designated a Swiss heritage site of national significance.
- 1991, the American Society of Civil Engineers declared the Salginatobel Bridge an International Historic Civil Engineering Landmark.
- 2001, the British trade journal, Bridge – Design and Engineering, voted Maillart's Salginatobel Bridge "the most beautiful bridge of the century".

== Analytical methods ==
By the second half of the nineteenth century, major advances in design theory, graphic statics, and knowledge of material strengths had been achieved. As the nineteenth century neared its end, the major factor contributing to the need for scientific design of bridges was the railroads. Engineers had to know the precise levels of stresses in bridge members, in order to accommodate the impact of trains. The first design solution was obtained by Squire Whipple in 1847. His major breakthrough was that truss members could be analyzed as a system of forces in equilibrium. This system, known as the "method of joints," permits the determination of stresses in all known members of a truss if two forces are known. The next advance in design was the "method of sections," developed by Wilhelm Ritter in 1862. Ritter simplified the calculations of forces by developing a very simple formula for determining the forces in the members intersected by a cross-section. A third advance was a better method of graphical analysis, developed independently by James Clerk Maxwell (UK) and Karl Culmann. (Switzerland).

Robert Maillart learned the analytical methods of his era, but he was most influenced by the principles developed by his mentor, Wilhelm Ritter, mentioned above. Maillart studied under Ritter, who had three basic principles of design. The first of these was to value calculations based on simple analysis, so that appropriate assumptions could be made based on common sense. The second was to consider carefully the construction process of the structure, not just the final product. The last principle was to test a structure always with full-scale load tests. All these principles are an adaptation of the available techniques, but with an emphasis on the careful study of previously built structures.

At the time of Maillart and Ritter, other designers preferred that their designs evolve from previously successful structures and designs. German engineers and scientists had developed elaborate mathematical techniques, and were confident that they did not need practical load tests of their designs developed using those techniques. However, these techniques did not encourage designers to think of unusual shapes, because those shapes could not be completely analyzed using the available mathematical techniques. Ritter's principles did allow for uncommon shapes.

== Bridges ==
- Tavanasa Bridge
- Arve Bridge
- Zuoz Bridge
- Stauffacher Bridge
- Salginatobel Bridge
- Schwandbach Bridge
- Bohlbach Bridge
- Rossgraben Bridge
- Traubach Bridge
- Vessy Bridge

== See also ==
- Hugh John Flemming Bridge (1960), Canada
- Mike O'Callaghan – Pat Tillman Memorial Bridge (2010), United States

== Sources ==
- ASCE, Notable Engineers - Robert Maillart, History and Heritage of Civil Engineering, undated
- Bill, Max, Robert Maillart Bridges and Constructions, Verlag für Architektur, Zurich, 1949
- Billington, David P., Robert Maillart’s Bridges: The Art of Engineering, Princeton University Press, 1978
- Billington, David P., Robert Maillart and the Art of Reinforced Concrete, Architectural History Foundation, 1991
- Billington, David P., Robert Maillart: Builder, Designer, and Artist, Cambridge University Press, 1997
- Billington, David P., The Art of Structural Design: A Swiss Legacy, Princeton University Press, 2003
- DeLony, E., Context for World Heritage Bridges, ICOMOS and TICCIH, 1996
- Molgaard, John, "The Engineering Profession", lecture to Faculty of Engineering and Applied Science, Memorial University of Newfoundland, 1995
- Laffranchi, Massimo and Peter Marti. "Robert Maillart's curved concrete arch bridges", Journal of Structural Engineering 123.10 (1997): 1280 Academic Search Elite. 8 February 2007
- Fausto Giovannardi "Robert Maillart e l'emancipazione del cemento armato", Fausto Giovannardi, Borgo San Lorenzo, 2007.
- Robert Maillart at Structurae
