= Wilhelm von Scherff =

Wilhelm von Scherff (6 February 1834 – 1911) was a German general and military writer.

Originally from Frankfurt, he joined the Prussian army in 1852. From 1856 to 1859 he attended the Kriegsschule, and from 1860 to 1866 served as Adjutant in the Prussian army. He took part in the Austro-Prussian War of 1866 and the Franco-Prussian War of 1870–71 as a general staff officer. From 1873 to 1878 he was a teacher of military tactics at the Prussian Military Academy.

In 1879, he was a member of the border adjustment commission in Bulgaria, and after his return he became commander of the 29th infantry regiment. In 1882 he became head of the general staff of the XIth Army Corps, in 1883 Brigade commander, and in 1888 Lieutenant General and commander of the 33rd infantry division in Strasbourg.

== Works ==
- Studien zur neuen Infanterie-Taktik. A. Bath, 1872–1876
- Die Infanterie auf dem Exercierplatze. Anhaltspunkte und Beispiele für die Ausbildung zum Gefecht. 1873
- Die Lehre von der Truppenverwendung als Vorschule für die Kunst der Truppenführung. A. Bath, 1876–1879
- Einige taktische Grundsätze als Anhalt für die Ausbildung der Infanterie zum Gefecht und Kampfe. A. Bath, 1879
- Reglementarische Studien. 1891–1892
- Praktische Taktik und taktische Theorie; polemische Betrachtungen über reglementarische Fragen. 1893
- Unsere heutige Infanterie-Taktik im Spiegel der Augustkämpfe 1870 um Metz. 1893
- Kriegslehren in kriegsgeschichtlichen Beispielen der Neuzeit. E.S Mittler und Sohn, 1894–1897
- Die Lehre vom Kriege, auf der Grundlage seiner neuzeitlichen Erscheinungsformen. E.S. Mittler und Sohn, 1897
- Der Schlachtenangriff: im Lichte der Schlichtingschen "Taktischen Grundsätze" und der Boguslawskischen "Betrachtungen." 1898
- Vergleichender Rückblick auf die neueste Tagesliteratur über den Infanterieangriff. 1906
