= Zdenka Ziková =

Czech opera singer (1902–1990)

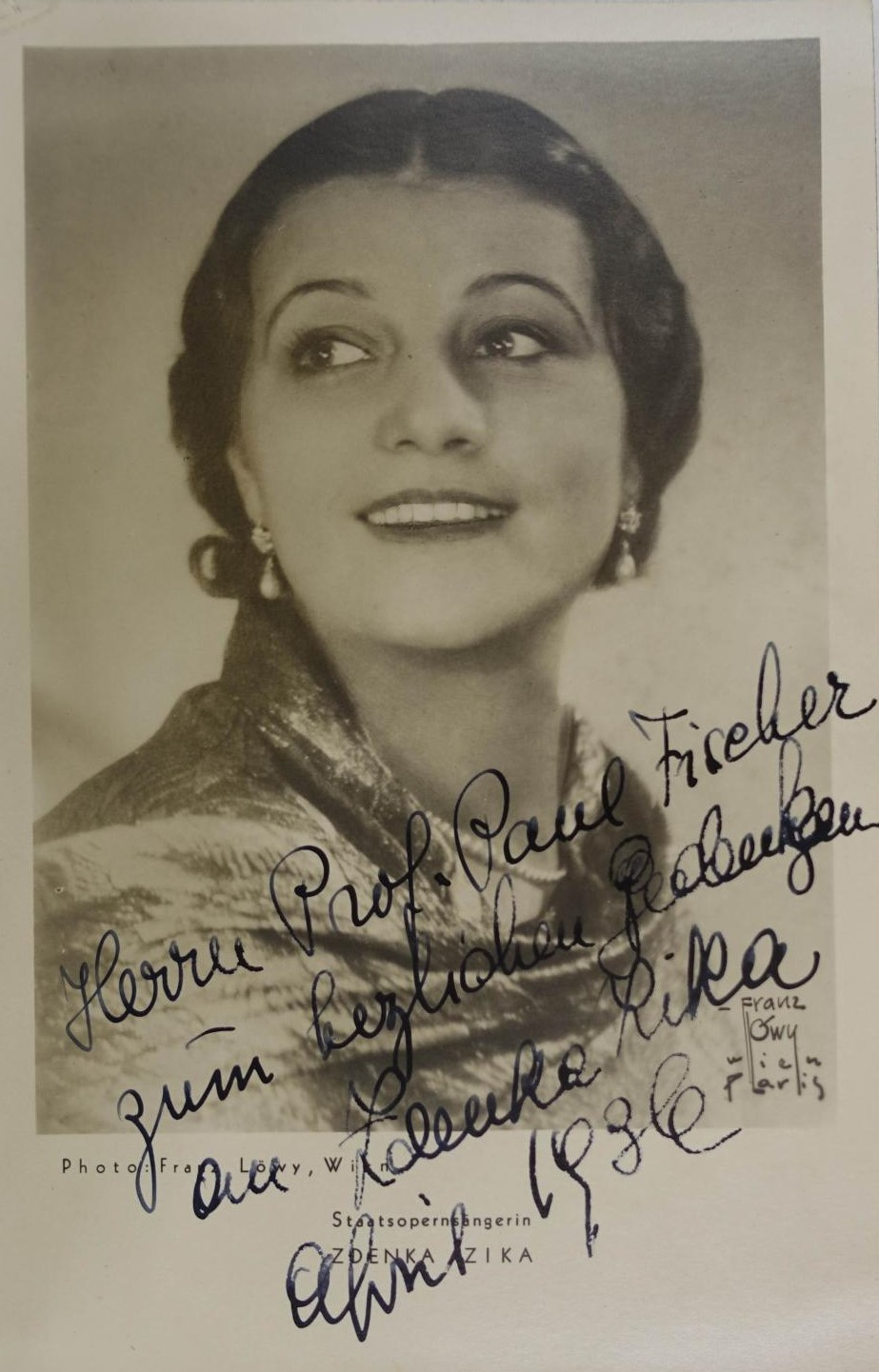
- Ziková in 1936
- Born: 6 February 1902; Prague, Austria-Hungary
- Died: 4 June 1990 (aged 88); Prague, Czechoslovakia
- Other name: Zdenka Zika
- Occupations: Opera singer; music teacher
- Spouse: Fridrik Rukavina (died 1940)

Zdenka Ziková (6 February 1902 – 4 June 1990), also known as Zdenka Zika, was a Czech soprano opera singer and music teacher.

== Early life and education ==
Zdenka Ziková was born on 6 February 1902 in Prague to Josip and Anna (née Kainz). She was a relative of František Škroup, the composer of the Czech national anthem. She was taught the basics of singing by B. Rosenkrancová before furthering her studies in Italy and Vienna.

== Career ==
In 1922, Ziková made her stage debut in Prague. That same year she became a soloist at the Ljubljana Opera House, performing there for the next two years. From 1924, she was employed at the Zagreb Opera, where she frequently performed with Mario Šimenc. From 1928 to 1932, she engaged at the National Theatre, Prague. In June 1933, Ziková performed Bedřich Smetana's The Bartered Bride in Chicago as part of the Congress of the Czechoslovak Sokol. From 1932 to 1937, she was engaged at the Vienna State Opera. Ziková was one of the leading cast members at the National Theatre in Belgrade from 1940 to 1959.

On 4 May 1940, she was arrested by Yugoslavian secret police on suspicion of aiding Nazi propaganda efforts following reports of a German propaganda cell operating at the Belgrade National Opera. Three other opera employees were also arrested as part of a wider crackdown on perceived Nazi sympathisers. Ziková remained in the country after the Invasion of Yugoslavia the subsequent year. After the end of World War II, she made guest appearances in Germany, France, Bulgaria, Poland, Italy, and Switzerland.

== Later life and death ==
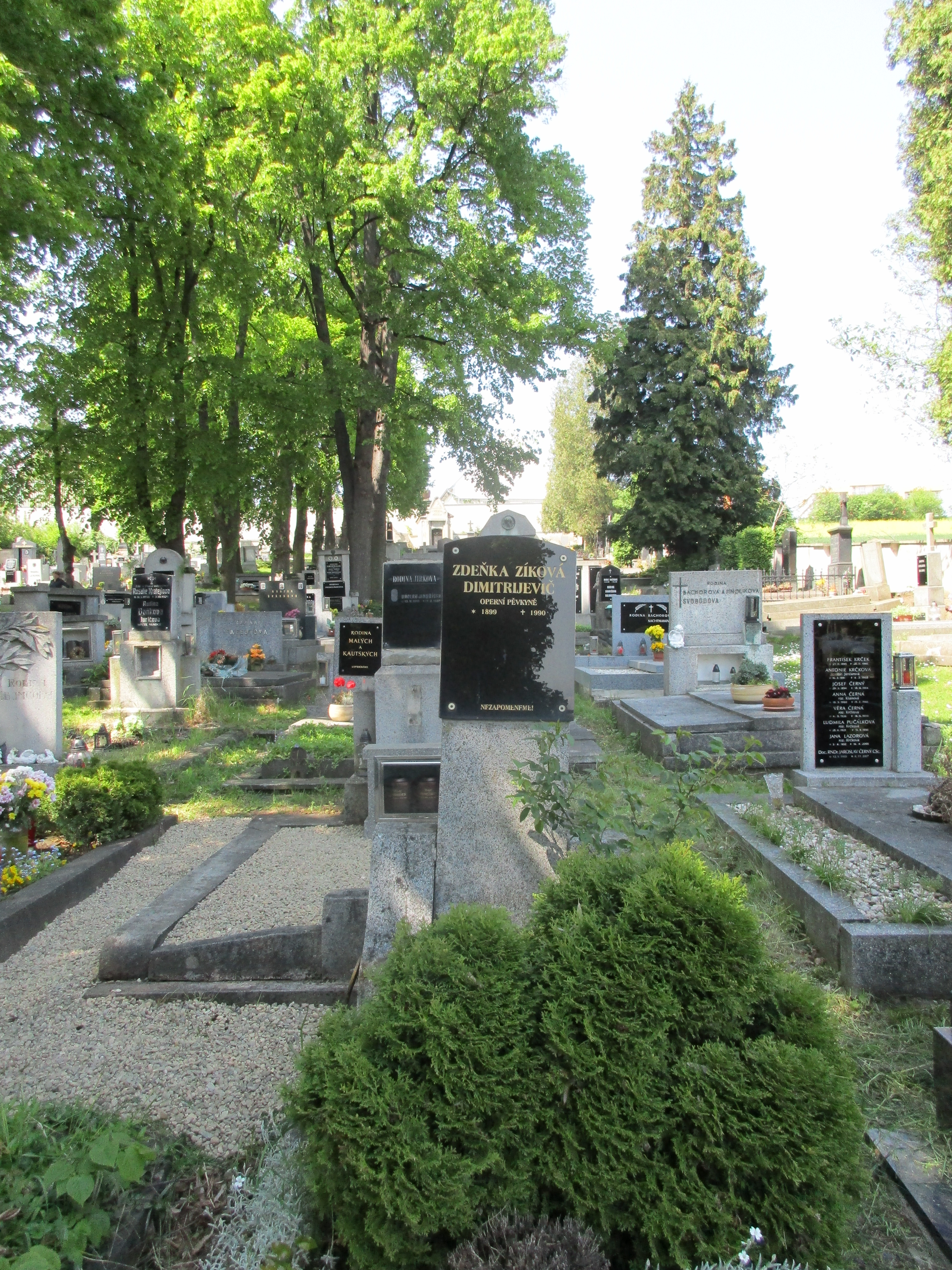
Zdenka Zikova's grave at Řeporyje Cemetery

Ziková's last guest stage appearance was as Milady in Smetana's Dalibor. From 1959, she taught at the Academy of Music in Belgrade, becoming a professor there in 1964. Ziková continued teaching at the academy until 1975.

Ziková was married to the conductor Fridrik Rukavina; he died in 1940. She died on 4 June 1990 in Prague, at the age of 88.
