= Schwandbach Bridge =

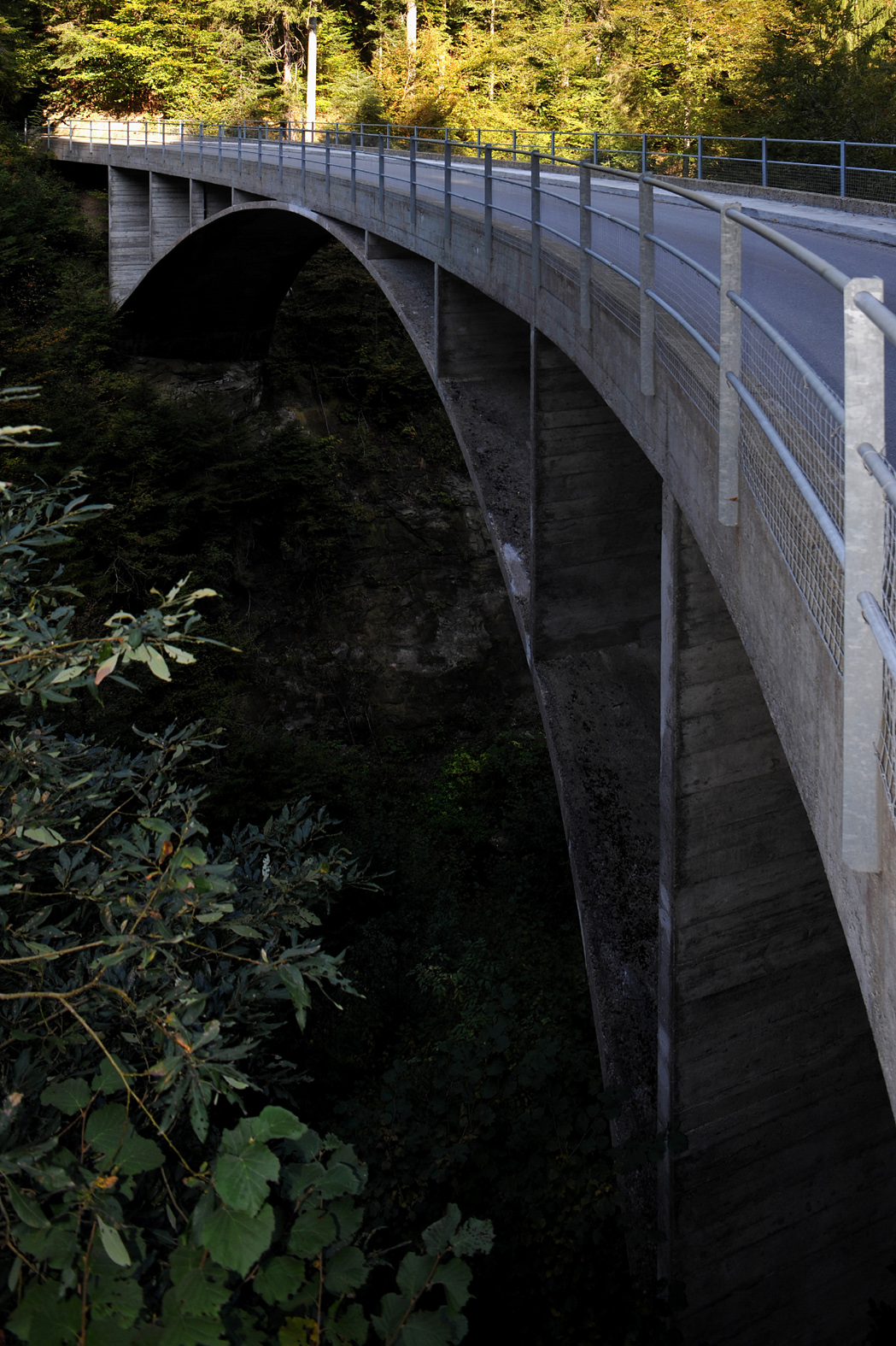
- Southeast view, from an angle
- Coordinates: 46°49′45.68″N 7°24′8.426″E
- Crosses: Schwandbach
- Locale: east of Schwarzenburg, Switzerland

Characteristics
- Design: deck-stiffened reinforced concrete arch bridge
- Material: Reinforced concrete
- Total length: 55.6 metres (182 ft)
- Width: arch: 4.2 metres (14 ft) to 6 metres (20 ft), road: 4.9 metres (16 ft)
- Longest span: 37 metres (121 ft)
- No. of spans: 1

History
- Designer: Robert Maillart
- Construction start: 1933-08
- Construction end: 1933-11
- Construction cost: 47,298 CHF
- Opened: 1933-11-29

The Schwandbach Bridge is a deck-stiffened reinforced concrete arch bridge near Bern in Switzerland, designed by Robert Maillart and completed in November 1933 at a cost of 47,298 CHF.

== Design ==
The bridge has a main span of 37 metres, and a total length of 55.6m. The arch is polygonal rather than curved, and is only 200 mm thick. It supports the bridge deck via 160 mm thick reinforced concrete cross walls. The deck is thicker than the arch, and is stiff enough to prevent the slender arch from buckling. The highway deck is curved in plan. The arch varies in width from 4.2 metres to 6 metres, with one edge forming a straight line between river banks, and the other following the curve of the road. This arrangement helps to resist centrifugal forces from the traffic loads and from the curved deck's tendency to twist.

== Reception ==
The bridge is regarded as one of Maillart's masterpieces. Unlike his previous arched Valtschielbach Bridge, it relies entirely on reinforced concrete and lacks masonry arch approaches.

In 1947 the bridge was featured with other of Maillart's works in a four-month exhibit at the Museum of Modern Art, New York

The architectural historian David Billington has written:

"Integration of form here is as fully developed as in any concrete bridge ... All parts exhibit their true thicknesses, with nothing hidden for effect ... With the two mature masterpieces at Töss and Schwandbach, Maillart reached a climax in his building of deck-stiffened arch bridge."
