= Prättigau/Davos District =

Coordinates: 46°48′N 9°49′E

Prättigau/Davos District Bezirk Prättigau/Davos
- District
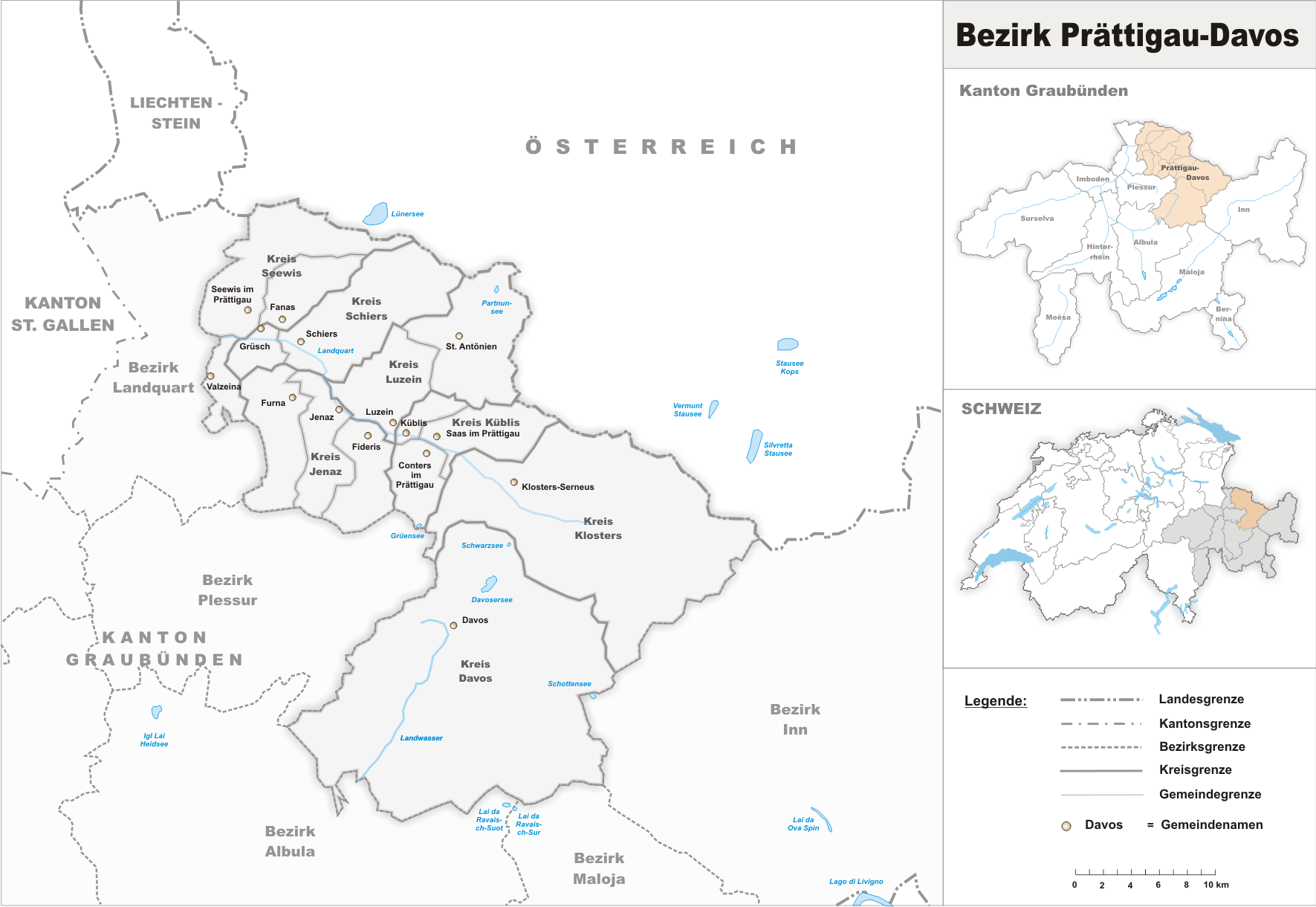
- Country: Switzerland
- Canton: Grisons
- Capital: Davos

Area
  - Total: 853.40 km^{2} (329.50 sq mi)

Population (December 2015)
  - Total: 26,257
  - Density: 30.768/km^{2} (79.688/sq mi)
- Time zone: UTC+1 (CET)
  - Summer (DST): UTC+2 (CEST)
- Municipalities: 13

Prättigau/Davos District (German: Bezirk Prättigau/Davos, Romansh: District da Partenz-Tavau) is a former administrative district in the canton of the Grisons, Switzerland. It had an area of 823.95 km^{2} (318.13 sq mi) and has a population of 26,257 in 2015. It was replaced with the Prättigau/Davos Region on 1 January 2017 as part of a reorganization of the Canton.

It consists of seven Kreise (sub-districts) and fifteen municipalities:

Davos sub-district
Municipality	Population (31 December 2020)	Area (km²)
Davos	10,832	254.48

Jenaz sub-district
Municipality	Population (31 December 2020)	Area (km²)
Fideris	595	25.32
Furna	207	33.25
Jenaz	1,147	25.95

Klosters sub-district
Municipality	Population (31 December 2020)	Area (km²)
Klosters-Serneus	4,416	193.16

Küblis sub-district
Municipality	Population (31 December 2020)	Area (km²)
Conters im Prättigau	220	18.40
Küblis	891	8.13

Luzein sub-district
Municipality	Population (31 December 2020)	Area (km²)
Luzein	1,596	31.63
St. Antönien	331	52.2

Schiers sub-district
Municipality	Population (31 December 2020)	Area (km²)
Grüsch	2,115	43.30
Schiers	2,727	61.75

Seewis sub-district
Municipality	Population (31 December 2020)	Area (km²)
Seewis im Prättigau	1,376	49.64

The sub-districts Davos, Jenaz, Klosters, Küblis and Luzein belonged until 1986 to the defunct district Oberlandquart; the sub-districts Schiers and Seewis to the defunct district Unterlandquart.

== Mergers ==
On 1 January 2016 the former municipality of Saas im Prättigau merged into Klosters-Serneus.

== Languages ==
Languages of Prättigau/Davos District, GR
Languages	Census 2000	
Languages	Number	Percent
German	23,492	89.9%
Romansh	285	1.1%
Italian	452	1.7%
TOTAL	26,130	100%
