= St. Antönien Ascharina =

- Former municipality
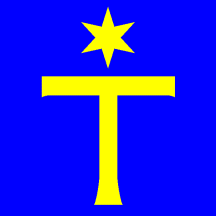
- Flag Coat of arms
- Location of St. Antönien Ascharina
- Location within Switzerland Location within Canton of Graubünden
- Coordinates: 46°58′N 9°48′E
- Country: Switzerland
- Canton: Graubünden
- District: Prättigau/Davos

Area
  - Total: 49.63 km^{2} (19.16 sq mi)
- Elevation: 937 m (3,074 ft)

Population (2005)
  - Total: 1,390
  - Density: 28.0/km^{2} (72.5/sq mi)
- Time zone: UTC+01:00 (CET)
  - Summer (DST): UTC+02:00 (CEST)
- Postal code: 7212
- SFOS number: 3892
- ISO 3166 code: CH-GR
- Surrounded by: Küblis, Luzein, Saas im Prättigau, Sankt Antönien
- Website

St. Antönien Ascharina is a former municipality in the Swiss canton of Graubünden. Until 1953, the municipality was known as Ascharina.

The municipalities of St. Antönien Ascharina and St. Antönien have voted with a large majority to combine the two municipalities, effective January 1, 2007.

The municipality is German-speaking.
