= Anita Hansemann =

Swiss social worker and writer (1962–2019)

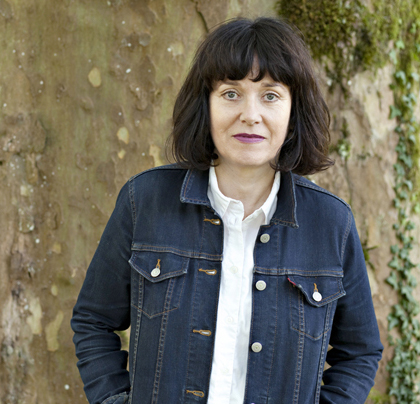
- Born: 20 November 1962; Saas im Prättigau
- Died: 28 June 2019 (aged 56); Zürich
- Occupations: social worker and writer

Anita Hansemann (20 November 1962 – 28 June 2019) was a Swiss social worker and writer. She has authored books, plays, and a libretto for an opera.

== Life ==
Hansemann was born in Saas in 1962 and she was brought up in the mountain village of Prättigau. She moved to Zurich when she was 22 and began a career in social work. She was involved in management but eventually she gave in to an urge to write. She took a course in writing and at the end of it her play was lauded although Hansemann says it was not very good. She began to write, one story was based on folk stories based around her childhood home of Prättigau.

In 2011 she was contacted by Robert Grossmann, a composer who proposed that they should write an opera together. He was to write the music and he wanted Hansemann to write the libretto. She had never done anything like this but within two months they also had the support of Chur theatre and the director Achim Lenz. Her opera Bergpiraten (Mountain Pirates), like the work of Bertold Brecht, draws on the Beggars Opera of 1728. It has a theme documenting how capitalism can beat nature, but the story also entertained.

In 2018 she published "Widerschien".

Hansemann died in Zürich in 2019 after a traffic accident.

== Works ==
- Die weisse Wölfin (The white she-wolf), Swiss Youth Writings Agency, Zurich 2008.
- Bergpiraten (Mountain pirates), Music theater, premiere at Theater Chur, 2015.
- Widerschien (Reflection), novel, edition büchlese, Lucerne 2018.
- Kati, die Möwe (Kati the seagull), children's book, Atlantis Verlag, Zurich 2018. Illustrations Verena Pavoni.
