= Sulzfluh =

Mountain in Switzerland

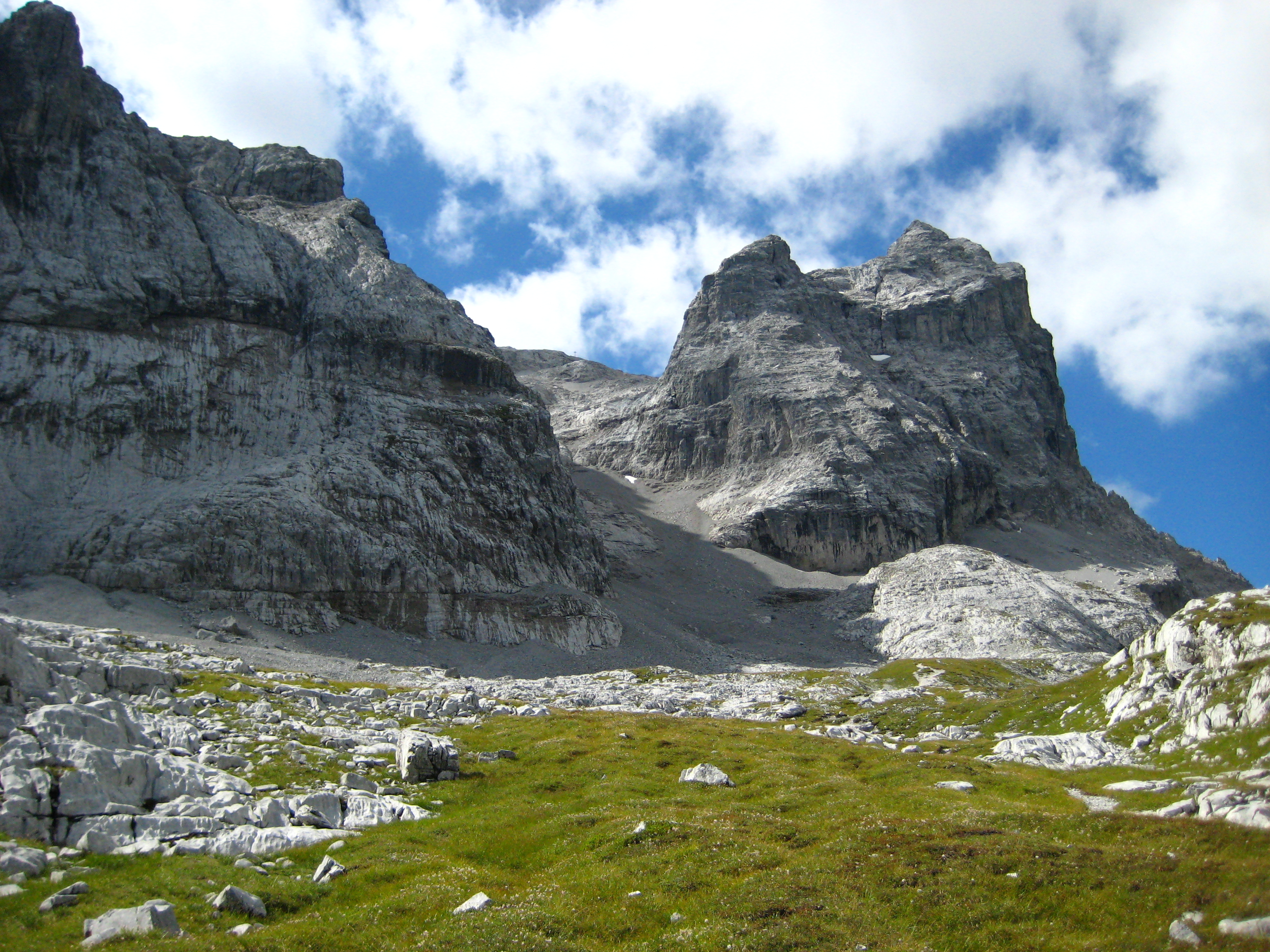
- Sulzfluh, from the northwest.

Highest point
- Elevation: 2,817 m (9,242 ft)
- Prominence: 475 m (1,558 ft)
- Parent peak: Drusenfluh
- Listing: Alpine mountains 2500-2999 m
- Coordinates: 47°0′45.4″N 9°50′21.7″E

Geography
- Location within Alps
- Location: Graubünden, Switzerland; Vorarlberg, Austria
- Parent range: Rätikon

Climbing
- First ascent: 1782
- Easiest route: Mountain path on eastern face

The Sulzfluh is a mountain in the Rätikon range of the Alps, located on the border between Austria and Switzerland. The closest locality is St. Antönien, on the southern side.

Below the north face of the mountain is the Lindauer Hütte, a mountain refuge at 1,744 m (5,722 ft) in the Gau valley.

The eastern side has a mountain path of grade T4, allowing non-climbers to reach the summit at 2,817 m (9,242 ft). This is part of a multi day walking route along the entire length of the Rätikon chain on the sunnier side, called "Prättigauer Höhenweg".

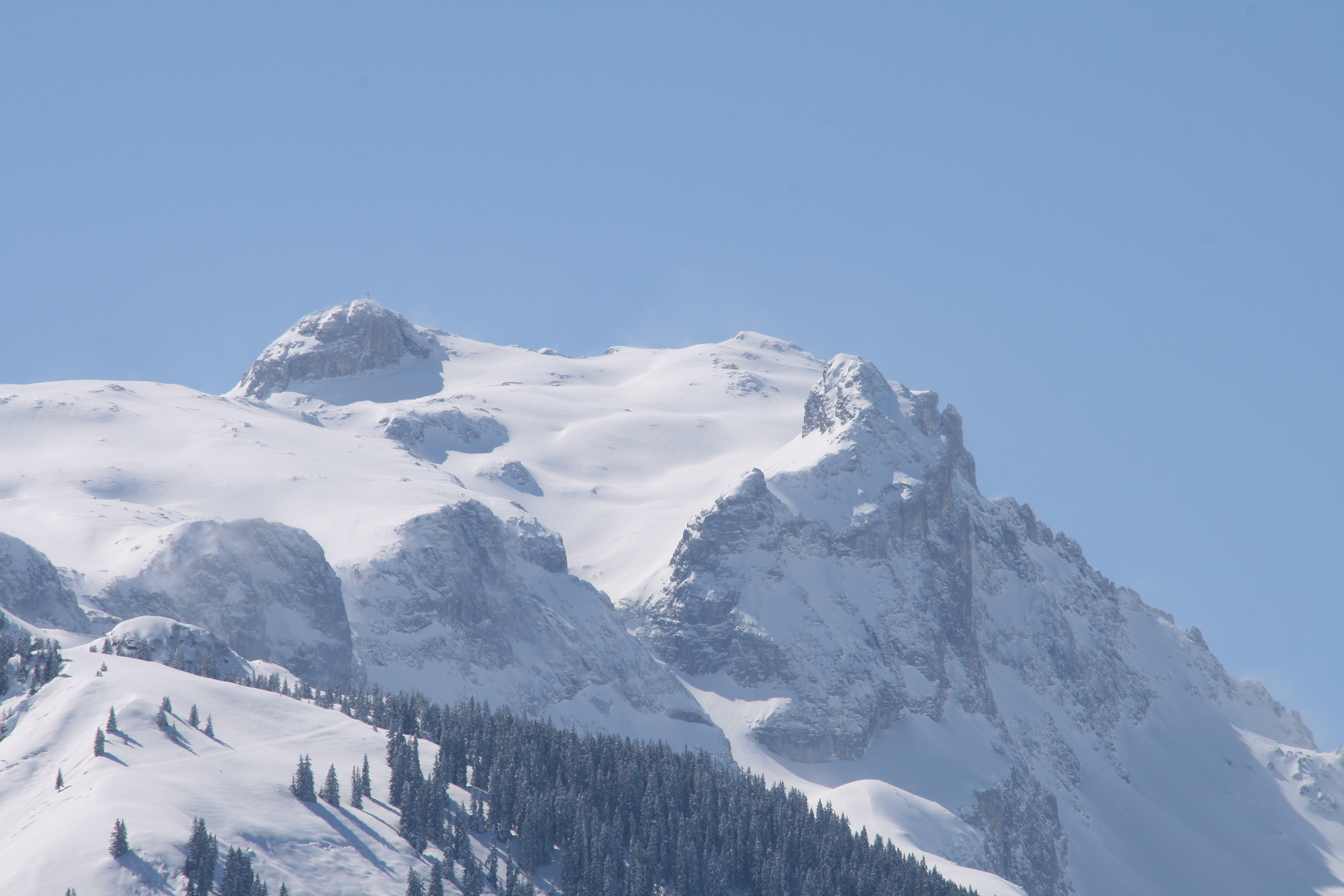
Sulzfluh on the northern (Austrian) side.

There are six known caves into the limestone mountain, with lengths ranging from 800 to 3000 or more metres. It is well known by climbers, the Gauablickhöhle Via ferrata on the north (Austrian) side involves passing through 350m of the cave system part way up the cliff face, there is another via ferrata on the southern, Swiss face, in Graubünden.

== Geology ==
The Sulzfluh limestone forming the upper slopes of the Sulzfluh is Tithonian in age. The limestone was deposited in shallow water. The unit is only a few hundred metres thick but it is part of the Sulzfluh nappe and when the nappe was formed thrust faulting produced a repetition of the limestone to give a total thickness of about a thousand meters.

On the north (Austrian) side of the mountain a thrust fault separates the Sulzfluh limestone from rocks of the Arosa zone.
