= Conters =

Conters is name of several localities in Switzerland:

- Conters im Prättigau
- Conters im Oberhalbstein, see Cunter, Switzerland
