= St. Antönien =

- Municipality
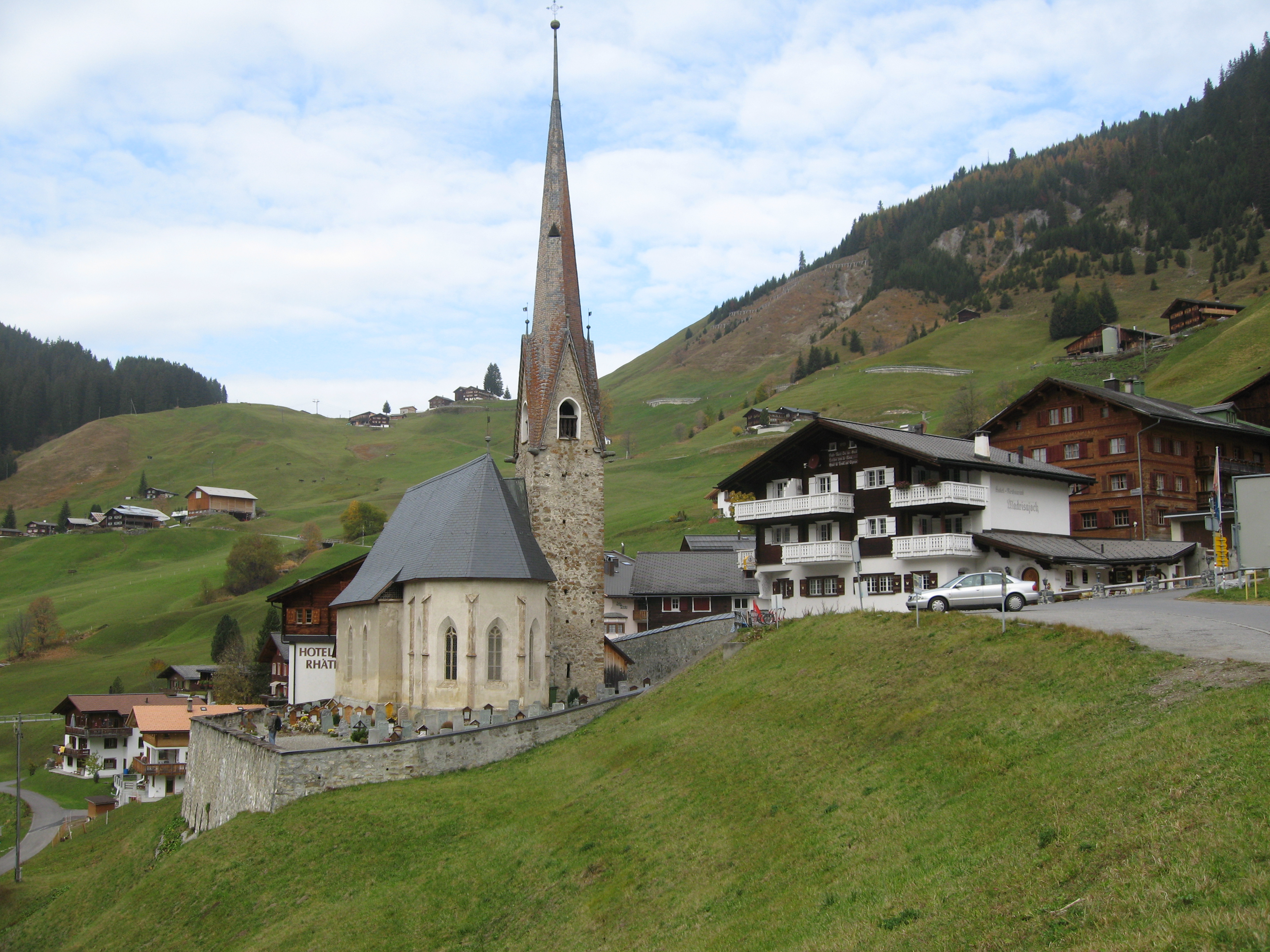

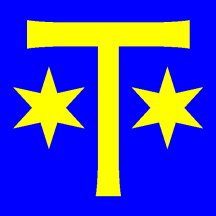
- Flag Coat of arms
- Location of St. Antönien
- Location within Switzerland Location within Canton of Graubünden
- Coordinates: 46°58′N 9°49′E
- Country: Switzerland
- Canton: Graubünden
- District: Prättigau/Davos

Area
  - Total: 42.66 km^{2} (16.47 sq mi)
- Elevation: 1,459 m (4,787 ft)

Population (December 2020)
  - Total: 331
  - Density: 7.76/km^{2} (20.1/sq mi)
- Time zone: UTC+01:00 (CET)
  - Summer (DST): UTC+02:00 (CEST)
- Postal code: 7246
- SFOS number: 3893
- ISO 3166 code: CH-GR
- Localities: Ascharina, Castels, Rüti
- Surrounded by: Küblis, Luzein, Saas im Prättigau, Sankt Gallenkirch (AT-8), Schiers, Tschagguns (AT-8)
- Website: www.luzein.ch

St. Antönien is a Swiss village in the Prättigau and a former municipality in the political district of Prättigau/Davos in the canton of Graubünden.

The municipalities of St. Antönien (242 inhabitants) and St. Antönien Ascharina (118 inhabitants) merged on 1 January 2007 into St. Antönien. Later, on 1 January 2016, it merged with the municipality of Luzein.

== History ==
St. Antönien is first mentioned in 1451 as Sant Anthonyen. Earlier, the area was worked by romansh speaking inhabitants of the lower valleys as the names of the places indicate. Around 1400 Walser people that came from the Klosters area were allowed to settle in the higher areas at the end of the valley. So the Walser settled in the valley top first, advancing to lower areas later. The Walser also brought with them the Valliser style of house, which uses more wood than stone

== Geography ==
St. Antönien has an area, as of 2006, of 52.2 km^{2} (20.2 sq mi) with settlements reaching as high as roughly 1800 meters at Gafia and Partnun. Of this area, 51.6% is used for agricultural purposes, while 11.4% is forested. Of the rest of the land, 0.9% is settled (buildings or roads) and the remainder (36.1%) is non-productive (rivers, glaciers or mountains).

The municipality is located in the Luzein sub-district of the Prättigau/Davos. It consists of the village of St. Antönien which was created in 1979 by the merger of St. Antönien Castels and St. Antönien Rüti. In 2007 St. Antönien Ascharina merged into St. Antönien.

== Tourism ==
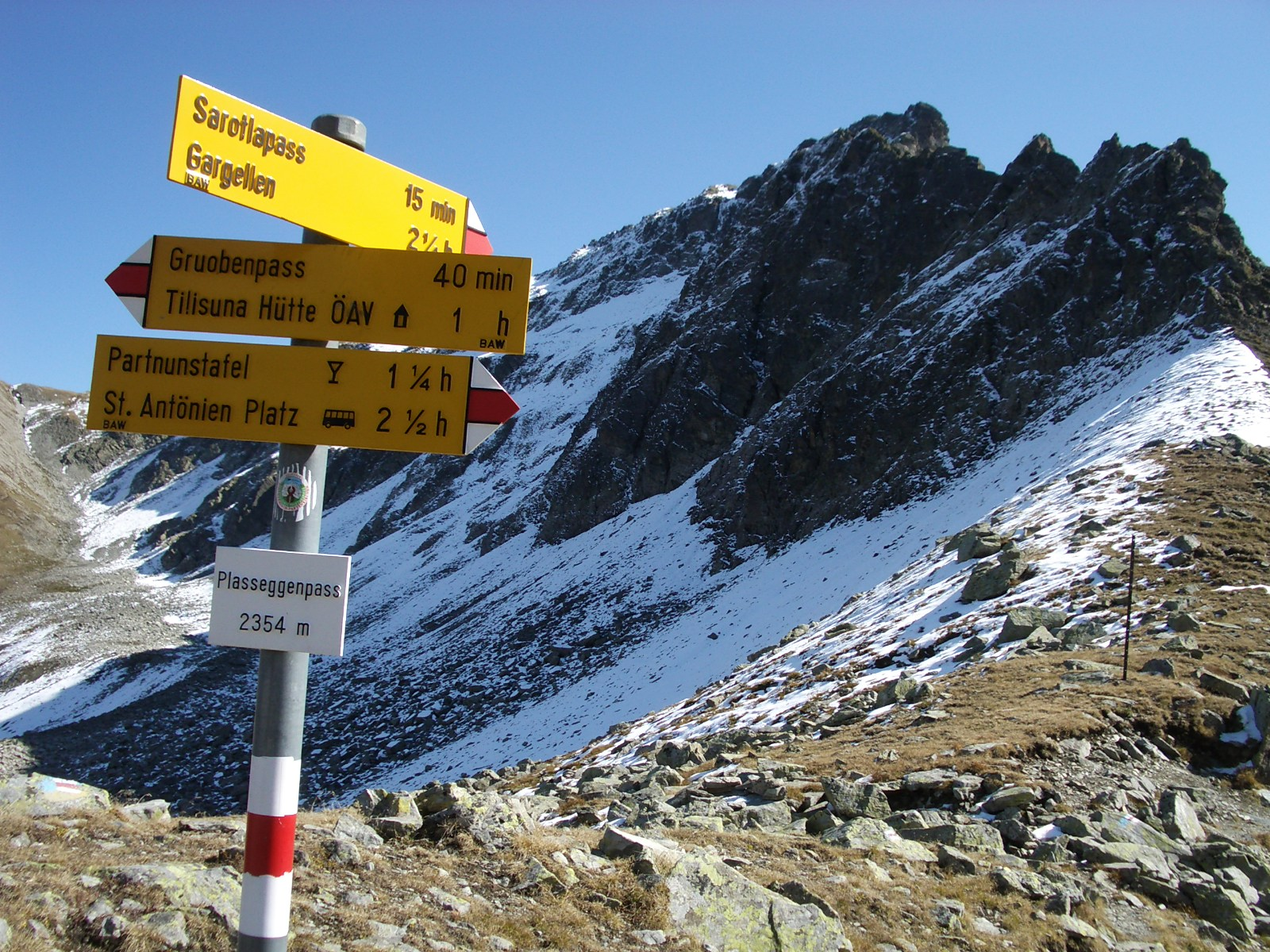
Plasseggen Mountain pass near St. Antönien

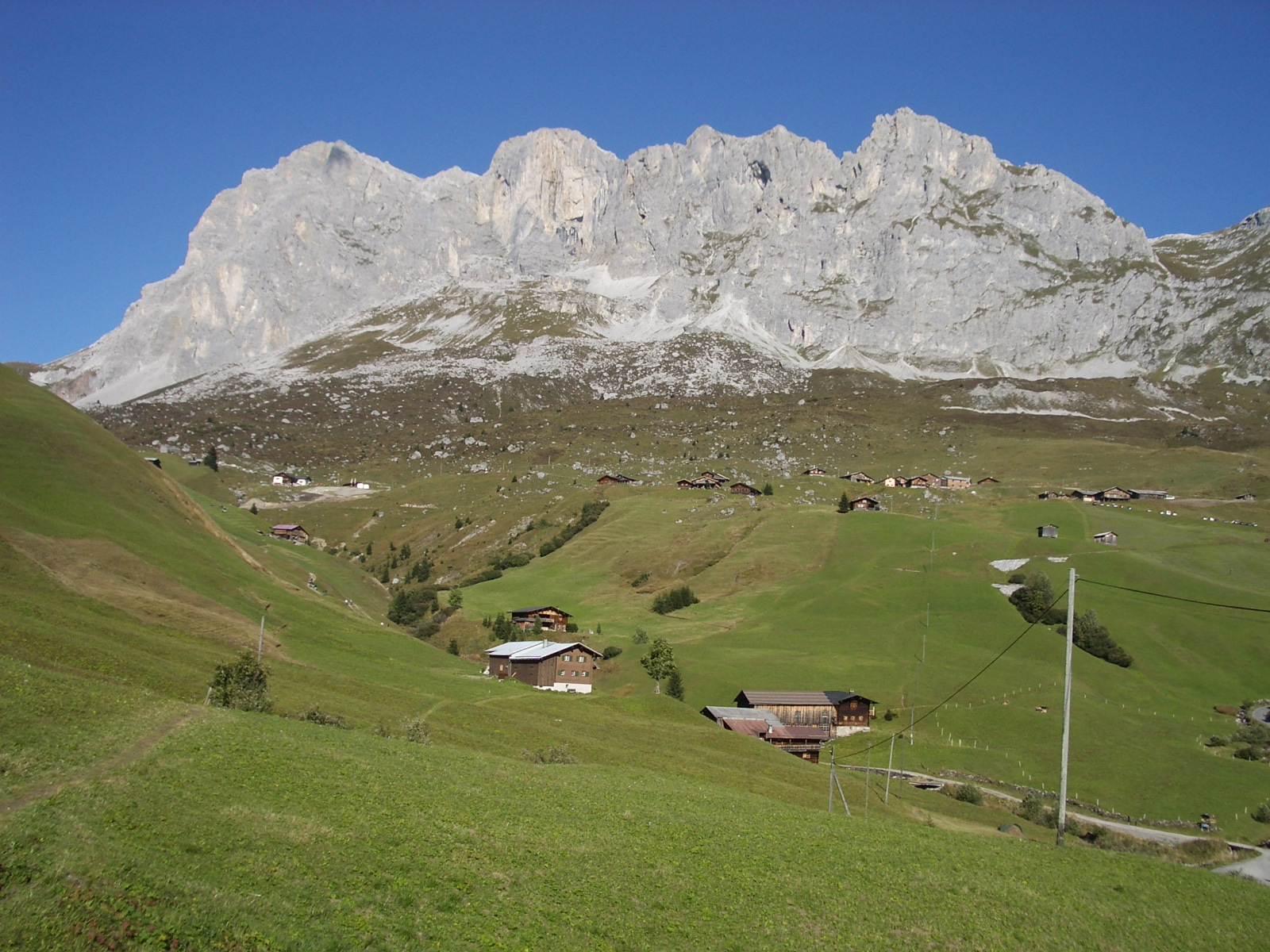
Scheienfluh to the north of the village

The village has been a minor tourism destination since 1891 when 30 to 40 guests stayed in homes that were empty due to the summer pasturing. Today there are hotels and about 20 rental properties with about 500 beds. The Pisten ski slopes opened in 1974 with the construction of the Skilift Junker. In the 1980s there were a record 50,000 lodger-nights per year, while in the 2000s it has dropped to about 30,000. The valley is firstly known for mountain climbing on the limestone peaks of the Rätikon mountain range of which nearby Sulzfluh hosts Via Ferrata in its southern face that was opened in 2005. Non climbers go skiing, ski touring or hiking along the whole of the impressive Rätikon mountains. Even though the first impression from the St. Antönien side would not seem to allow this, it is nevertheless possible to reach some of the summits on mountain paths without climbing.

== Heritage sites of national significance ==
The House with Barn at Berawis 68 is listed as a Swiss heritage site of national significance.

== Demographics ==
St. Antönien has a population (as of 31 December 2020) of 331. As of 2008, 4.0% of the population was made up of foreign nationals. Over the last 10 years the population has decreased at a rate of -0.3%. Most of the population (as of 2000) speaks German (97.7%), with Albanian being second most common ( 1.4%) and Romansh being third ( 0.3%).

As of 2000, the gender distribution of the population was 51.9% male and 48.1% female. The age distribution, as of 2001, in St. Antönien is; 44 children or 19.1% of the population are between 0 and 9 years old and 24 teenagers or 10.4% are between 10 and 19. Of the adult population, 20 people or 8.7% of the population are between 20 and 29 years old. 40 people or 17.4% are between 30 and 39, 30 people or 13.0% are between 40 and 49, and 27 people or 11.7% are between 50 and 59. The senior population distribution is 19 people or 8.3% of the population are between 60 and 69 years old, 24 people or 10.4% are between 70 and 79, there are 2 people or 0.9% who are between 80 and 89.

In the 2007 federal election the most popular party was the SVP which received 58.4% of the vote. The next three most popular parties were the FDP (29.8%), the SP (7.7%) and the local, small right-wing parties (3.1%).

In St. Antönien about 48% of the population (between age 25–64) have completed either non-mandatory upper secondary education or additional higher education (either university or a Fachhochschule).

St. Antönien has an unemployment rate of 0.2%. As of 2005, there were 89 people employed in the primary economic sector and about 34 businesses involved in this sector. 8 people are employed in the secondary sector and there are 3 businesses in this sector. 57 people are employed in the tertiary sector, with 18 businesses in this sector.

The historical population is given in the following table:

Year	Population
1850	224
1900	255
1950	284
1970	229
2000	230
