= Prättigau/Davos Region =

Coordinates: 46°48′N 9°49′E

Prättigau/Davos Region Region Prättigau/Davos (German)
- District
- Country: Switzerland
- Canton: Grisons

Area
  - Total: 853.40 km^{2} (329.50 sq mi)

Population (2020)
  - Total: 26,089
  - Density: 30.571/km^{2} (79.178/sq mi)
- Time zone: UTC+1 (CET)
  - Summer (DST): UTC+2 (CEST)
- Municipalities: 11

Prättigau/Davos Region is one of the eleven administrative districts in the canton of the Grisons in Switzerland. It had an area of 973.65 square kilometers (375.93 sq mi) and a population of 26,089 (as of 31 December 2020). It was created on 1 January 2017 as part of a reorganization of the Canton replacing the Prättigau/Davos District.

== History ==
The Prättigau is a popular tourist destination for winter and summer activities, including downhill and cross country skiing, tobogganing and hiking.

Traditionally, towns in the Prättigau were reliant on the lumber industry, although the income from tourism has largely replaced that.

The historical American Van Leer family claims lineage from this area through Swiss archives.

== Demographics ==
Municipalities in the Prättigau/Davos Region
Municipality	Population (31 December 2020)	Area (km^{2})
Davos	10,832	284
Fideris	595	25.36
Furna	207	33.32
Jenaz	1,147	25.91
Klosters-Serneus	4,416	219.8
Conters im Prättigau	220	18.4
Küblis	891	8.14
Luzein	1,596	83.88
Grüsch	2,115	43.3
Schiers	2,727	61.66
Seewis im Prättigau	1,376	49.63
