= Saas im Prättigau =

- Former municipality
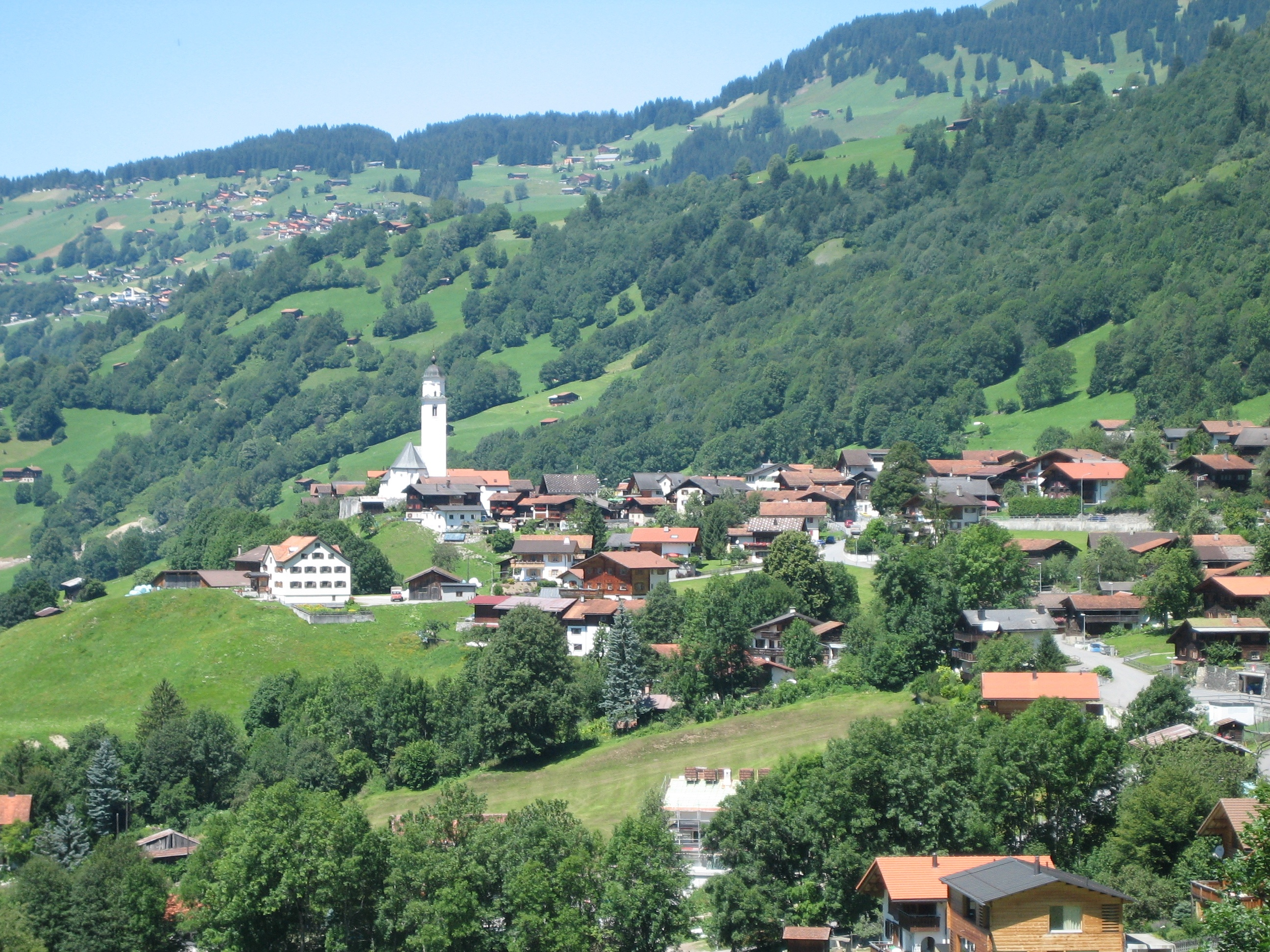

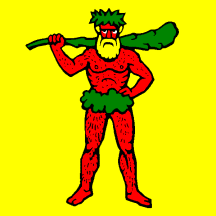
- Flag Coat of arms
- Location of Saas im Prättigau
- Location within Switzerland Location within Canton of Graubünden
- Coordinates: 46°55′N 9°48′E
- Country: Switzerland
- Canton: Graubünden
- District: Prättigau/Davos

Area
  - Total: 26.71 km^{2} (10.31 sq mi)
- Elevation (Church): 988 m (3,241 ft)

Population (December 2020)
  - Total: 729
  - Density: 27.3/km^{2} (70.7/sq mi)
- Time zone: UTC+01:00 (CET)
  - Summer (DST): UTC+02:00 (CEST)
- Postal code: 7247
- SFOS number: 3883
- ISO 3166 code: CH-GR
- Surrounded by: Conters im Prättigau, Klosters-Serneus, Küblis, Luzein, Sankt Gallenkirch (AT-8)
- Website: www.klosters-serneus.ch

Saas im Prättigau is a Swiss village in the Prättigau and a former municipality in the district of Prättigau/Davos in the canton of Graubünden. On 1 January 2016 the former municipality of Saas im Prättigau merged into the municipality of Klosters-Serneus.

== History ==
Saas is first mentioned about 1290 as Säusch.

== Geography ==
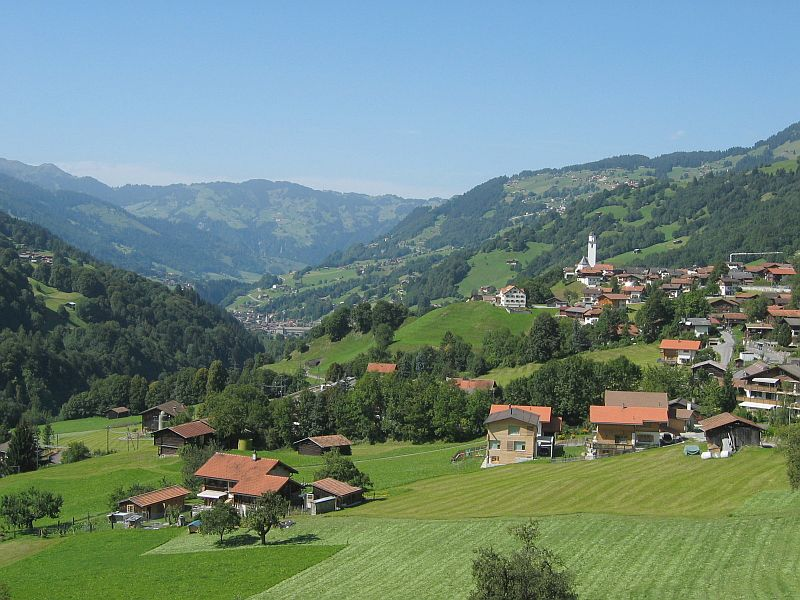
Saas im Prättigau

Aerial view (1954)

Saas has an area, as of 2006, of 26.8 km^{2} (10.3 sq mi). Of this area, 44% is used for agricultural purposes, while 26.2% is forested. Of the rest of the land, 2.1% is settled (buildings or roads) and the remainder (27.7%) is non-productive (rivers, glaciers or mountains).

The municipality is located in the Küblis sub-district of the Prättigau/Davos district. It consists of the linear village of Saas on a terrace over the Prättigau valley, between Küblis and Klosters.

== Neighboring municipalities ==
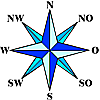
Luzein	Luzein	Austria
Küblis		St. Antönien
Conters im Prättigau	Klosters-Serneus	Klosters-Serneus

== Coat of arms ==
The town coat of arms is described as Or a Wild Man holding over his shoulder a Club Vert. The Wild man motif comes from the seal of the League of the Ten Jurisdictions as well as from Klosters and has been part of the municipality's coat of arms since the 16th Century. The figure is always shown with a club over his shoulder, to prevent confusion with other Wild Men.

== Demographics ==
Saas has a population (as of 31 December 2020) of 729. As of 2008, 10.0% of the population was made up of foreign nationals. Over the last 10 years the population has decreased at a rate of -3.8%. Most of the population (as of 2000) speaks German (97.3%), with Portuguese being second most common ( 1.0%) and Romansh being third ( 0.4%).

As of 2000, the gender distribution of the population was 51.1% male and 48.9% female. The age distribution, as of 2000, in Saas is; 97 children or 13.2% of the population are between 0 and 9 years old and 76 teenagers or 10.4% are between 10 and 19. Of the adult population, 94 people or 12.8% of the population are between 20 and 29 years old. 110 people or 15.0% are between 30 and 39, 97 people or 13.2% are between 40 and 49, and 93 people or 12.7% are between 50 and 59. The senior population distribution is 80 people or 10.9% of the population are between 60 and 69 years old, 56 people or 7.6% are between 70 and 79, there are 26 people or 3.5% who are between 80 and 89 there are 4 people or 0.5% who are between 90 and 99.

In the 2007 federal election the most popular party was the SVP which received 54.7% of the vote. The next three most popular parties were the FDP (24.2%), the SP (10.5%) and the local, small right-wing parties (7.1%).

In Saas about 71.3% of the population (between age 25–64) have completed either non-mandatory upper secondary education or additional higher education (either university or a Fachhochschule).

Saas has an unemployment rate of 0.77%. As of 2005, there were 66 people employed in the primary economic sector and about 26 businesses involved in this sector. 51 people are employed in the secondary sector and there are 11 businesses in this sector. 84 people are employed in the tertiary sector, with 26 businesses in this sector.

The historical population is given in the following table:

year	population
1838	684
1850	469
1888	657
1900	431
1950	567
1990	620
