= Schiers =

- Municipality
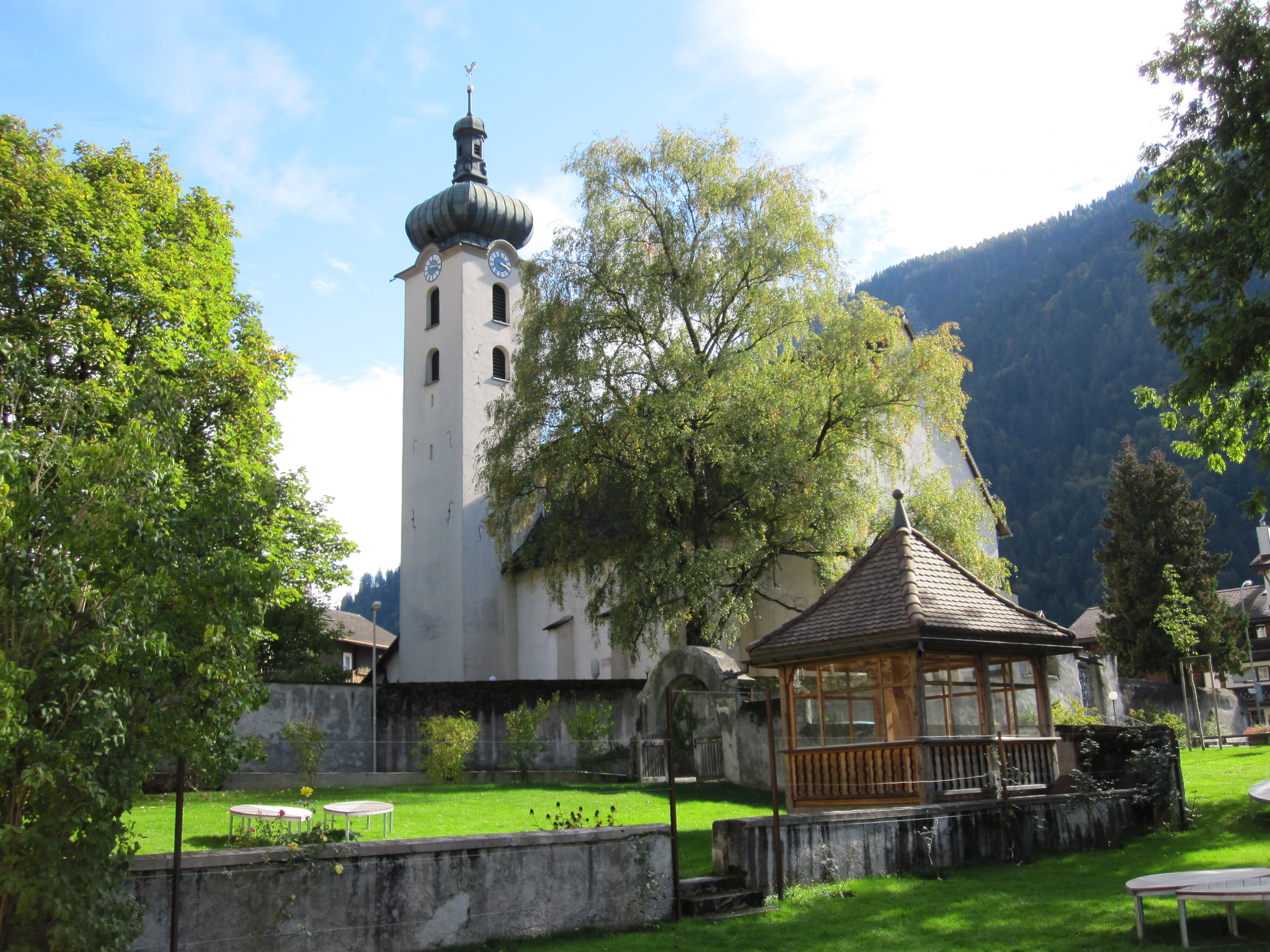

- Flag Coat of arms
- Location of Schiers
- Location within Switzerland Location within Canton of Grisons
- Coordinates: 46°58′N 9°41′E
- Country: Switzerland
- Canton: Grisons
- District: Prättigau/Davos

Government
  - Mayor: Mathis-Müller Joos

Area
  - Total: 61.66 km^{2} (23.81 sq mi)
- Elevation: 660 m (2,170 ft)

Population (December 2020)
  - Total: 2,727
  - Density: 44.23/km^{2} (114.5/sq mi)
- Time zone: UTC+01:00 (CET)
  - Summer (DST): UTC+02:00 (CEST)
- Postal code: 7220
- SFOS number: 3962
- ISO 3166 code: CH-GR
- Surrounded by: Fanas, Furna, Grüsch, Jenaz, Luzein, Sankt Antönien, Seewis im Prättigau, Tschagguns (AT-8), Vandans (AT-8)
- Website: www.schiers.ch

Schiers (German pronunciation: [ˈʃiːɐs]) is a Swiss village in the Prättigau and a municipality in the political district Prättigau/Davos Region in the canton of the Grisons. The first concrete girder bridge ever built, Salginatobel Bridge, is located in Schiers. Designed by Robert Maillart and completed in 1930, in 1991 it was the first concrete bridge to be designated an International Historic Civil Engineering Landmark by the American Society of Civil Engineers.

== History ==
Schiers is first mentioned in 1101 A.D. as Scieres.

== Geography ==
Aerial view from 300 m by Walter Mittelholzer (1923)

Schiers has an area, as of 2006, of 61.8 km^{2} (23.9 sq mi). Of this area, 36.5% is used for agricultural purposes, while 44.3% is forested. Of the rest of the land, 2.1% is settled (buildings or roads) and the remainder (17.1%) is non-productive (rivers, glaciers or mountains).

Before 2017, the municipality was located in the Schiers sub-district of the Prättigau/Davos district on the border with Austria. The highest point is the Drusenfluh at 2,828 m (9,278 ft). It is located in the lower Prättigau valley at the mouth of the Schraubach. It is the center of the middle and outer Prättigau valley. It consists of the linear village of Schiers and the hamlet of Tersier in the valley and the settlements of Lunden, Fajauna-Stels, Maria-Montagna, Pusserein as well as Schuders on the south slope of the valley. In 1875, the hamlet of Sigg left Schiers for the municipality of Valzeina.

== Demographics ==
Schiers has a population (as of 31 December 2020) of 2,727. As of 2008, 12.0% of the population was made up of foreign nationals. Over the last 10 years the population has grown at a rate of 3.2%. Most of the population (as of 2000) speaks German (89.6%), with Serbo-Croatian being second most common ( 2.1%) and Italian being third ( 1.6%).

As of 2000, the gender distribution of the population was 50.2% male and 49.8% female. The age distribution, as of 2000, in Schiers is; 339 children or 12.9% of the population are between 0 and 9 years old and 421 teenagers or 16.0% are between 10 and 19. Of the adult population, 289 people or 11.0% of the population are between 20 and 29 years old. 405 people or 15.4% are between 30 and 39, 377 people or 14.3% are between 40 and 49, and 262 people or 9.9% are between 50 and 59. The senior population distribution is 208 people or 7.9% of the population are between 60 and 69 years old, 183 people or 6.9% are between 70 and 79, there are 124 people or 4.7% who are between 80 and 89 there are 29 people or 1.1% who are between 90 and 99.

In the 2007 federal election, the most popular party was the SVP which received 39.1% of the vote. The next three most popular parties were the FDP (32.4%), the SP (20.4%) and the local, small right-wing parties (4.4%).

In Schiers about 66.5% of the population (between age 25-64) have completed either non-mandatory upper secondary education or additional higher education (either university or a Fachhochschule).

Schiers has an unemployment rate of 1%. As of 2005, there were 130 people employed in the primary economic sector and about 56 businesses involved in this sector. 333 people are employed in the secondary sector and there are 29 businesses in this sector. 850 people are employed in the tertiary sector, with 87 businesses in this sector.

From the 2000 census, 389 or 14.8% are Roman Catholic, while 1,755 or 66.6% belonged to the Swiss Reformed Church. Of the rest of the population, there are fewer than five individuals who belong to the Christian Catholic faith; there are 28 individuals (or about 1.06% of the population) who belong to the Orthodox Church; and there are 58 individuals (or about 2.20% of the population) who belong to another Christian church. There are 135 (or about 5.12% of the population) who are Islamic. There are 36 individuals (or about 1.37% of the population) who belong to another church (not listed on the census), 149 (or about 5.65% of the population) belong to no church, are agnostic or atheist, and 87 individuals (or about 3.30% of the population) did not answer the question.

The historical population is given in the following table:

Historical population
Year	1780	1850	1900	1950	1990	2000
Pop.	1,110	1,741	1,654	2,312	2,400	2,637
±%	—	+56.8%	−5.0%	+39.8%	+3.8%	+9.9%

== Heritage sites of national significance ==
The Salginatobel Bridge is listed as a Swiss heritage site of national significance.

The Salginatobel Bridge is a reinforced concrete arch bridge designed by renowned Swiss civil engineer Robert Maillart. It was constructed across an alpine valley in Schiers between 1929 and 1930. In 1991, it was declared an International Historic Civil Engineering Landmark, the thirteenth such structure and the first concrete bridge so dedicated.

As with Maillart's Schwandbach Bridge and Vessy Bridge, the structure's fame among civil engineers is a consequence of the techniques involved and the elegance of its design rather than its prominent location: it serves a town of under a thousand people.

Salginatobel Bridge

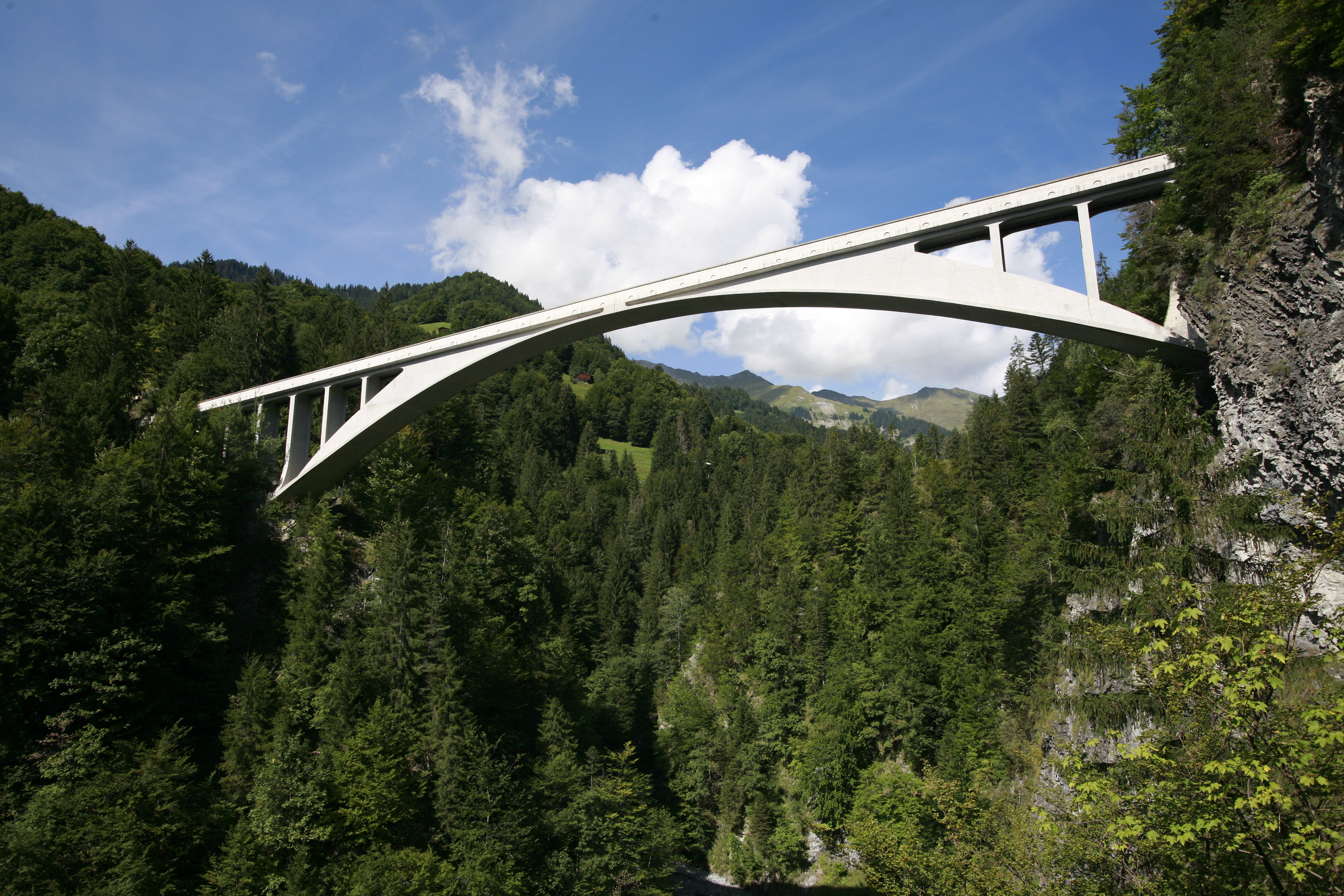
The bridge

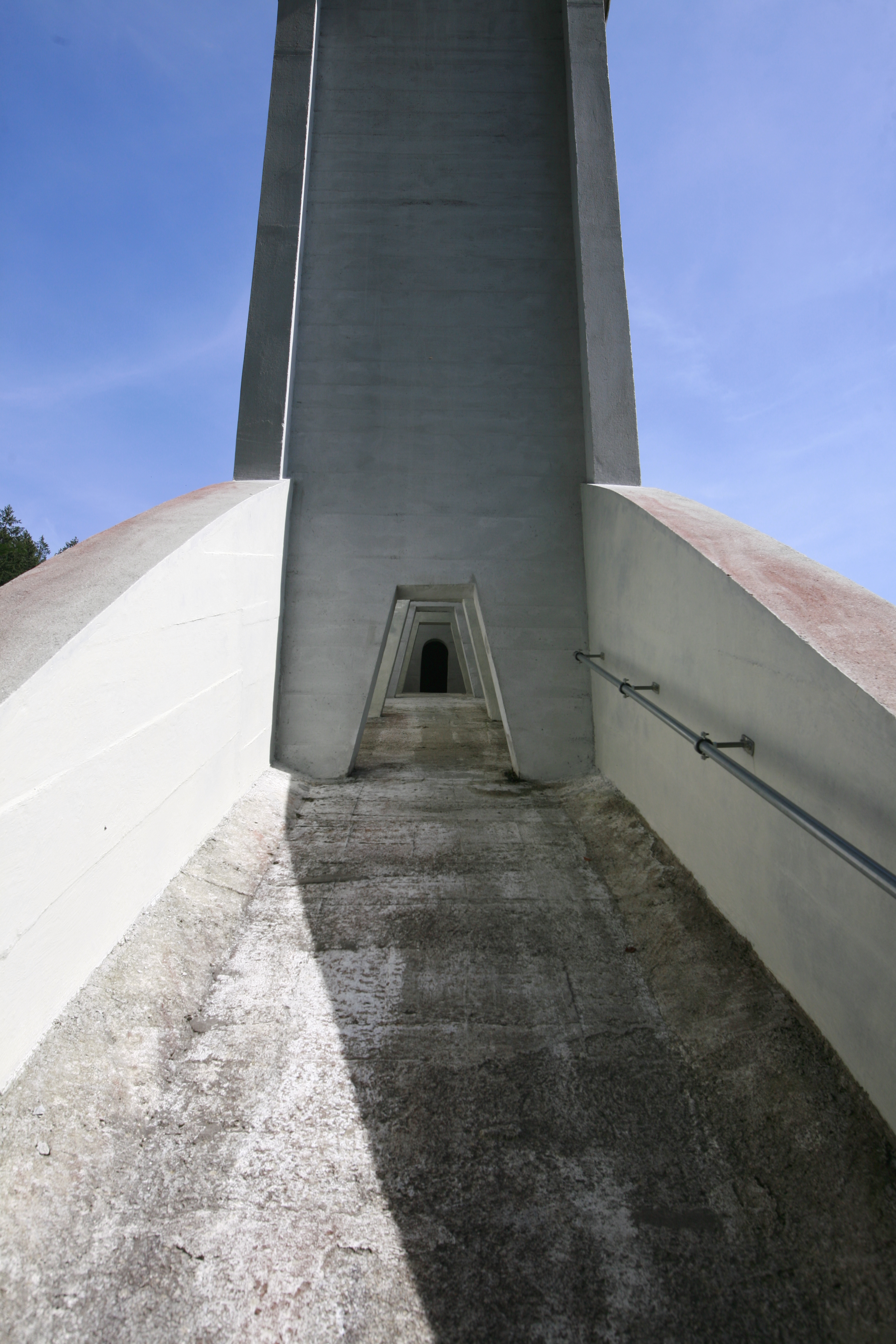
Concrete arch under the bridge

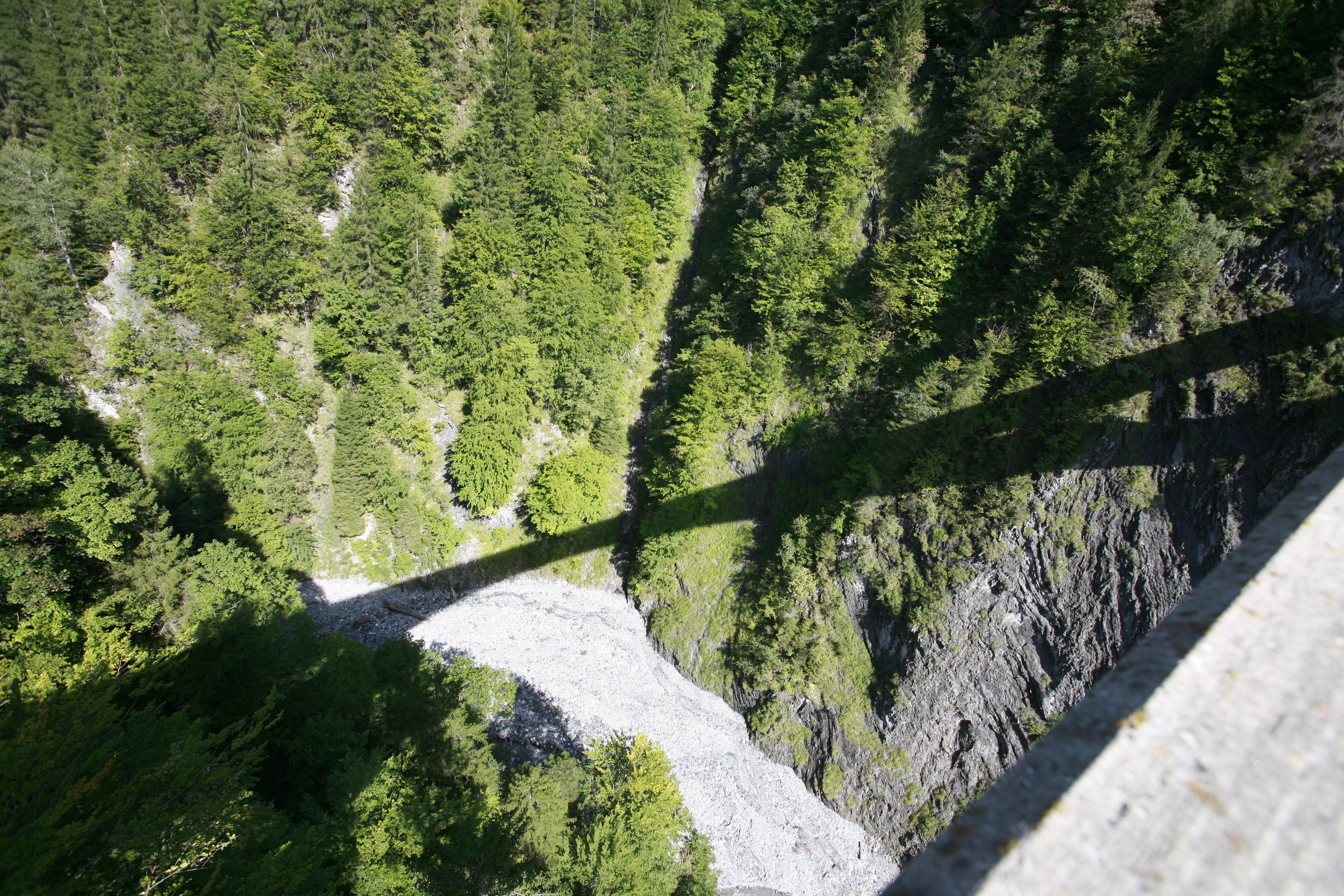
View from the bridge into the canyon

== Transportation ==
The municipality has a railway station, Schiers, on the Landquart–Davos Platz line. It has regular service to Disentis/Mustér, Scuol-Tarasp, Landquart, St. Moritz, and Davos Platz.
