= Küblis =

- Municipality
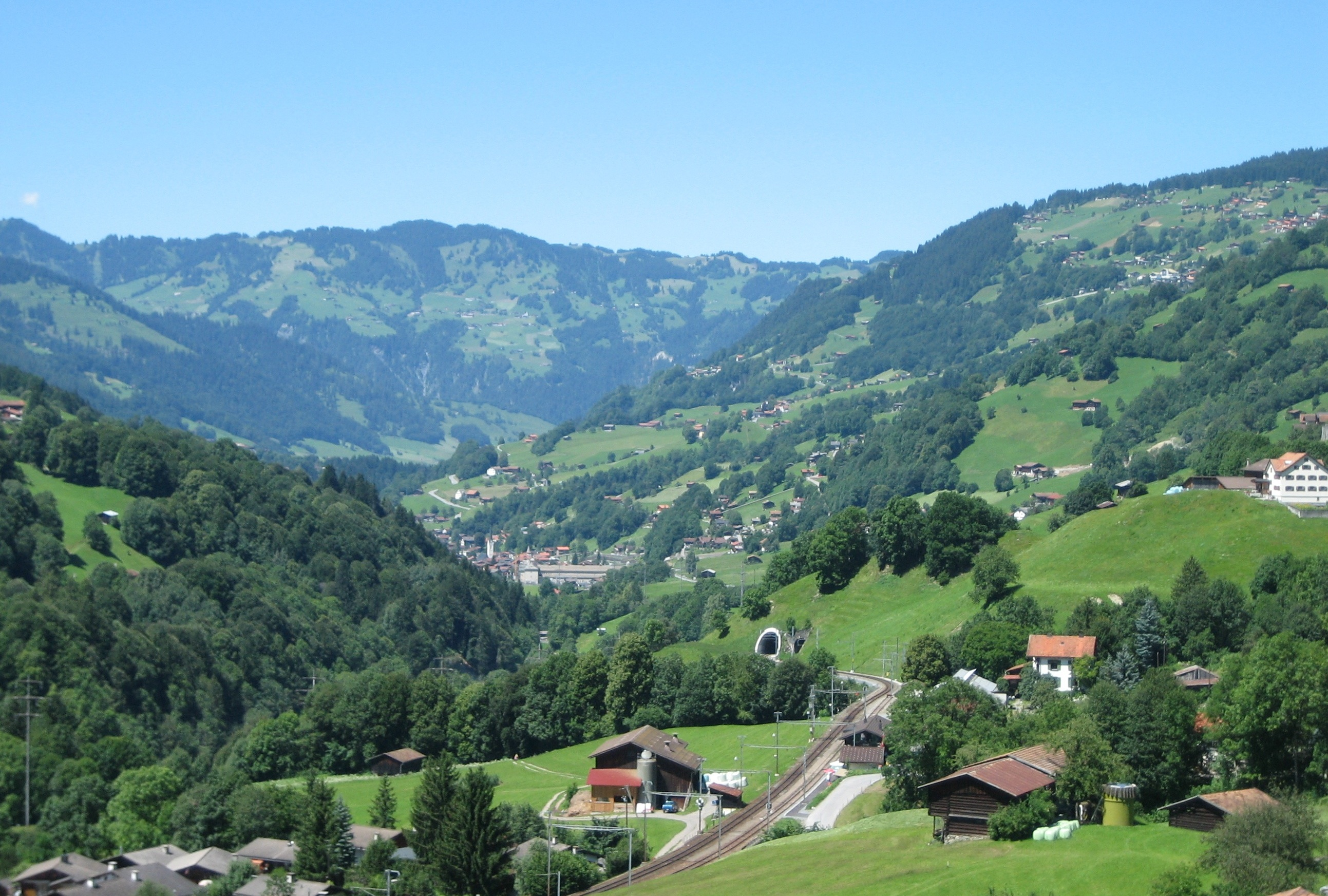

- Flag Coat of arms
- Location of Küblis
- Location within Switzerland Location within Canton of Grisons
- Coordinates: 46°54′N 9°46′E
- Country: Switzerland
- Canton: Grisons
- District: Prättigau/Davos

Government
  - Mayor: Urs Zweifel

Area
  - Total: 8.14 km^{2} (3.14 sq mi)
- Elevation: 814 m (2,671 ft)

Population (December 2020)
  - Total: 891
  - Density: 109/km^{2} (283/sq mi)
- Time zone: UTC+01:00 (CET)
  - Summer (DST): UTC+02:00 (CEST)
- Postal code: 7240
- SFOS number: 3882
- ISO 3166 code: CH-GR
- Surrounded by: Conters im Prättigau, Fideris, Luzein, Saas im Prättigau, Sankt Antönien
- Website: www.kueblis.ch

Küblis or Kublis is a Swiss village in the Prättigau and a municipality in the political district Prättigau/Davos Region in the canton of the Grisons.

== Neighboring municipalities ==
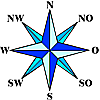
Luzein	St. Antönien	St. Antönien
Luzein		Saas im Prättigau
	Conters im Prättigau	Saas im Prättigau

== History ==
Küblis is first mentioned in 1351 as ze Cüblins. In 1389 it was mentioned as Kúblis.

== Geography ==
Aerial view (1954)

Küblis has an area, as of 2006, of 8.1 km^{2} (3.1 sq mi). Of this area, 44% is used for agricultural purposes, while 42.4% is forested. Of the rest of the land, 4.9% is settled (buildings or roads) and the remainder (8.6%) is non-productive (rivers, glaciers or mountains).

Before 2017, the municipality was located in the Küblis sub-district of the Prättigau/Davos district, after 2017 it was part of the Prättigau/Davos Region. It is in located in the Prättigau valley at the branching of the road to St. Antönien, Conters and Fideris/Jenaz. It consists of the linear village of Küblis and the hamlets of Prada, Tälfsch and Pläviggin.

== Demographics ==
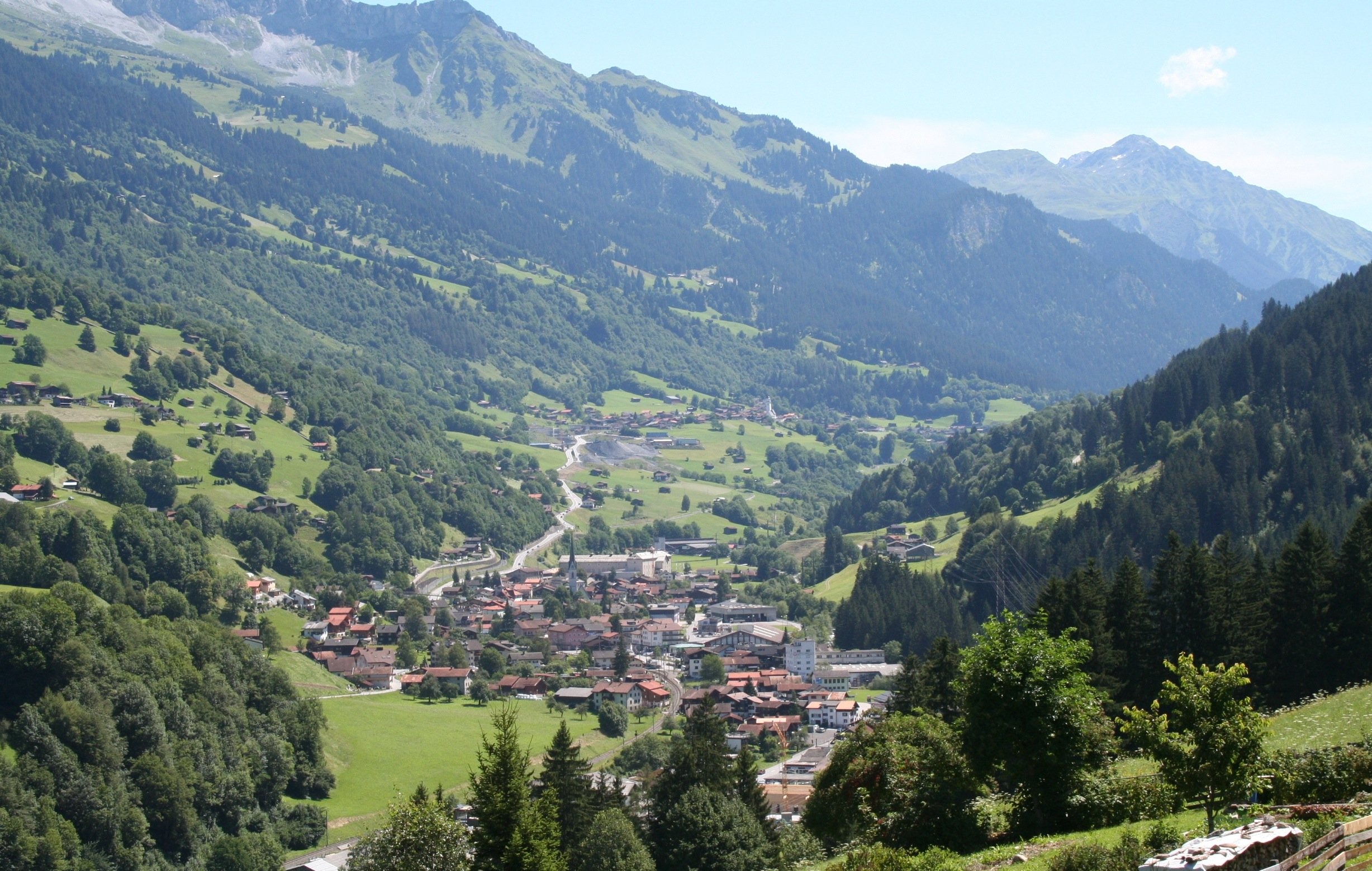
Küblis village in the Prättigau valley

Küblis has a population (as of 31 December 2020) of 891. As of 2008, 15.4% of the population was made up of foreign nationals. Over the last 10 years the population has decreased at a rate of -2%. Most of the population (as of 2000) speaks German (93.5%), with Albanian being second most common ( 2.7%) and Italian being third ( 1.3%).

As of 2000, the gender distribution of the population was 49.6% male and 50.4% female. The age distribution, as of 2000, in Küblis is; 128 children or 15.4% of the population are between 0 and 9 years old and 107 teenagers or 12.9% are between 10 and 19. Of the adult population, 93 people or 11.2% of the population are between 20 and 29 years old. 135 people or 16.3% are between 30 and 39, 108 people or 13.0% are between 40 and 49, and 91 people or 11.0% are between 50 and 59. The senior population distribution is 75 people or 9.0% of the population are between 60 and 69 years old, 58 people or 7.0% are between 70 and 79, there are 31 people or 3.7% who are between 80 and 89 there are 4 people or 0.5% who are between 90 and 99.

In the 2007 federal election the most popular party was the FDP which received 41.5% of the vote. The next three most popular parties were the SVP (40.1%), the SP (13.3%) and the local, small right-wing parties (3.8%).

The entire Swiss population is generally well educated. In Küblis about 68.1% of the population (between age 25-64) have completed either non-mandatory upper secondary education or additional higher education (either university or a Fachhochschule).

Küblis has an unemployment rate of 0.84%. As of 2005, there were 39 people employed in the primary economic sector and about 15 businesses involved in this sector. 166 people are employed in the secondary sector and there are 17 businesses in this sector. 299 people are employed in the tertiary sector, with 58 businesses in this sector.

The historical population is given in the following table:

year	population
1850	455
1900	416
1950	716
2000	830

== Heritage sites of national significance ==
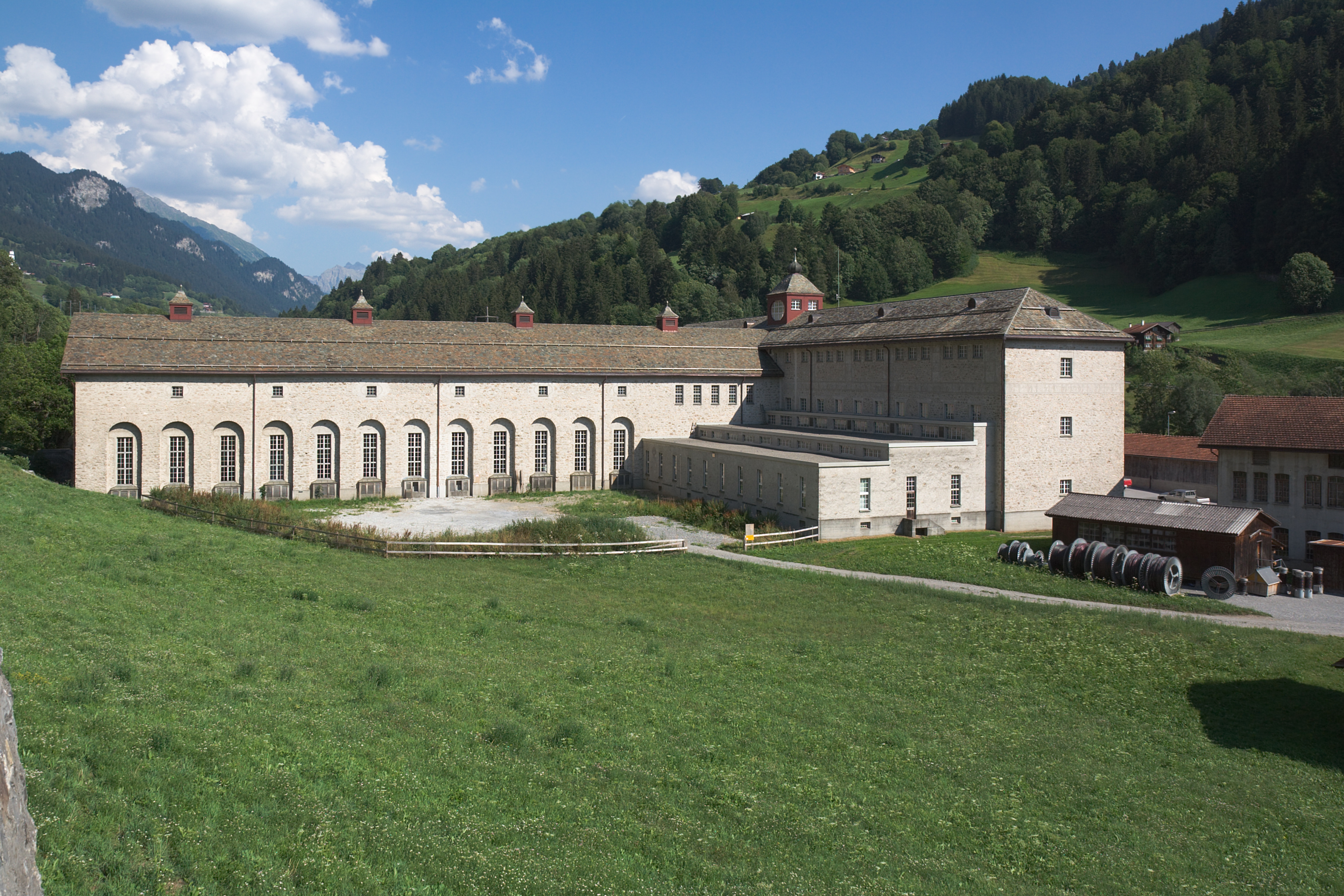
Powerplant in Küblis

The Zentrale Küblis der Bündner Kraftwerke (Central Powerplant in Küblis) is listed as a Swiss heritage site of national significance.

== Transportation ==
The municipality has a railway station, Küblis, on the Landquart–Davos Platz line. It has regular service to Disentis/Mustér, Scuol-Tarasp, Landquart, St. Moritz, and Davos Platz.

== Weather ==
Küblis has an average of 132 days of rain per year and on average receives 1,116 mm (43.9 in) of precipitation. The wettest month is August during which time Küblis receives an average of 127 mm (5.0 in) of precipitation. During this month there is precipitation for an average of 13.2 days. The month with the most days of precipitation is June, with an average of 13.2, but with only 118 mm (4.6 in) of precipitation. The driest month of the year is October with an average of 66 mm (2.6 in) of precipitation over 13.2 days.
