= Fideris =

- Municipality
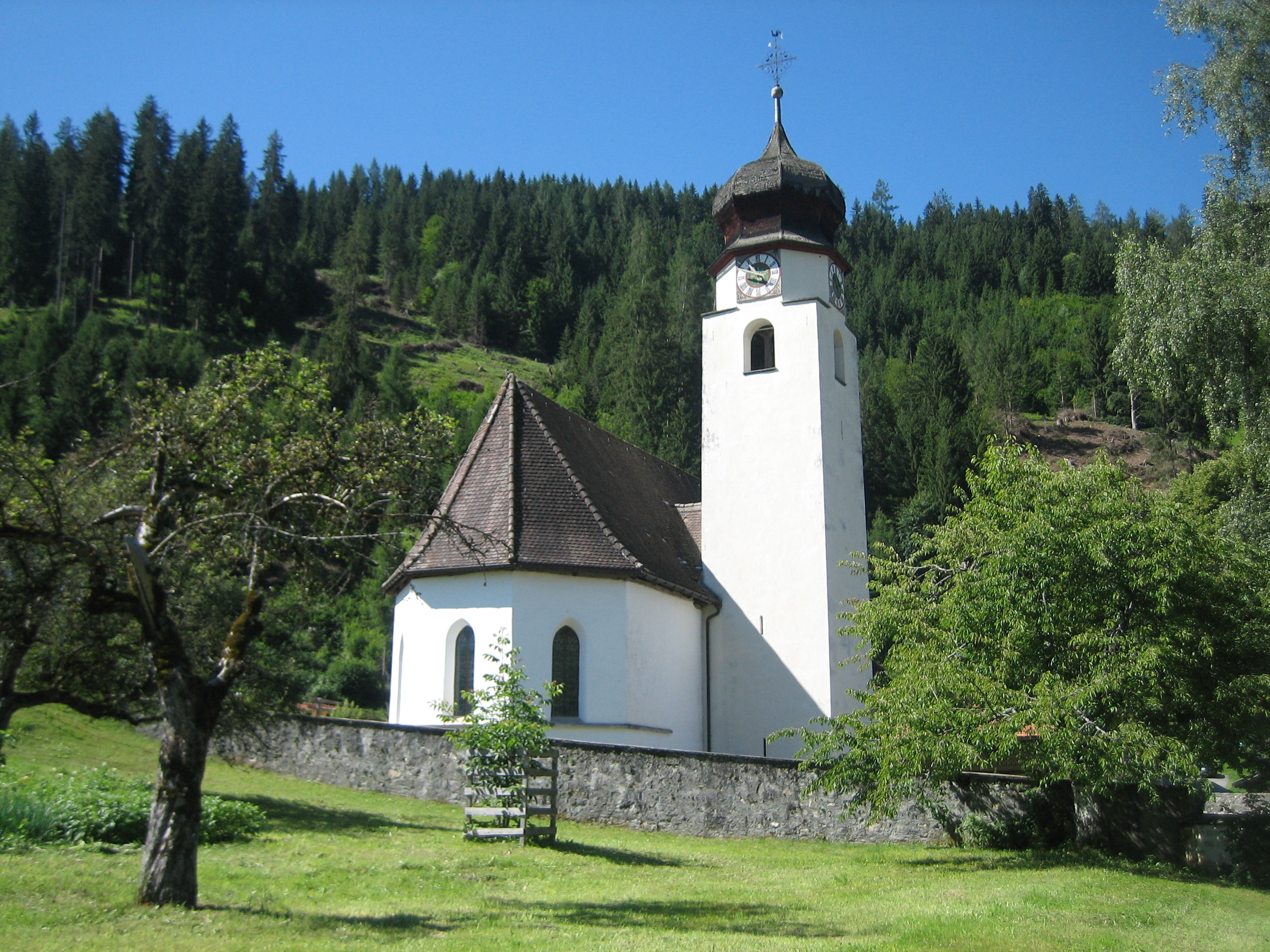
- Fideris village church

- Flag Coat of arms
- Location of Fideris
- Location within Switzerland Location within Canton of Grisons
- Coordinates: 46°54′N 9°44′E
- Country: Switzerland
- Canton: Grisons
- District: Prättigau/Davos

Government
  - Mayor: Reto Lippuner

Area
  - Total: 25.36 km^{2} (9.79 sq mi)
- Elevation: 897 m (2,943 ft)

Population (December 2015)
  - Total: 600
  - Density: 24/km^{2} (61/sq mi)
- Time zone: UTC+01:00 (CET)
  - Summer (DST): UTC+02:00 (CEST)
- Postal code: 7235
- SFOS number: 3861
- ISO 3166 code: CH-GR
- Surrounded by: Conters im Prättigau, Jenaz, Küblis, Langwies, Luzein, Peist
- Website: www.fideris.ch

Fideris (Romansh: Fadrein) is a Swiss village in the Prättigau and a municipality in the political district Prättigau/Davos Region in the canton of the Grisons.

== History ==
Fideris is first mentioned in 1370 as Fidris.

== Geography ==
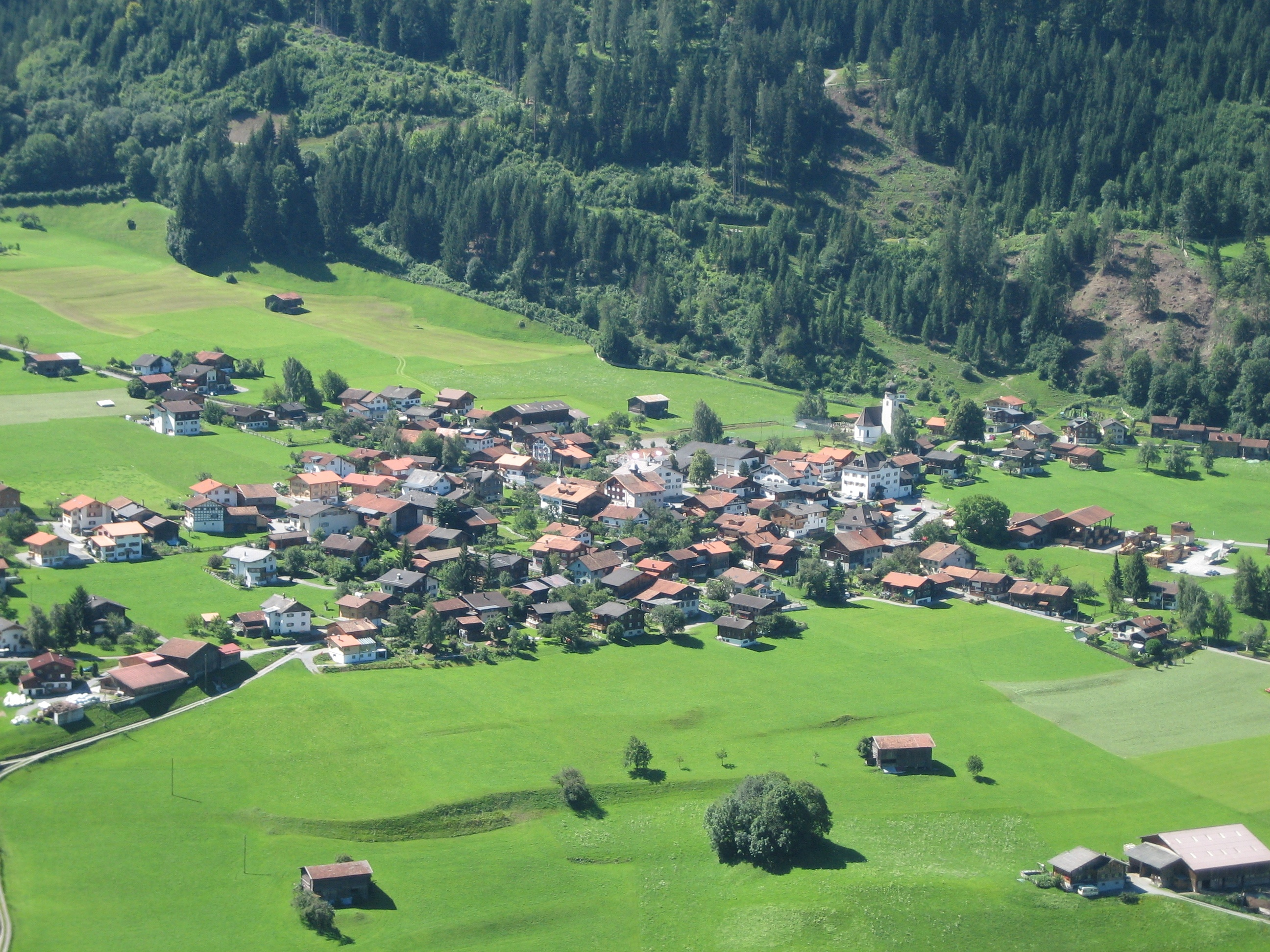
Fideris from the air, showing the village's cross shape

Aerial view (1954)

Fideris has an area, (as of the 2004/09 survey) of 25.36 km^{2} (9.79 sq mi). Of this area, about 58.7% is used for agricultural purposes, while 28.8% is forested. Of the rest of the land, 3.1% is settled (buildings or roads) and 9.4% is unproductive land. In the 2004/09 survey a total of 33 hectares (82 acres) or about 1.3% of the total area was covered with buildings. Of the agricultural land, 138 ha (340 acres) is fields and grasslands and 1,435 ha (3,550 acres) consists of alpine grazing areas. Since 1985 the amount of agricultural land has decreased by 65 ha (160 acres). Over the same time period the amount of forested land has increased by 65 ha (160 acres). Rivers and lakes cover 39 ha (96 acres) in the municipality.

Before 2017, the municipality was located in the Jenaz sub-district of the Prättigau/Davos district, after 2017 it was part of the Prättigau/Davos Region. It is a cross shaped linear village which lies on the Prättigau-Schanfigg route. It consists of the village of Fideris which is made up of the sections of Strahlegg and Fideris-Au.

In 1994, devotees of the Skanda Vale spiritual community in Wales bought a chalet near Fideris, and in 2016 this was inaugurated as a temple in its own right, now called Somaskanda Ashram. This temple draws pilgrims and devotees from across Europe.

== Demographics ==
Fideris has a population (as of December 2020) of 595. As of 2014, 7.2% of the population are resident foreign nationals. Over the last 4 years (2010–2014) the population has changed at a rate of −4.24%. The birth rate in the municipality, in 2014, was 8.5, while the death rate was 5.1 per thousand residents.

As of 2014, children and teenagers (0–19 years old) make up 19.4% of the population, while adults (20–64 years old) are 60.3% of the population and seniors (over 64 years old) make up 20.3%. In 2015 there were 259 single residents, 270 people who were married or in a civil partnership, 42 widows or widowers and 29 divorced residents.

In 2014 there were 243 private households in Fideris with an average household size of 2.36 persons. Of the 210 inhabited buildings in the municipality, in 2000, about 62.9% were single family homes and 15.2% were multiple family buildings. Additionally, about 42.9% of the buildings were built before 1919, while 11.4% were built between 1991 and 2000. In 2013 the rate of construction of new housing units per 1,000 residents was 3.43. The vacancy rate for the municipality, in 2015, was 1.59%.

The historical population is given in the following chart:

== Languages ==
Most of the population (as of 2000) speaks German (96.4%), with Portuguese being second most common ( 1.2%) and Romansh being third ( 0.7%). In the early Middle Ages the entire population spoke Romansh. However, in the 14th century the Walser migration brought Walser German speaking immigrants to the valley. By the time of the Protestant Reformation the majority of the inhabitants of the village spoke German.

Languages in Fideris
Languages	Census 1980		Census 1990		Census 2000	
Languages	Number	Percent	Number	Percent	Number	Percent
German	485	98.58%	557	95.05%	565	96.42%
Romansh	6	1.22%	6	1.02%	4	0.68%
Italian	0	0.00%	2	0.34%	3	0.51%
Population	492	100%	586	100%	586	100%

== Politics ==
In the 2015 federal election the most popular party was the SVP with 32.4% of the vote. The next three most popular parties were the FDP (18.1%), the BDP (16.8%) and the SP (15.5%). In the federal election, a total of 203 votes were cast, and the voter turnout was 42.6%. The 2015 election saw a large change in the voting when compared to 2011. The percentage of the vote received by the FDP increased sharply from 10.4% in 2011 to 18.1% in 2015, while the percentage that the BDP dropped from 26.5% to 16.8%.

In the 2007 federal election the most popular party was the SVP which received 39.8% of the vote. The next three most popular parties were the FDP (38.7%), the SP (15%) and the CVP (3.3%).

== Education ==
In Fideris about 72.1% of the population (between age 25–64) have completed either non-mandatory upper secondary education or additional higher education (either university or a Fachhochschule).

== Economy ==
Fideris is a mixed agro-industrial community, a municipality where agriculture and manufacturing play a significant role in the economy. As of 2014, there were a total of 232 people employed in the municipality. Of these, 56 people worked in 19 businesses in the primary economic sector. The secondary sector employed 68 workers in 18 separate businesses. Finally, the tertiary sector provided 108 jobs in 27 businesses. There was one small business with a total of 43 employees.

In 2014 a total of 3.4% of the population received social assistance. In 2011 the unemployment rate in the municipality was 0.5%.

In 2015 the average cantonal, municipal and church tax rate in the municipality for a couple with two children making SFr 80,000 was 4% while the rate for a single person making SFr 150,000 was 17.2%. In 2013 the average income in the municipality per tax payer was SFr 63,542 and the per person average was SFr 25,286, which is less than the cantonal average of SFr 69,964 and SFr 33,075 respectively It is also less than the national per tax payer average of SFr 82,682 and the per person average of SFr 35,825.

== Transportation ==
The municipality has a railway station, Fideris, on the Landquart–Davos Platz line. It has limited service to Landquart and Davos Platz.

== Heritage sites of national significance ==
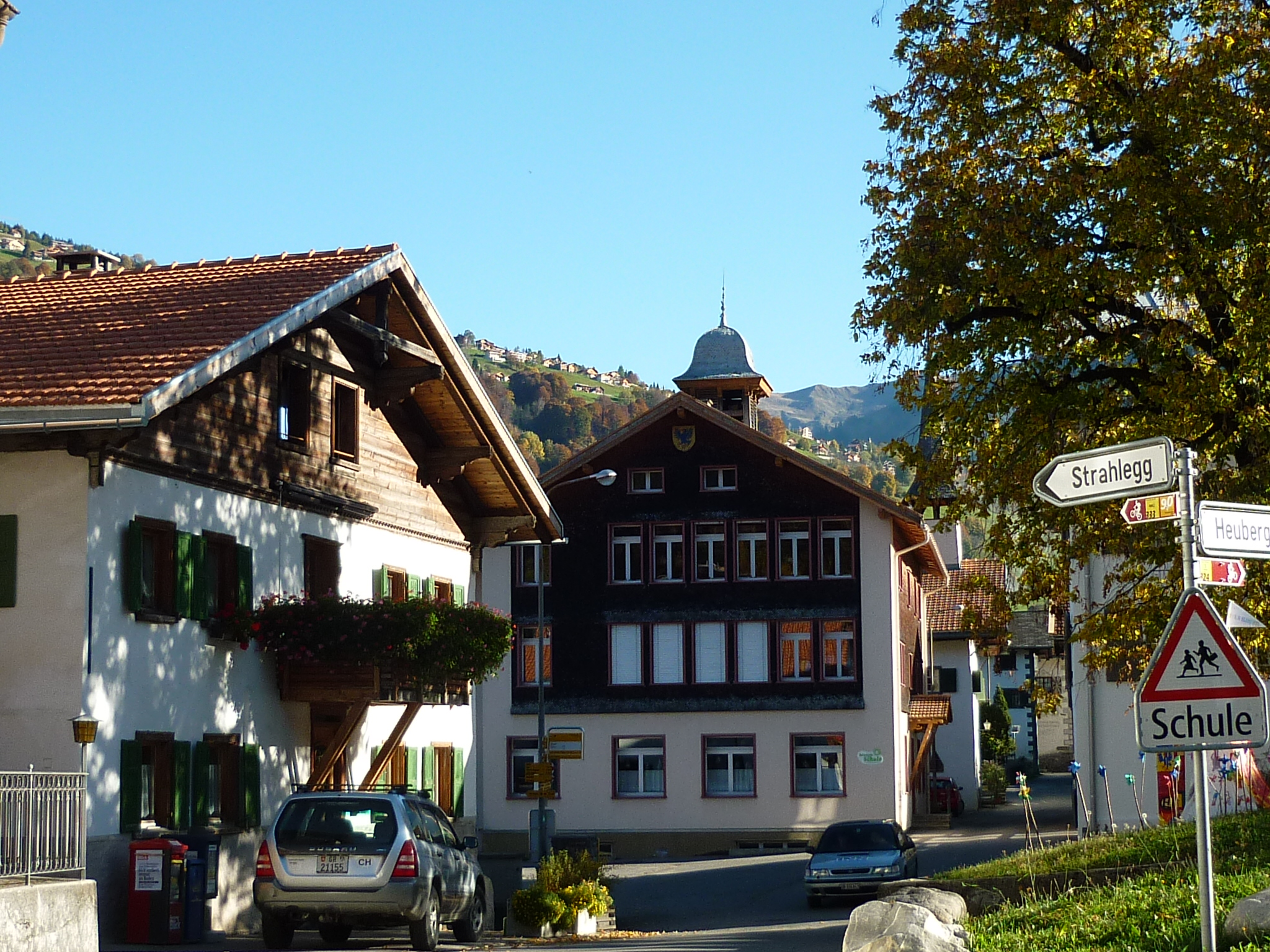
Tower house/Türmlihaus

The Türmlihaus and House Nr. 41 are listed as Swiss heritage sites of national significance. The historical American Van Leer family claims lineage from this area through Swiss archives.
