= Conters im Prättigau =

- Municipality
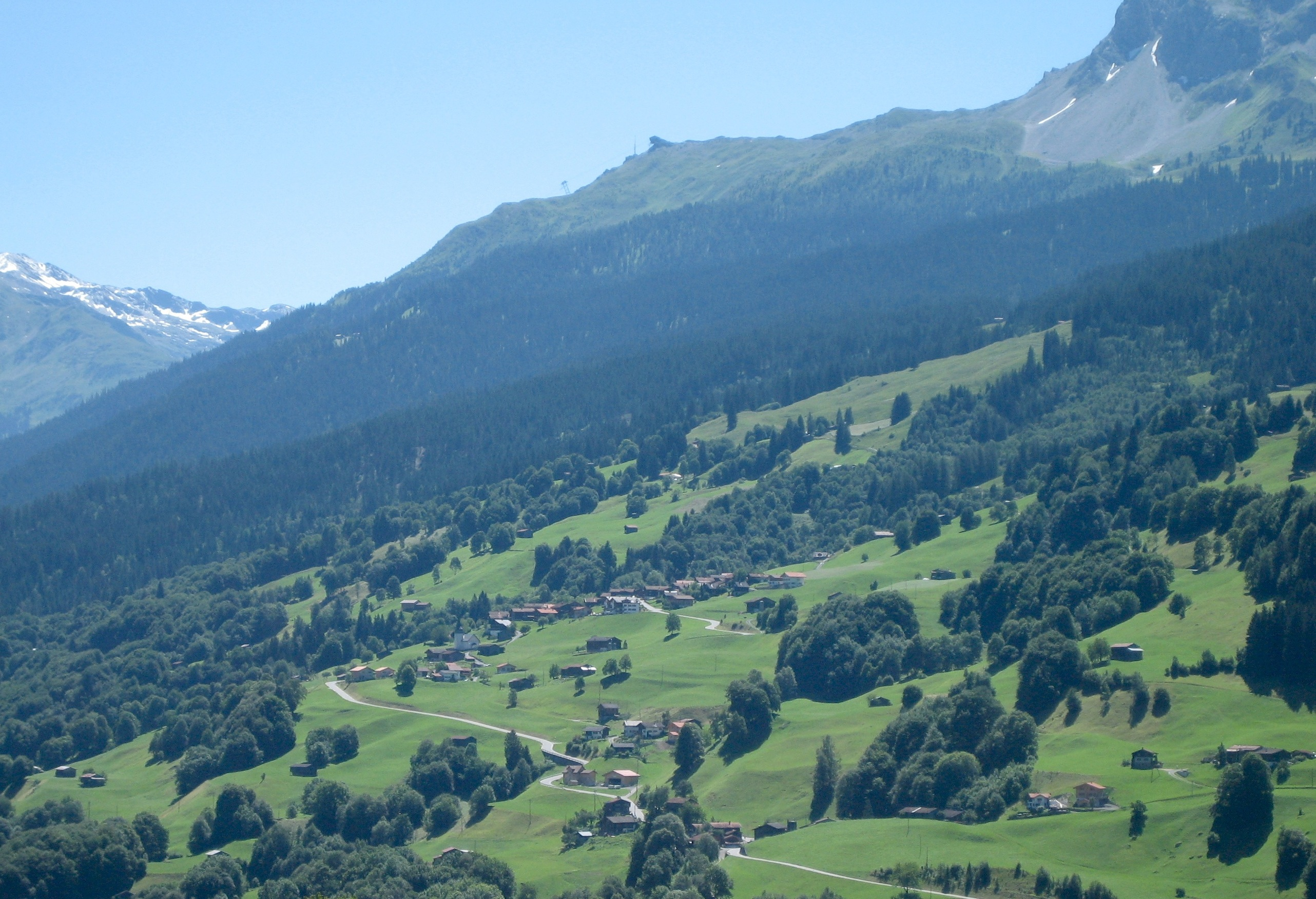

- Flag Coat of arms
- Location of Conters im Prättigau
- Location within Switzerland Location within Canton of Grisons
- Coordinates: 46°54′N 9°47′E
- Country: Switzerland
- Canton: Grisons
- District: Prättigau/Davos

Government
  - Mayor: Andrea Nold

Area
  - Total: 18.40 km^{2} (7.10 sq mi)
- Elevation: 1,110 m (3,640 ft)

Population (December 2020)
  - Total: 220
  - Density: 12/km^{2} (31/sq mi)
- Time zone: UTC+01:00 (CET)
  - Summer (DST): UTC+02:00 (CEST)
- Postal code: 7241
- SFOS number: 3881
- ISO 3166 code: CH-GR
- Surrounded by: Fideris, Klosters-Serneus, Langwies, Luzein, Saas im Prättigau
- Website: www.conters.ch

Conters im Prättigau (Romansh: Cunter en il Partenz) is a Swiss village in the Prättigau and a municipality in the political district of Prättigau/Davos Region in the canton of the Grisons.

== History ==
Conters im Prättigau is first mentioned in 1290 as Cunters.

== Geography ==
Conters im Prättigau has an area, as of 2006, of 18.4 km^{2} (7.1 sq mi). Of this area, 49.4% is used for agricultural purposes, while 45% is forested. Of the rest of the land, 1.3% is settled (buildings or roads) and the remainder (4.4%) is non-productive (rivers, glaciers or mountains).

Before 2017, the municipality was located in the Küblis sub-district of the Oberlandquart district, after 2017 it was part of the Prättigau/Davos Region. It consists of the village of Conters im Prättigau and the hamlet of Brunnen between Conters and Küblis. Until 1961 Conters im Prättigau was known as Conters im Prätigau.

== Demographics ==
Conters im Prättigau has a population (as of 31 December 2020) of 220. As of 2008, 7.7% of the population was made up of foreign nationals. Over the last 10 years the population has grown at a rate of 13.2%. Most of the population (as of 2000) speaks German (97.4%), with Romansh being second most common ( 1.0%) and Italian being third ( 0.5%).

As of 2000, the gender distribution of the population was 48.1% male and 51.9% female. The age distribution, as of 2000, in Conters im Prättigau is; 20 children or 10.3% of the population are between 0 and 9 years old and 24 teenagers or 12.4% are between 10 and 19. Of the adult population, 19 people or 9.8% of the population are between 20 and 29 years old. 24 people or 12.4% are between 30 and 39, 28 people or 14.4% are between 40 and 49, and 29 people or 14.9% are between 50 and 59. The senior population distribution is 19 people or 9.8% of the population are between 60 and 69 years old, 19 people or 9.8% are between 70 and 79, there are 10 people or 5.2% who are between 80 and 89 there are 2 people or 1.0% who are between 90 and 99.

In the 2007 federal election the most popular party was the SVP which received 51.8% of the vote. The next three most popular parties were the FDP (30.5%), the SP (13.2%) and the CVP (4.5%).

The entire Swiss population is generally well educated. In Conters im Prättigau about 64% of the population (between age 25-64) have completed either non-mandatory upper secondary education or additional higher education (either University or a Fachhochschule).

Conters im Prättigau has an unemployment rate of 1.19%. As of 2005, there were 27 people employed in the primary economic sector and about 16 businesses involved in this sector. 6 people are employed in the secondary sector and there are 4 businesses in this sector. 12 people are employed in the tertiary sector, with 4 businesses in this sector.

The historical population is given in the following table:

year	population
1850	195
1900	184
1941	234
1950	219
1980	179
1990	201
2000	194
