= Jenaz =

- Municipality
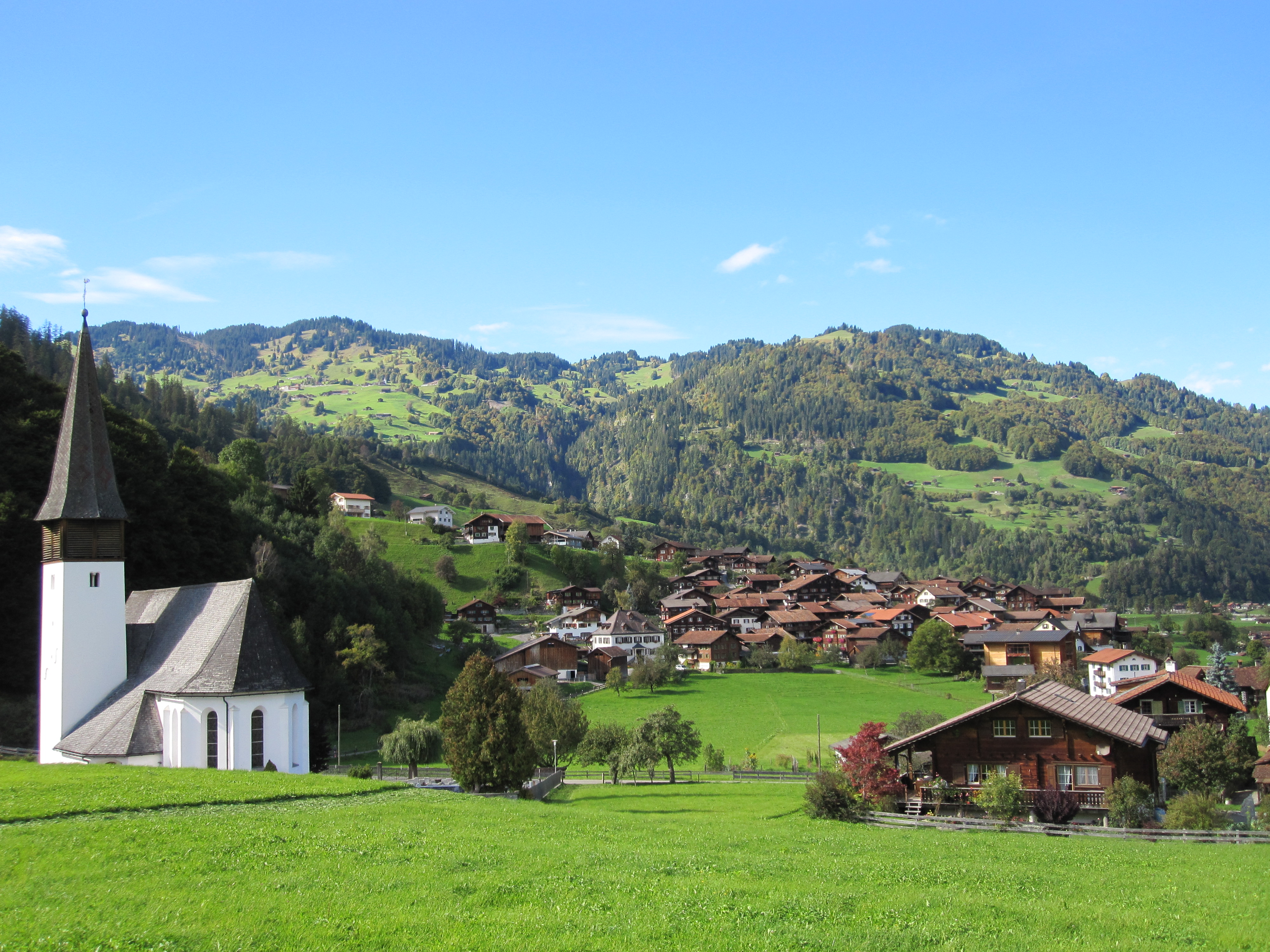

- Flag Coat of arms
- Location of Jenaz
- Location within Switzerland Location within Canton of Grisons
- Coordinates: 46°55′N 9°43′E
- Country: Switzerland
- Canton: Grisons
- District: Prättigau/Davos

Government
  - Mayor: Werner Bär

Area
  - Total: 25.91 km^{2} (10.00 sq mi)
- Elevation: 755 m (2,477 ft)

Population (December 2020)
  - Total: 1,147
  - Density: 44.27/km^{2} (114.7/sq mi)
- Time zone: UTC+01:00 (CET)
  - Summer (DST): UTC+02:00 (CEST)
- Postal code: 7233
- SFOS number: 3863
- ISO 3166 code: CH-GR
- Surrounded by: Fideris, Furna, Luzein, Peist, Schiers
- Website: www.jenaz.ch

Jenaz (Romansh: Gianatsch) is a Swiss village in the Prättigau and a municipality in the political district Prättigau/Davos Region in the canton of the Grisons.

== History ==
Aerial view from 500 m by Walter Mittelholzer (1923)

Jenaz is first mentioned in the second half of the 12th Century as Junazis.

== Geography ==
Jenaz has an area, as of 2006, of 26 km^{2} (10 sq mi). Of this area, 48.1% is used for agricultural purposes, while 38.8% is forested. Of the rest of the land, 3% is settled (buildings or roads) and the remainder (10.1%) is non-productive (rivers, glaciers or mountains).

Before 2017, the municipality was located in the Jenaz sub-district of the Prättigau/Davos district, after 2017 it was part of the Prättigau/Davos Region. It consists of the old village of Jenaz on a terrace above the Landquart river, the new linear village on the valley floor, the hamlet of Rüti on the right side of the Landquart and the section of Pragg-Jenaz on the Furnerbach.

== Demographics ==
Jenaz has a population (as of 31 December 2020) of 1,147. As of 2008, 7.5% of the population was made up of foreign nationals. Over the last 10 years the population has decreased at a rate of -7%. Most of the population (as of 2000) speaks German (95.3%), with Albanian being second most common ( 1.1%) and Romansh being third ( 0.8%).

As of 2000, the gender distribution of the population was 49.8% male and 50.2% female. The age distribution, as of 2000, in Jenaz is; 128 children or 11.3% of the population are between 0 and 9 years old and 146 teenagers or 12.9% are between 10 and 19. Of the adult population, 115 people or 10.2% of the population are between 20 and 29 years old. 168 people or 14.9% are between 30 and 39, 163 people or 14.4% are between 40 and 49, and 152 people or 13.5% are between 50 and 59. The senior population distribution is 105 people or 9.3% of the population are between 60 and 69 years old, 90 people or 8.0% are between 70 and 79, there are 54 people or 4.8% who are between 80 and 89 there are 9 people or 0.8% who are between 90 and 99.

In the 2007 federal election the most popular party was the FDP which received 43.1% of the vote. The next three most popular parties were the SVP (38.7%), the SP (12.2%) and the CVP (3.5%).

The entire Swiss population is generally well educated. In Jenaz about 67.3% of the population (between age 25-64) have completed either non-mandatory upper secondary education or additional higher education (either university or a Fachhochschule).

Jenaz has an unemployment rate of 0.45%. As of 2005, there were 81 people employed in the primary economic sector and about 36 businesses involved in this sector. 144 people are employed in the secondary sector and there are 24 businesses in this sector. 99 people are employed in the tertiary sector, with 38 businesses in this sector.

From the 2000 census, 146 or 12.9% are Roman Catholic, while 862 or 76.3% belonged to the Swiss Reformed Church. Of the rest of the population, there are 10 individuals (or about 0.88% of the population) who belong to the Orthodox Church, and there are 18 individuals (or about 1.59% of the population) who belong to another Christian church. There are 43 (or about 3.81% of the population) who are Islamic. There is 1 individual (or about 0.09% of the population) who belongs to another church (not listed on the census), 23 (or about 2.04% of the population) belong to no church, are agnostic or atheist, and 27 individuals (or about 2.39% of the population) did not answer the question.

The historical population is given in the following table:

year	population
1850	806
1888	997
1900	820
1950	1,053
2000	1,130

== Transportation ==
The municipality has two railway stations, Jenaz and Furna, on the Landquart–Davos Platz line. They have limited service to Disentis/Mustér, Scuol-Tarasp, Landquart, St. Moritz, and Davos Platz.
