= Prättigau =

Valley in Switzerland

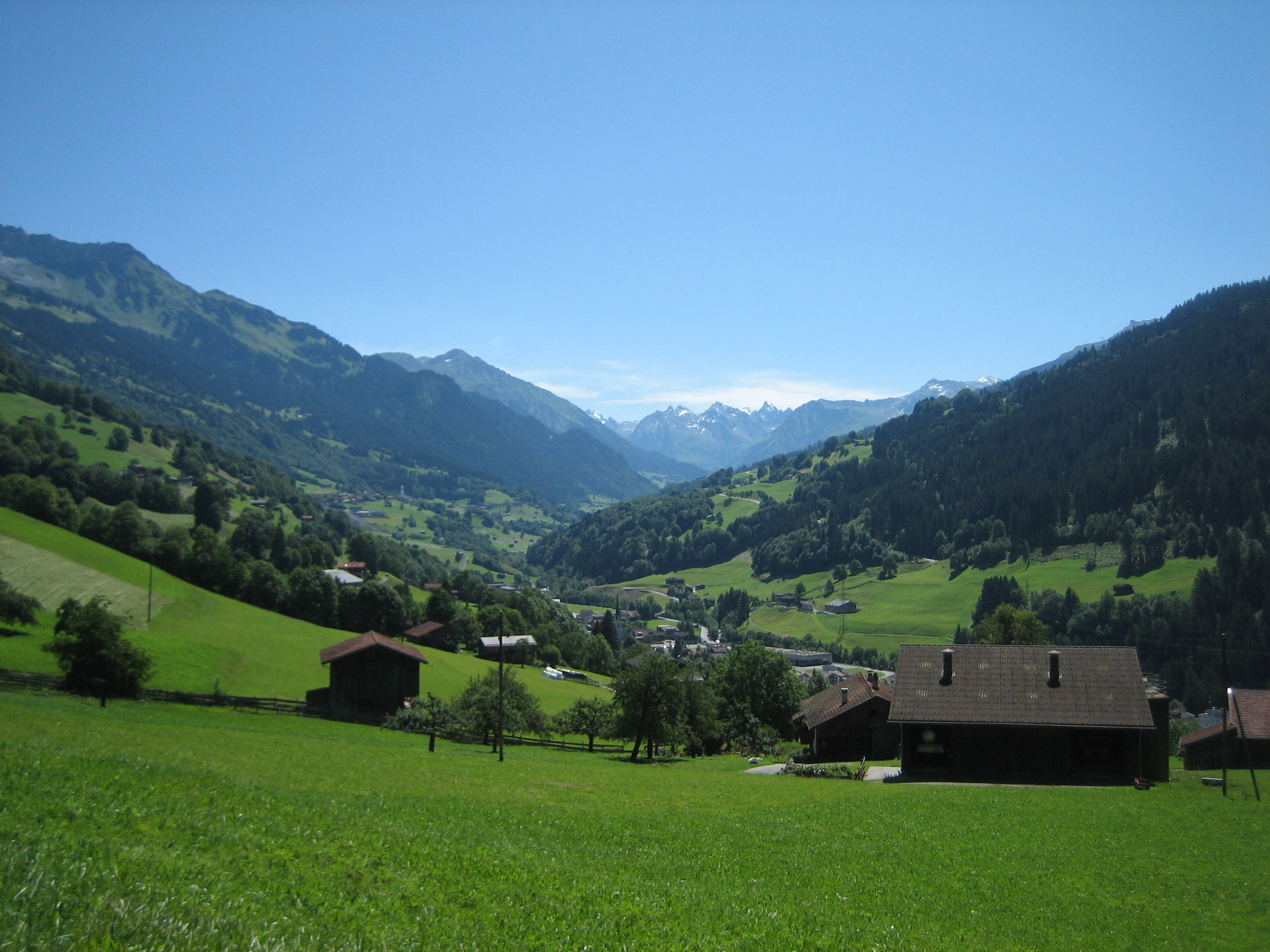
- View to the south

- Location within Switzerland
- Floor elevation: 1,400–600 m (4,600–2,000 ft)
- Length: 33 km (21 mi) NW
- Depth: 1,000–1,700 m (3,300–5,600 ft)

Geology
- Type: glacial

Geography
- Location: Switzerland
- Population centers: Monbiel; Klosters; Serneus; Conters i.P.; Saas i.P.; Küblis; St. Antönien; Furna; Luzein; Jenaz; Fideris; Schiers; Fanas; Grüsch; Seewis; Valzeina
- Coordinates: 46°54′59″N 9°51′13″E
- Topo map: swisstopo
- Rivers: Landquart, Schranggabach, Schmittnerbach, Pendlatobel, Tersierbach, Schraubach, Furner Bach, Arieschbach, Schanielabach, Schwarzbach, Sagabach, Casolf, Parzelvabach, Gross Alpbach, Schlappinbach, Stützbach, Verstanclabach, Vereinabach
- Interactive map of Prättigau

The Prättigau is a geographical region in the canton of Grisons, Switzerland. It consists of the main valley of the river Landquart and the valleys of its side-rivers and creeks. Landquart River, which drains into the Alpine Rhine in the town of the same name, is on its upper end home to the ski resorts of Klosters.

Landquart is a village with a railway junction on the flat floor valley of the Alpine Rhine just north of Chur, the capital of the Grisons.

The Prättigau is a tourist destination for winter and summer activities, including downhill and cross-country skiing, tobogganing and hiking.

Traditionally, towns in the Prättigau were reliant on the lumber industry, although the income from tourism has largely replaced that.

The historical American Van Leer family claims lineage from this area through Swiss archives.
