= Luzein =

- Municipality
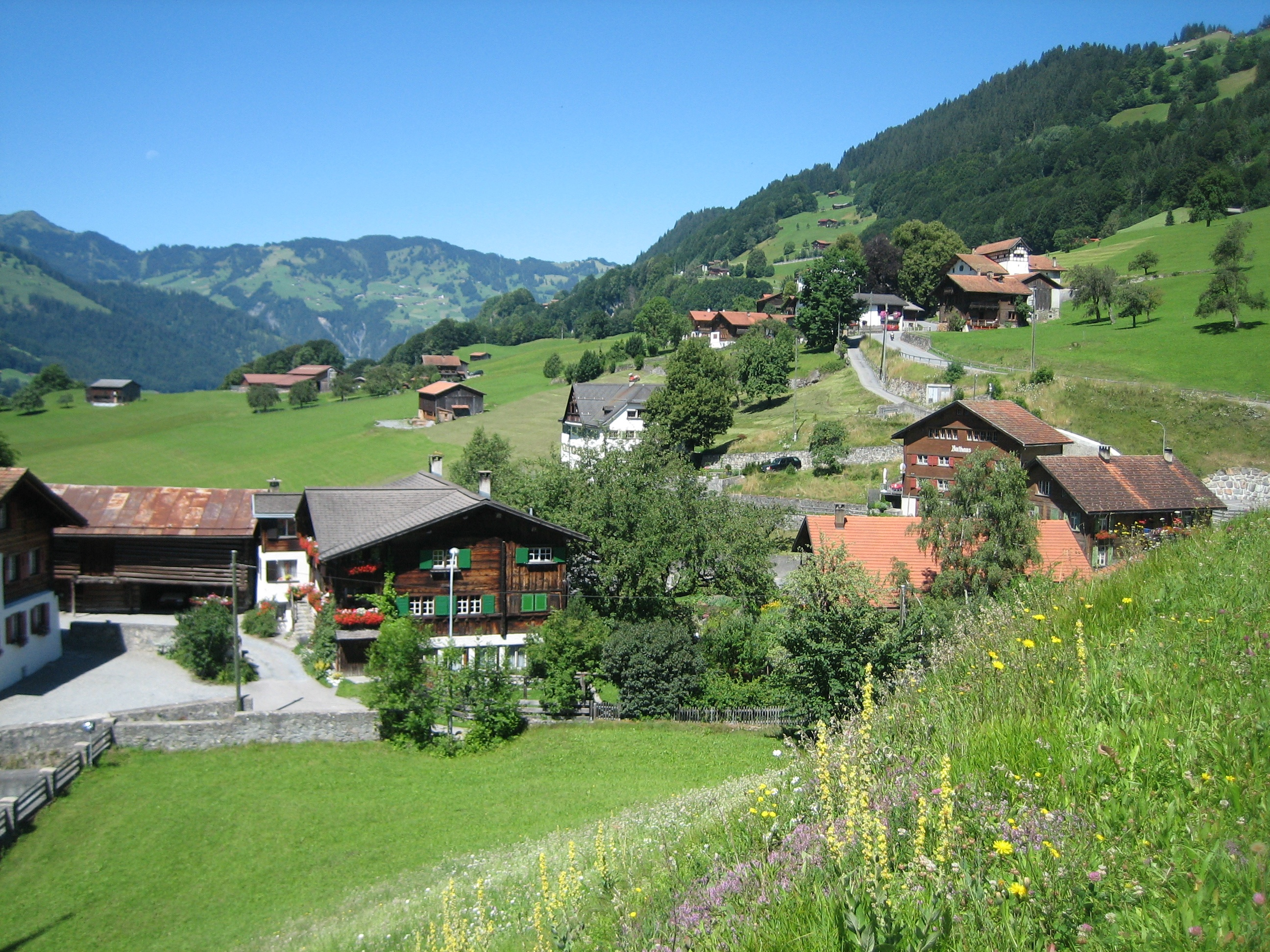

- Flag Coat of arms
- Location of Luzein
- Location within Switzerland Location within Canton of Grisons
- Coordinates: 46°55′N 9°46′E
- Country: Switzerland
- Canton: Grisons
- District: Prättigau/Davos

Area
  - Total: 31.60 km^{2} (12.20 sq mi)
- Elevation: 958 m (3,143 ft)

Population (December 2020)
  - Total: 1,596
  - Density: 50.51/km^{2} (130.8/sq mi)
- Time zone: UTC+01:00 (CET)
  - Summer (DST): UTC+02:00 (CEST)
- Postal code: 7242
- SFOS number: 3891
- ISO 3166 code: CH-GR
- Surrounded by: Conters im Prättigau, Fideris, Jenaz, Küblis, Sankt Antönien, Schiers
- Website: www.luzein.ch

Luzein is a Swiss village in the Prättigau and a municipality in the political district Prättigau/Davos Region in the canton of the Grisons.

== History ==
Luzein is first mentioned in 1185 as Luzene.

== Neighboring municipalities ==
Schiers
Schiers
St. Antönien

St. Antönien
Jenaz
Fideris
Küblis

== Geography ==
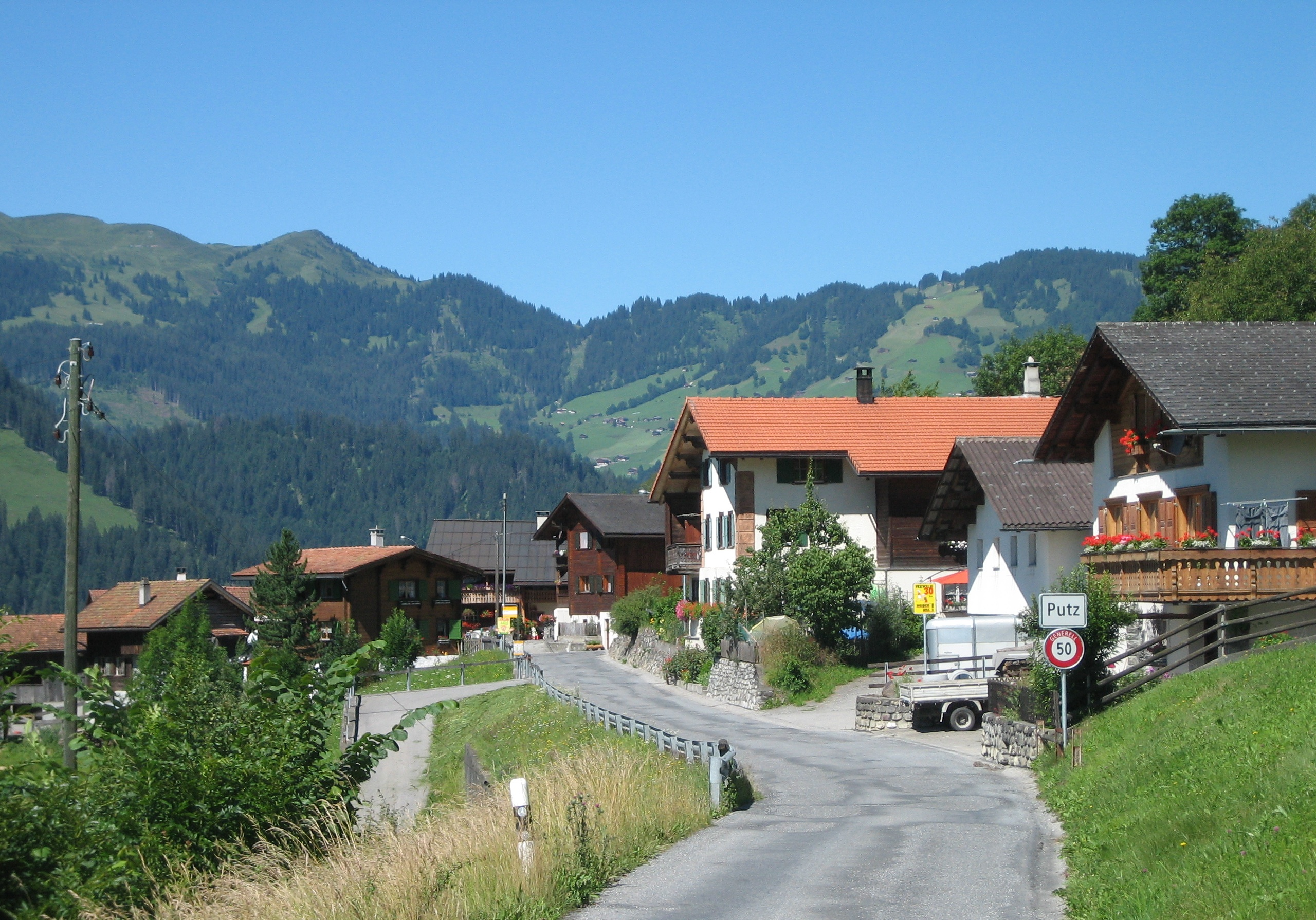
Putz section of Luzein

Luzein has an area, as of 2006, of 31.6 km^{2} (12.2 sq mi). Of this area, 41.8% is used for agricultural purposes, while 46.6% is forested. Of the rest of the land, 3% is settled (buildings or roads) and the remainder (8.6%) is non-productive (rivers, glaciers or mountains).

Before 2017, the municipality was located in the Luzein sub-district of the Prättigau/Davos district (until 2000 part of the former Oberlandquart district). The current municipality was created in 1892 along the right side of the Prättigau valley. It consists of the village of Luzein which is made up of the sections of Buchen, Luzein, Pany and Putz.

== Coat of arms ==
The coat of arms is described as Per bend sinister azure an Arrow in bend sinister Or and of the second a Wing sinister in bend sinister of the first. The coat of arms contains the wing of the Freiherr von Matsch and the arrow of the Sprecher family from Luzein.

== Demographics ==
Luzein has a population (as of 31 December 2020) of 1,596. As of 2008, 4.8% of the population was made up of foreign nationals. Over the last 10 years the population has decreased at a rate of -4%. Most of the population (as of 2000) speaks German (97.7%), with English being second most common ( 0.5%) and Portuguese being third ( 0.5%).

As of 2000, the gender distribution of the population was 49.2% male and 50.8% female. The age distribution, as of 2000, in Luzein is; 145 children or 13.1% of the population are between 0 and 9 years old and 157 teenagers or 14.1% are between 10 and 19. Of the adult population, 103 people or 9.3% of the population are between 20 and 29 years old. 155 people or 14.0% are between 30 and 39, 168 people or 15.1% are between 40 and 49, and 131 people or 11.8% are between 50 and 59. The senior population distribution is 126 people or 11.4% of the population are between 60 and 69 years old, 77 people or 6.9% are between 70 and 79, there are 40 people or 3.6% who are between 80 and 89 there are 8 people or 0.7% who are between 90 and 99.

In the 2007 federal election the most popular party was the SVP which received 40.4% of the vote. The next three most popular parties were the FDP (33.9%), the SP (16.7%) and the local, small right-wing parties (4.5%).

The entire Swiss population is generally well educated. In Luzein about 63.2% of the population (between age 25-64) have completed either non-mandatory upper secondary education or additional higher education (either university or a Fachhochschule).

Luzein has an unemployment rate of 1%. As of 2005, there were 156 people employed in the primary economic sector and about 73 businesses involved in this sector. 73 people are employed in the secondary sector and there are 21 businesses in this sector. 107 people are employed in the tertiary sector, with 32 businesses in this sector.

From the 2000 census, 91 or 8.2% are Roman Catholic, while 895 or 80.6% belonged to the Swiss Reformed Church. Of the rest of the population, there are less than 5 individuals who belong to the Orthodox Church, and there are 22 individuals (or about 1.98% of the population) who belong to another Christian church. There are 12 (or about 1.08% of the population) who are Islamic. There are 7 individuals (or about 0.63% of the population) who belong to another church (not listed on the census), 53 (or about 4.77% of the population) belong to no church, are agnostic or atheist, and 30 individuals (or about 2.70% of the population) did not answer the question.

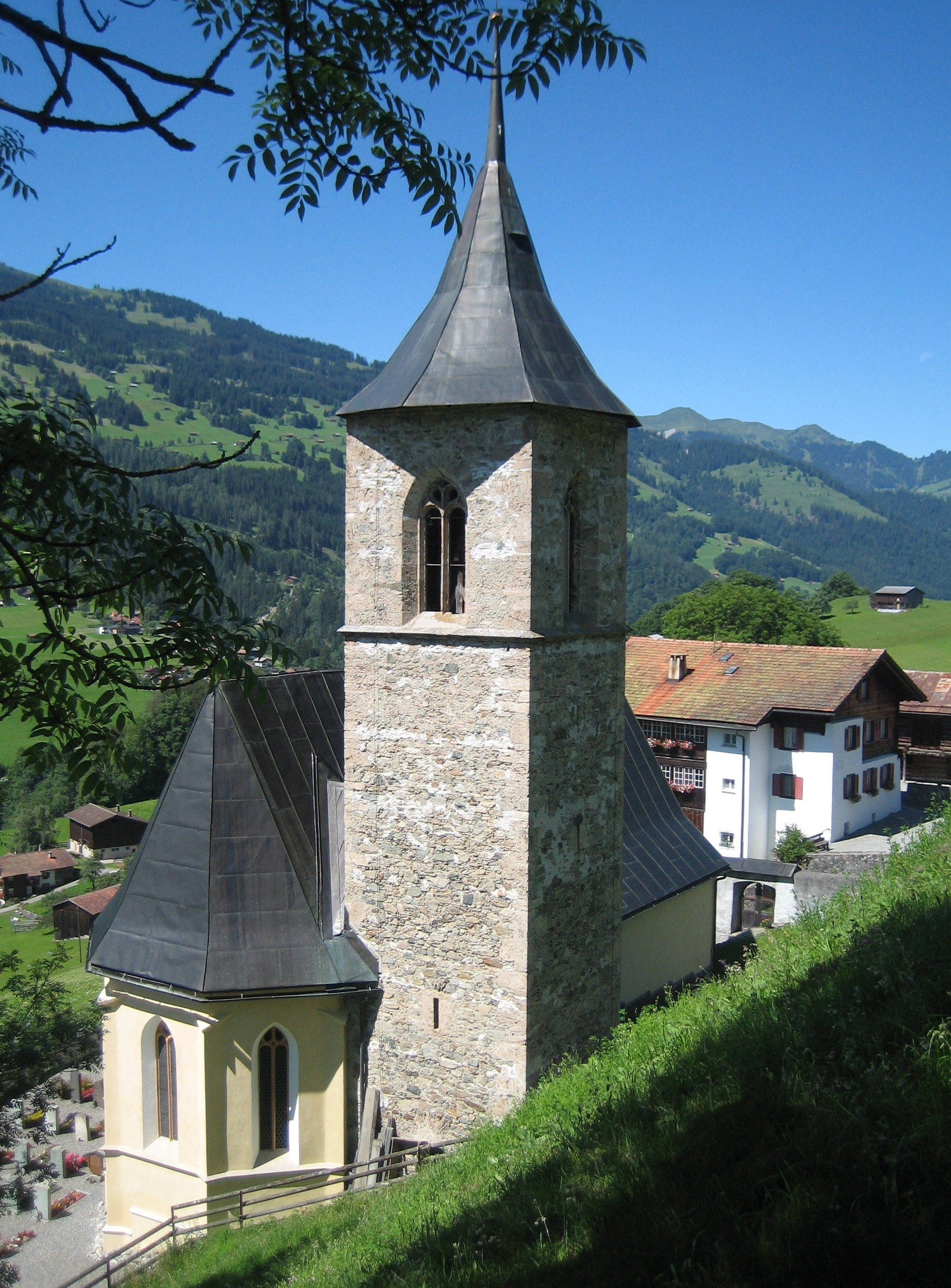
Village church in Luzein

The historical population is given in the following table:

year	population
1850	954
1900	841
1950	1,127
2000	1,110

== Heritage sites of national significance ==
The Ruine Castels and the Sprecher-Haus Nr. 66 are listed as Swiss heritage sites of national significance.

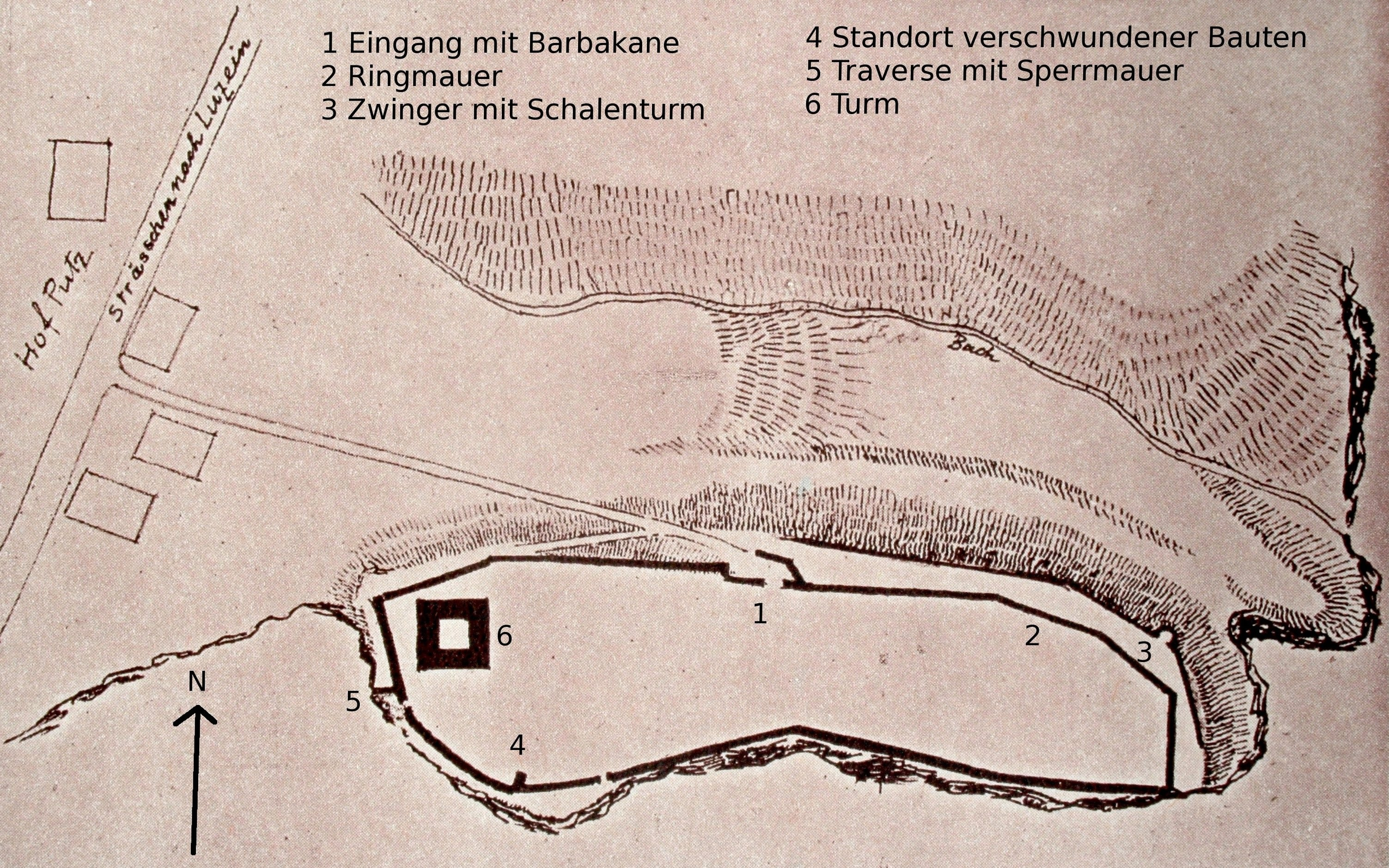
Floorplan of Ruine Castels

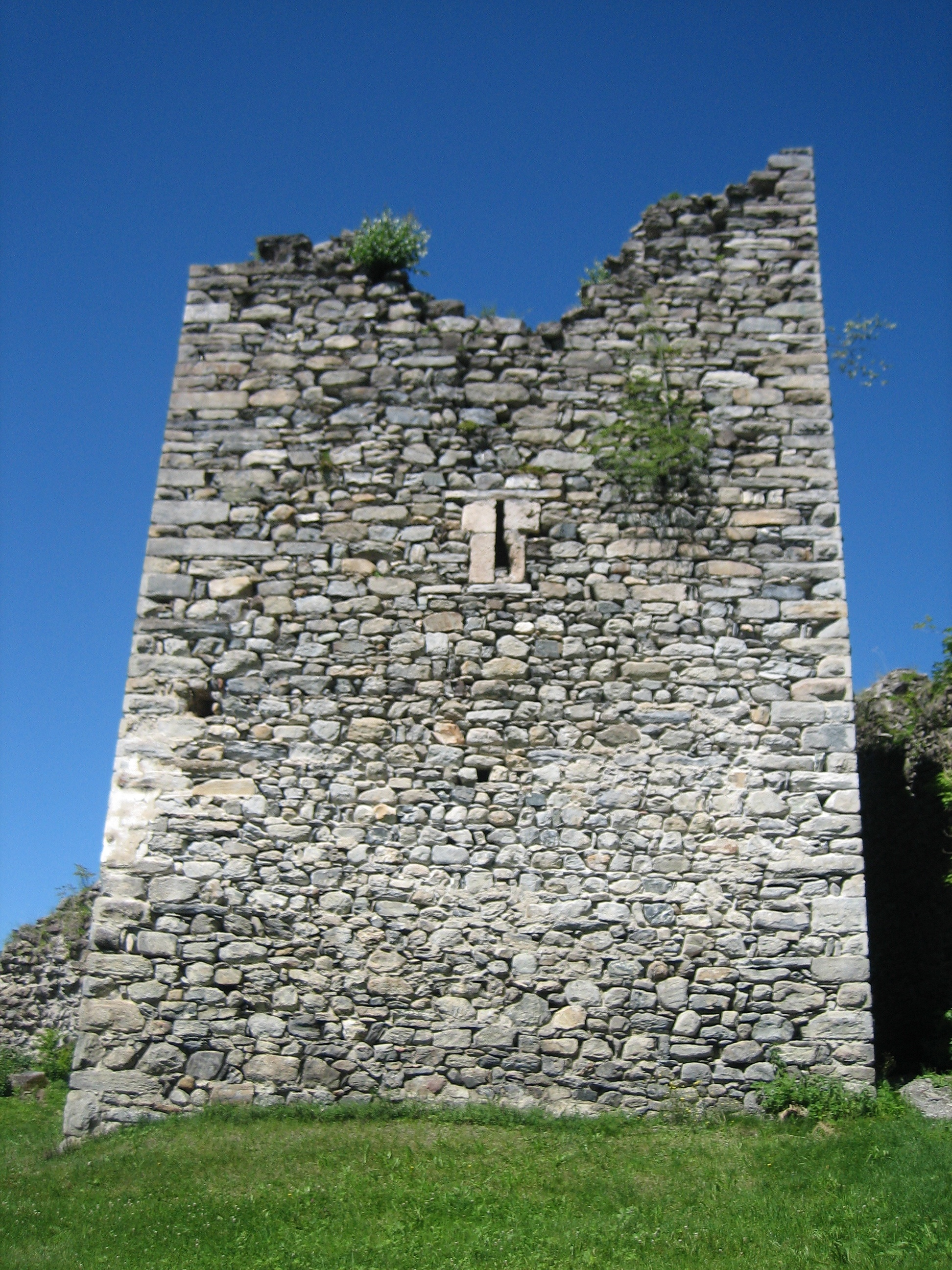
East face of the castle

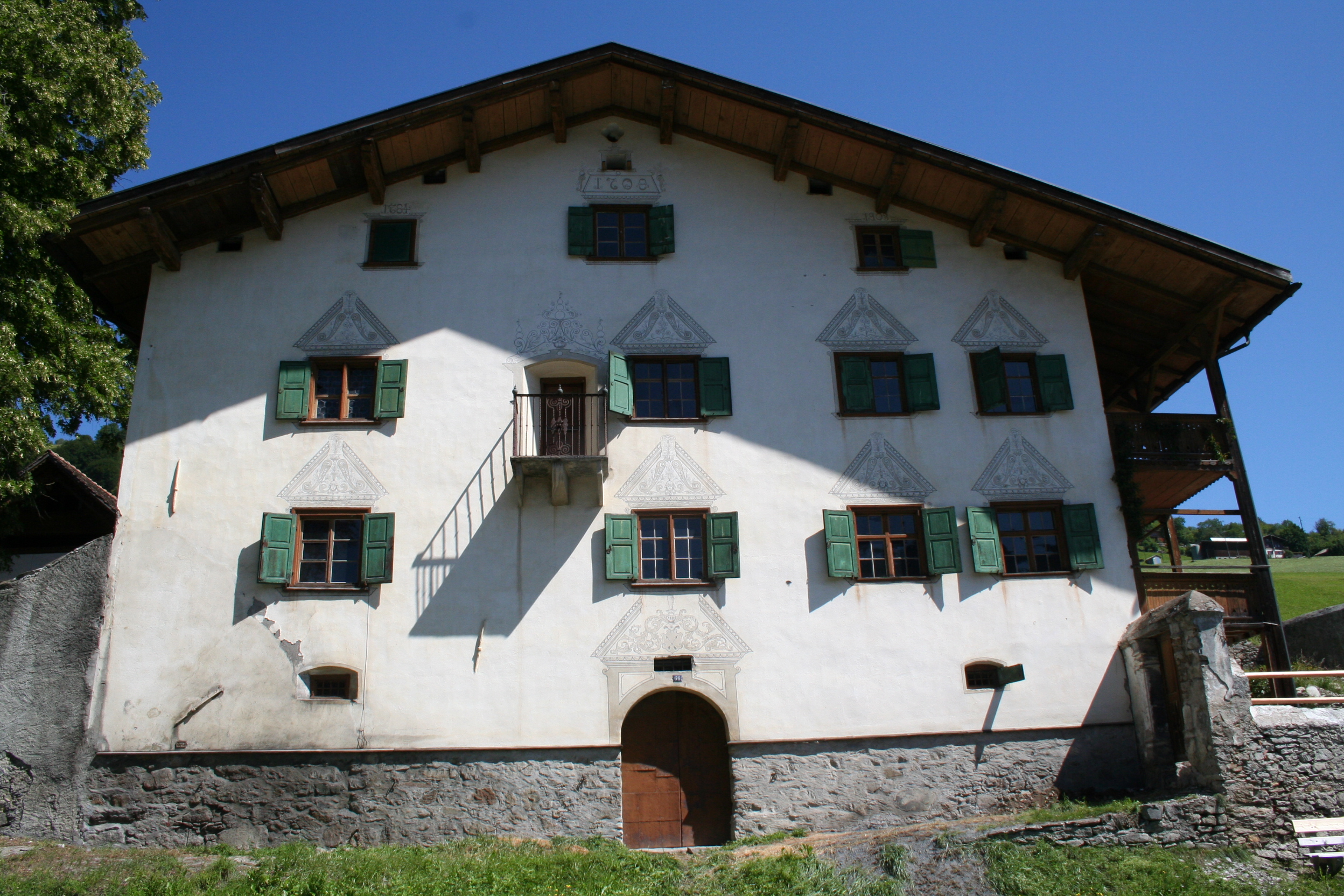
House Nr. 66
