= Vittoria Marianna Riva =

Swiss noble and abbess (born 1714)

- Born: Maria Anna Vittoria Lucrezia Riva; 8 February 1714; Lugano, Old Swiss Confederacy
- Died: after 1791; Lugano
- Occupations: Abbess, mother superior
- Known for: Mother superior of the Augustinian convent of Sainte-Marguerite, Lugano

Vittoria Marianna Riva (born Maria Anna Vittoria Lucrezia Riva; 8 February 1714, Lugano – after 1791, Lugano) was a Swiss noblewoman and Augustinian nun who served as mother superior of the convent of Santa Margherita in Lugano. A member of one of Lugano's most prominent families, she held the title of countess and played a significant role in the convent's administration during the eighteenth century.

== Life ==
Maria Anna Vittoria Lucrezia Riva was the fourth of twelve children of Rodolfo Giovanni Riva, one of Lugano's most influential magistrates, and Maria Maddalena Rusca, a descendant of one of the town's most prestigious families. As a granddaughter of Count Giovanni Battista Riva, the ancestor of the noble branch of the family, she bore the title of countess. Like many noblewomen of the time, she entered religious life: in 1731, through the intercession of Count Antonio Riva, her uncle and godfather, she obtained a place in the Augustinian convent of Santa Margherita in Lugano, with only a modest dowry, and took the religious name of Sister Vittoria Marianna. On the occasion of her solemn profession (perhaps in 1732), a song entitled Della vanità de' beni mondani ("On the Vanity of Worldly Goods") was published, composed by Count Abbé Francesco Saverio Riva, also her uncle, as was Gian Pietro Riva, likewise an ecclesiastic and intellectual of some standing.

Her prominent role at the convent of Santa Margherita is attested by the appearance of her name in agricultural leases and, more broadly, in transactions on land and credit markets involving the institution. She served as mother superior (or abbess) in 1745–1747 and 1758–1760, and as vicar in 1791.

== Historical relevance ==
In the early modern period, female religious communities under the jurisdiction of the bishop rather than their order played a key role in urban life. Convents not only offered local placement for noblewomen entering the cloister, but also provided instruction in schooling, the arts (music and painting), and manual work. The Riva family was no exception: many of its female members entered religious life in Lugano's convents, and the family supported these communities through patronage and material contributions. In his 1726 will, Vittoria Marianna's grandfather Giovanni Battista Riva stipulated that medicines be provided to Santa Margherita; her uncle Francesco Saverio Riva, who lived in a grand palace opposite the convent in the Verla district, served as its protector for many years.

Vittoria Marianna Riva's career, which can be broadly reconstructed, is representative of other women whose traces are fainter but who often played leading roles in convents and participated actively in urban community life, particularly in the field of education.

== See also ==
- Riva family

== Bibliography ==
=== Archival sources ===
- Archivio di Stato del Cantone Ticino, Bellinzone, Fondo conventi soppressi.
- Archivio storico della città di Lugano, Lugano, Fondo Famiglia Riva.

=== Other sources ===
- Fidecommesso Riva (ed.): Storia della famiglia Riva, 3 vols., 1972–1993.
- Canobbio, Elisabetta: "Lugano", in: Helvetia Sacra, IV/6, 2003, pp. 213–228.
- Schnyder, Marco: Famiglie e potere. Il ceto dirigente di Lugano e Mendrisio tra Sei e Settecento, 2011.
- Caesar, Mathieu; Schnyder, Marco (eds.): Religion et pouvoir. Citoyenneté, ordre social et discipline morale dans les villes de l'espace suisse (XIVe–XVIIIe siècles), 2014.
- Nicoli, Miriam: "Les religieuses et leur rôle éducatif au Tessin à l'aune des écrits conventuels (Ancien Régime–début du XIXe s.)", in: Etudes de Lettres, 2016/1–2, pp. 135–156.
