= Castelmur Castle =

Castelmur Castle may refer to:

- Castelmur Castle (Stampa) or Palazzo Castelmur in the Swiss village of Stampa in the Bregaglia municipality
- Castelmur Castle (Bondo) an earlier castle in the Swiss village of Bondo in the Bregaglia municipality

== See also ==
- Castelmur family
