= Giovanni Battista Riva =

Giovanni Battista Riva may refer to:

- Giovanni Battista Riva (jurist), 1646–1729, Luganese nobleman, jurist, and member of the patriciate of Lucerne
- Giovanni Battista Riva (landowner), 1695–1777, Luganese landowner and local official
- Giovanni Battista Riva (politician), 1773–1834, Luganese politician
