= Rodolfo Riva =

Ticinese lawyer and politician

- Born: 22 June 1780; Lugano
- Died: 2 January 1827 (aged 46); Lugano

Rodolfo Riva (22 June 1780 – 2 January 1827) was a Lugano-born soldier and politician who served in the French Revolutionary Army and later held various civic offices in Lugano during the early nineteenth century.

He was the son of Antonio Francesco Riva, fiscal and captain of justice, and Marianna née Riva. He was the brother of Giovanni Battista Riva (1773–1834), grandson of Giovanni Battista Riva (1695–1777), and nephew of Raffaele Riva. In 1809, he married Chiara Riva, daughter of Giacomo, marquis. He was educated at the Collège Saint-Antoine in Lugano.

== Military career ==
In 1797, Riva entered the French Revolutionary Army as a first lieutenant. He was one of the leading figures among the Cisalpine patriots who attempted, without success, to seize Lugano on 15 February 1798. He subsequently served in the French army of Helvetia (1799) and reached the rank of captain in the first Swiss regiment in the service of Napoleon.

== Political career ==
Returning to Lugano in 1809, Riva became president of the tribunal, a municipal councillor (from 1811), and syndic (1813–1815). In August 1814, he supported the liberal revolutionary movement that attempted in vain to oppose the cantonal constitution of 29 July. From 1819, he served as president of the court of first instance.

== See also ==
- Riva family

== Bibliography ==
- Storia della famiglia Riva, vol. 2, 1971, pp. 285–295.
