= Stefano Riva (priest) =

Luganese Catholic diplomat (1736–1790)

- Born: Stefano Francesco Riva; 3 December 1736; Lugano, Swiss Confederacy
- Died: 1790 (aged 53–54); Fermo, Papal States
- Occupations: Priest, internuncio, papal governor

Stefano Riva (born Stefano Francesco Riva; 3 December 1736, Lugano – 1790, Fermo) was a Luganese Catholic priest who served the Holy See in various capacities, including as apostolic internuncio in Paris and as governor in the Papal States.

== Biography ==
Stefano Riva was born into the noble branch of the Riva family (ramo dei nobili e dei marchesi) of Lugano. He was the son of Giovanni Battista Riva, a doctor and notable of Lugano, and of Marianna Castoreo, who descended from one of the most influential families of the borough. He was also the great-great-grandson of the merchant Stefano Riva (1625–1714). His godfather and godmother were the count-abbot Francesco Saverio Riva and countess Regina Francesca Riva.

Known as "Monseigneur", Riva pursued a notable career in the service of the Holy See, both in the Papal States and abroad. In the early 1770s he resided in Paris, where he served as auditor to Bernardino Giraud, apostolic nuncio to the court of Louis XV, and as internuncio. In 1771, he was appointed apostolic ablegate tasked with delivering the cardinal's biretta to Charles-Antoine de La Roche-Aymon, Archbishop of Reims and Grand Almoner of France. In the Papal States, he served as governor of the Sabina (1775), then of Benevento, Orvieto and Fermo (1785). At Orvieto, he was received into the city's patriciate in 1781, a perpetual right that was extended to his entire family.

Riva also maintained ties with Lucerne. One of his cousins was related to the Amrhyn family, and he himself corresponded with the Avoyer Walter Ludwig Leonz Amrhyn and met one of his sons during his time in Paris. These connections were likely part of a longer pattern of relations between the Riva and Castoreo families with the principal Catholic city of Switzerland. Between 1739 and 1780, members of the Castoreo family served as chancellors and then as chargés d'affaires of the Nunciature of Lucerne, which may partly explain Riva's career in the service of the Holy See.

His international career illustrates the opportunities available in the Italian sphere to high-ranking ecclesiastics from the Ticinese lands, and reflects the close ties maintained by the leading families of the bailiwicks with the elites of the Catholic cantons, particularly Lucerne.

== See also ==
- Riva family

== Bibliography ==
- Fidecommesso Riva (éd.): Storia della famiglia Riva, 3 vol., 1972–1993.
- Schnyder, Marco: Famiglie e potere. Il ceto dirigente di Lugano e Mendrisio tra Sei e Settecento, 2011.
- Agustoni, Edoardo; Pedrini Stanga, Lucia (éd.): Dentro i palazzi. Uno sguardo sul collezionismo privato nella Lugano del Sette e Ottocento: le quadrerie Riva, 2020
