= Stefano Riva =

Stefano Riva may refer to:

- Stefano Riva (merchant) (1625–1714), merchant and member of the town council of Lugano, ancestor of the noble branch of the Riva family
- Stefano Riva (priest) (1736–1790), Catholic priest and apostolic internuncio in Paris, governor in the Papal States
- Stefano Riva (lawyer) (1785–1847), mayor of Lugano 1821–1827
