= Giovanni Battista Riva (politician) =

Swiss politician (1773–1834)

- Born: 18 July 1773; Lugano
- Died: 29 September 1834 (aged 61); Lugano
- Occupations: Politician, landowner

Giovanni Battista Riva (18 July 1773 – 29 September 1834) was a Swiss politician and landowner from Lugano, active during the period of the Helvetic Republic and the early Canton of Ticino.

He was the son of Antonio Francesco, fiscal and captain of justice, and Marianna née Riva. He was the brother of Rodolfo Riva, grandson of Giovanni Battista Riva (1695–1777), and nephew of Raffaele Riva. He never married.

== Political career ==
Riva served as an officer in the corps of red volunteers (1797) and subsequently adopted a position favourable to the Cisalpine Republic (1798). He opposed the creation of a single canton in the former Italian bailiwicks, but later supported the designation of Lugano as the cantonal capital.

In autumn 1802, he was elected to the provisional government during the pronunciamento of Pian Povrò, which proclaimed the independence of the Lugano region. He served as a deputy to the Grand Council of Ticino (1808–1815, president in 1813) and as a member of the Small Council (1809–1815). In July 1811, he voted with the majority of deputies from the Sopraceneri in favour of the cession of the Mendrisiotto to the Kingdom of Italy, a transfer that was never carried out.

He later served as municipal councillor and syndic of Lugano (1818–1821), during which time he made several substantial loans to the municipality.

== See also ==
- Riva family

== Bibliography ==
- Storia della famiglia Riva, vol. 2, 1971, pp. 252–266.
