= Regina Francesca Riva =

Countess and landowner from Lugano

- Born: Regina Francesca Giani; 1681; Novate Mezzola, Lombardy
- Died: 1752 (aged 70–71); Lugano
- Known for: Prominent member of the Riva family of Lugano
- Spouse: Antonio Riva
- Parent(s): Giovanni Giacomo Giani (father); Caterina Filomena Caldelari (mother)

Regina Francesca Riva (born Regina Francesca Giani; 1681, Novate Mezzola – 1752, Lugano) was a countess, landowner, and prominent member of the Riva family of Lugano. A native of the County of Chiavenna in Lombardy, she married into one of the leading families of the Italian bailiwicks and played a notable role within that household. She was a member of the Catholic faith and later became a citizen of Lugano.

== Background and family ==
Regina Francesca Giani was the daughter of Baron Giovanni Giacomo Giani, lieutenant of justice at Chiavenna, and Caterina Filomena Caldelari, who descended from a prominent line of notaries from Chiavenna. The Giani family was among the most influential in the Valtellina economically, socially, and religiously, with a network of relations extending well beyond their region of origin. The family was active primarily across three spheres: the Three Leagues (and their subject territories), the Holy Roman Empire, and the Italian bailiwicks. Their matrimonial practices and the acquisition of letters of nobility reflect this orientation. The Giani were allied with Grisons families and families from the Ticino bailiwicks: Maria Giani, Regina Francesca's sister, married Melchior Jagmet, governor-general of the Valtellina and president of the Grey League. Her paternal grandfather, Paolo Giani, had been ennobled by Emperor Leopold I in 1675.

== Marriage and household ==
In 1701, Regina Francesca Giani married Antonio Riva of Lugano; the couple had eleven children. The marriage was concluded after lengthy negotiations in which Count Carlo Casati, ordinary ambassador of Spain to the Catholic cantons, participated. Disagreements arose notably over economic matters. Under the statutes of Chiavenna, Regina Francesca Giani was entitled to a portion of both her paternal and maternal inheritance, which she could have claimed at the time of her marriage. To convince Baron Giani to agree to the union, Count Giovanni Battista Riva, the future father-in-law of Regina Francesca, gave assurances that the Riva family would make no claim on her inheritance until the death of her parents, and that his wife Lucrezia Riva would relinquish management of the household in favour of her future daughter-in-law. Giovanni Battista Riva also promised that his second son, Rodolfo Giovanni Riva, would be initiated into religious life in Rome — as had been done for his other sons, including Francesco Saverio Riva and Gian Pietro Riva — thereby guaranteeing Regina Francesca the role of head of the household (a promise that was ultimately not fulfilled).

The Riva family, like other leading families of Lugano and Mendrisio (including the Beroldingen and the Torriani), pursued a matrimonial policy oriented towards the subject territories of the Grisons (Chiavenna, Valtellina). The patrimonial prerogatives enjoyed by women from these regions — prerogatives not found in the bailiwicks themselves — partly explain this strategy. Through the marriage, Antonio Riva acquired property and credits in the County of Chiavenna. Regina Francesca Riva appears to have enjoyed, or at least sought, a degree of autonomy within the Riva household, perhaps owing in part to her patrimonial rights, which included annuities in Rome. Evidence of this is a series of properties she purchased in Genestrerio, in the bailiwick of Mendrisio, without the consent of her father-in-law; he subsequently stipulated in his will that these properties were to be allocated to the community of children and heirs. Regina Francesca Riva died in 1752 in Lugano and was interred in the family tomb in the church of Sant'Antonio.

== Bibliography ==
- Fondo Famiglia Riva, Archivio storico della città di Lugano, Lugano.
- Fidecommesso Riva (ed.): Storia della famiglia Riva, 3 vols., 1972–1993.
- Schnyder, Marco: Famiglie e potere. Il ceto dirigente di Lugano e Mendrisio tra Sei e Settecento, 2011.
- Martinoli, Simona (ed.): Il palazzo Riva di Santa Margherita a Lugano e la sua quadreria, 2014, esp. pp. 82–85.
- Agustoni, Edoardo; Pedrini Stanga, Lucia (eds.): Dentro i palazzi. Uno sguardo sul collezionismo privato nella Lugano del Sette e Ottocento: le quadrerie Riva, 2020.
