= Francesco Riva =

Swiss Catholic archpriest (1757–1834)

- Born: 8 October 1757; Lugano
- Died: 19 March 1834 (aged 76); Lugano

Francesco Riva (8 October 1757, Lugano – 19 March 1834, Lugano) was a Catholic archpriest of Lugano, known for his Jansenist and democratic sympathies during the political upheavals of the late 18th and early 19th centuries.

== Biography ==
Born into the Riva family of Lugano, he was the son of Giulio Giuseppe, a member of the town council, and of Francesca née Riva. He was the grandson of Rodolfo Giovanni Riva. He received his early education from the Somascan Fathers in Lugano and at the Collegium Helveticum in Milan, before studying theology in Como.

Riva was appointed dean (vicario foraneo) and coadjutor archpriest in 1780, then archpriest of Lugano from 1781 until his death in 1834. He early displayed Jansenist and democratic leanings. Together with other clergy, including the abbé Giuseppe Vanelli and Modesto Farina, he supported the political renewal of the bailiwicks and was close, in 1798, to the supporters of the Cisalpine Republic. Following anti-French disturbances in April 1799, he took refuge in Como for more than a year. On his return to Ticino, he worked for the defence of the political rights of the clergy.

== See also ==
- Riva family

== Bibliography ==
- Storia della famiglia Riva, vol. 1, 1971, pp. 314–320
- HS, II/1, p. 133
- F. Panzera, Società religiosa e società civile nel Ticino del primo Ottocento, 1989
