= Giovanni de Castelmur =

Swiss confectioner (1800–1871)

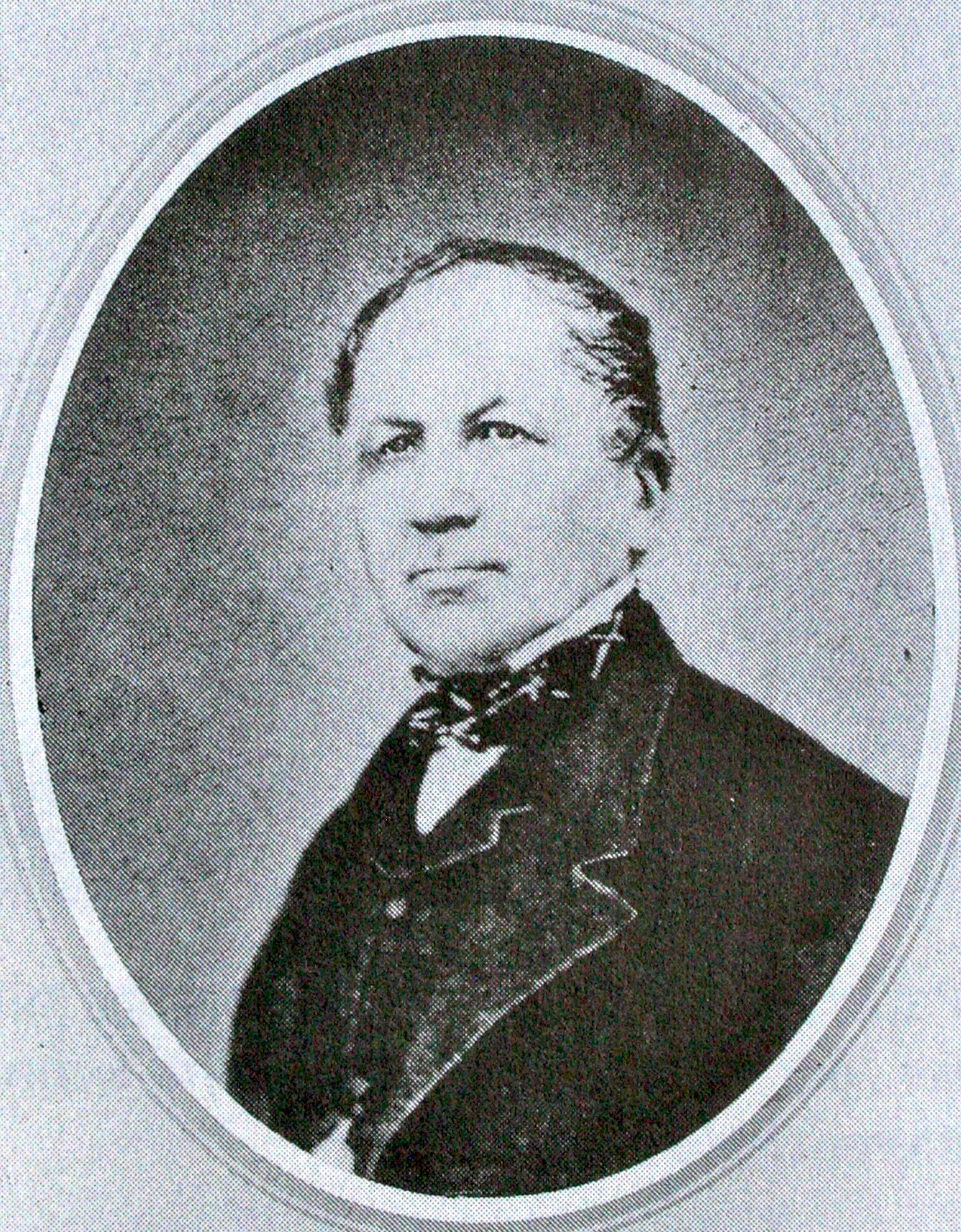
- Born: 8 January 1800; Stampa, Grisons
- Died: 24 June 1871 (aged 71); Nice, France
- Other name: Giovanni di Castelmur
- Occupation: Confectioner
- Spouse: Annetta de Castelmur (m. 1840)
- Parents: Antonio de Castelmur (father); Maria Stampa (mother)

Giovanni de Castelmur (8 January 1800 – 24 June 1871) was a Swiss confectioner from Stampa in the Bregaglia, a member of the Castelmur family. He ran his own confectionery in Nice, had the church of Nossa Donna above Promontogno restored and built the Palazzo Castelmur in Coltura. He translated Heinrich Zschokke's history of the Three Leagues into Italian, and around 1860, under Napoleon III, he was made a baron.

== Biography ==
Giovanni de Castelmur was born on 8 January 1800 in Stampa, now part of the municipality of Bregaglia, the son of Antonio de Castelmur, owner of a confectionery (Konditorei) in Marseille, and Maria Stampa. In 1840 he married Annetta de Castelmur, daughter of the podestà Giovanni de Castelmur, of Stampa.

After attending school in Marseille, Castelmur devoted himself to political science and law, and he ran his own confectionery in Nice. In 1839 he had the dilapidated church of Nossa Donna above Promontogno, at Castelmur, restored, and from 1840 he built the Palazzo Castelmur in Coltura. (Note: Sources disagree: according to the Centro Giacometti, the Palazzo was built in 1723 for Johannes Redolfi, and Giovanni de Castelmur enlarged it in 1850–1855.)

In 1830 Castelmur published Alcune riflessioni politiche ("Some political reflections"), and in 1836 he translated into Italian Heinrich Zschokke's two-volume Geschichte des Freistaats der drei Bünde im hohen Rhätien ("History of the Free State of the Three Leagues in High Rhaetia") of 1828. In 1863 he paid for the printing of the church hymnal Salmi e cantici sacri. Around 1860, under Napoleon III, he was made a baron (Freiherr) in recognition of his publications on social policy. He died in Nice on 24 June 1871.

== Works ==
- Alcune riflessioni politiche, 1830
- Heinrich Zschokke, Storia della Repubblica delle Tre Leghe nell'alta Rezia, 2 vols., 1836 (translated from the German by Giovanni de Castelmur)

== Bibliography ==
- Clito Fasciati, "Rund um die Akten im Palazzo de Castelmur in Coltura", in Bündner Monatsblatt, 1970, no. 7–8, 248–263
