= Melchior Jagmet =

Swiss politician (fl. 17th–18th century)

- Born: Disentis/Mustér, Graubünden
- Known for: Landamman of the Cadi, President of the Grey League

Melchior Jagmet (mentioned between 1687 and 1733) was a politician from Disentis/Mustér in the canton of Graubünden, active in the governance of the Grey League and the Valtellina during the late 17th and early 18th centuries.

== Family ==
Melchior Jagmet was the son of Flurin Jagmet, president of the Grey League. He married Maria Giani, daughter of Baron Giovanni Giacomo Giani, lieutenant of justice at Chiavenna, and of Caterina Filomena Caldelari, who descended from a distinguished line of notaries from Chiavenna. He was the brother-in-law of Regina Francesca Riva.

== Political career ==
Jagmet served as landamman of the Cadi (1687), president of the Grey League (Landrichter, 1690–1691 and 1696–1697), commissioner at Chiavenna (1699–1701), podestà of Piuro in the Valtellina (1703–1705), and governor-general of the Valtellina (1731–1733).

As leader of the pro-Habsburg faction in Graubünden, Jagmet was involved in 1696, during his presidency of the Grey League, in the confessional conflicts in the Valtellina and at Poschiavo (the Mainone affair), and in 1701 in the Sagogn affair.

== Bibliography ==
- Castelmur, Anton von: «Die Landrichter aus der Familie Jagmet und der Mainonehandel», in: Bündnerisches Monatsblatt, 1930/12, pp. 360–373.
- Maissen, Augustin: Die Landrichter des Grauen Bundes, 1424–1799. Siegel, Wappen, Biographien, 1990, pp. 89–90.
