= Raffaele Riva =

18th-century Swiss politician

- Born: 10 November 1741; Lugano
- Died: 26 February 1811 (aged 69); Lugano

Raffaele Riva (10 November 1741 – 26 February 1811) was a Swiss politician from Lugano. He served in various administrative roles in the bailiwick of Lugano and later as a deputy to the Grand Council of Ticino.

== Biography ==
Raffaele Riva was born in Lugano on 10 November 1741, the son of Giovanni Battista Riva, member and president of the town council, and Margherita Raimondi, from Como. He was the grandson of Giovanni Battista Riva (1646–1729). He held the title of count. He married twice: first to Regina Guicciardi, daughter of Francesco, and second in 1800 to Cecilia Bellasi, daughter of Giovanni Pietro.

He studied in Milan from 1757. He subsequently served as vice-bailiff secretary (1774), then as bailiff lieutenant and fiscal officer (1790, luogotenente del balivo e fiscale) of the Bailiwick of Lugano. In 1792, he was dismissed from his position for abuses committed at the expense of the community and condemned to a financial penalty by the sindicato.

In 1797, Riva took command of the red volunteers (volontari rossi), a militia recruited from the rural areas around Lugano, and was replaced the same year by Giulio Pocobelli. He subsequently served as a deputy to the Grand Council of Ticino from 1803 to 1808.

== See also ==
- Riva family

== Bibliography ==
- Storia della famiglia Riva, vol. 2, 1971, pp. 247–252.
- M. Schnyder, Tra nord e sud delle Alpi, thesis, Florence, 2008.
