= Castelmur Castle (Stampa) =

- Palazzo Castelmur
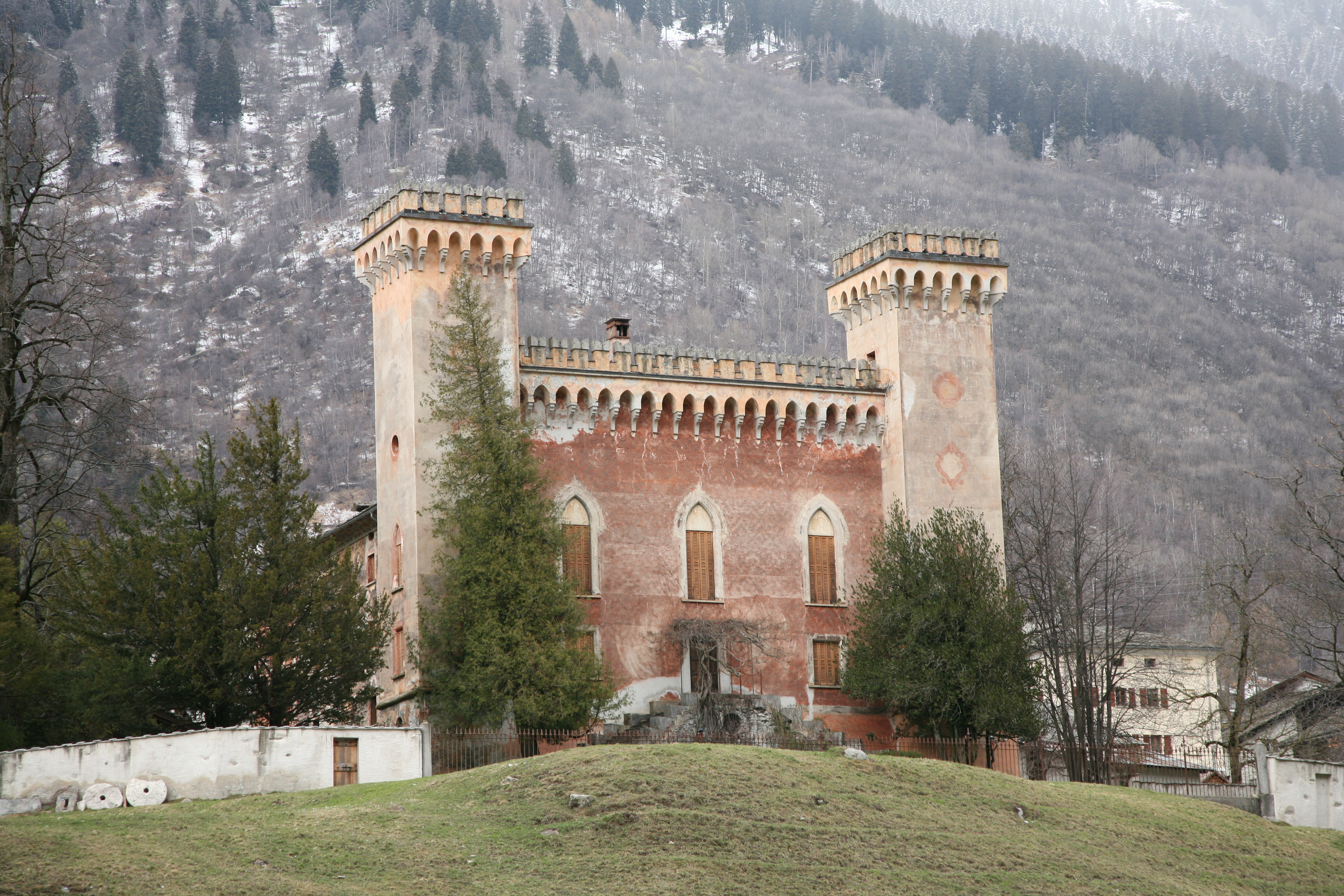
- Palazzo Castelmur

- Location within Canton of Graubünden Location within Switzerland

General information
- Type: Mansion
- Architectural style: Baroque, Neo-Gothic, Moorish
- Location: Bregaglia, Switzerland
- Coordinates: 46.3398°N 9.5617°E
- Construction started: 1723
- Renovated: 1850-1855
- Owner: Municipality of Bregaglia

Palazzo Castelmur or Castelmur Castle is a castle in the village of Stampa in the municipality of Bregaglia of the Canton of Graubünden in Switzerland. It is a Swiss heritage site of national significance.

== History ==
The Palazzo was built in 1723 for Johannes Redolfi. (Note: Sources disagree: the HDS biography of Giovanni de Castelmur says he built the Palazzo from 1840.) Around 1850 Baron Giovanni de Castelmur (1800-1871), a descendant of the Castelmur family from the nearby Castelmur Castle bought the Palazzo as well as the ruins of Castelmur Castle in Bondo. Giovanni was the son of a wealthy Marseille pastry shop owner, who after becoming a successful businessman returned to his family's ancestral village. At the age of 30 he became a property owner in the village, though it is still unclear how he managed to acquire his fortune or title. In 1840 he married his cousin Anna Castelmur (1813-1892) from the nearby village of Vicosoprano.

In 1850 Giovanni and Anna began the expansion and renovation of the old structure. Under the direction of Milanese architect Giovanni Crassi Marliani the exterior was redone in a Moorish inspired Neo-Gothic style. The brick front façade is flanked by two large towers, both the façade and towers crowned with machicolations and corbels. The older parts of the mansion were decorated with paneling and wall paper. The new additions were decorated in the Louis Philippe style with Rococo and Biedermeier elements. The walls are covered with ornate murals and silk wallpaper. Many of the ceilings were covered with trompe-l'œil paintings by Gaspare Tirinanzi and wall paintings by Zaverio Tessera. The Palazzo was surrounded with an English garden and a 2 m (6.6 ft) tall wall.

Both Giovanni and Anna were patrons of the arts and philanthropists who supported many organizations in the region. As the couple never had children, after Anna's death the Palazzo was inherited by other relatives. In 1961 the heirs sold the castle and surrounding lands to the local government of the Circolo di Bregaglia. The local government converted it into a museum. On the second floor is the Archivio Storico, an archive that stores and researches documents relating to the Val Bregaglia region. Additionally on the second floor there is a permanent exhibit dedicated to the history of Graubünden's pastry bakers, a tribute to Giovanni's upbringing.

== Gallery ==
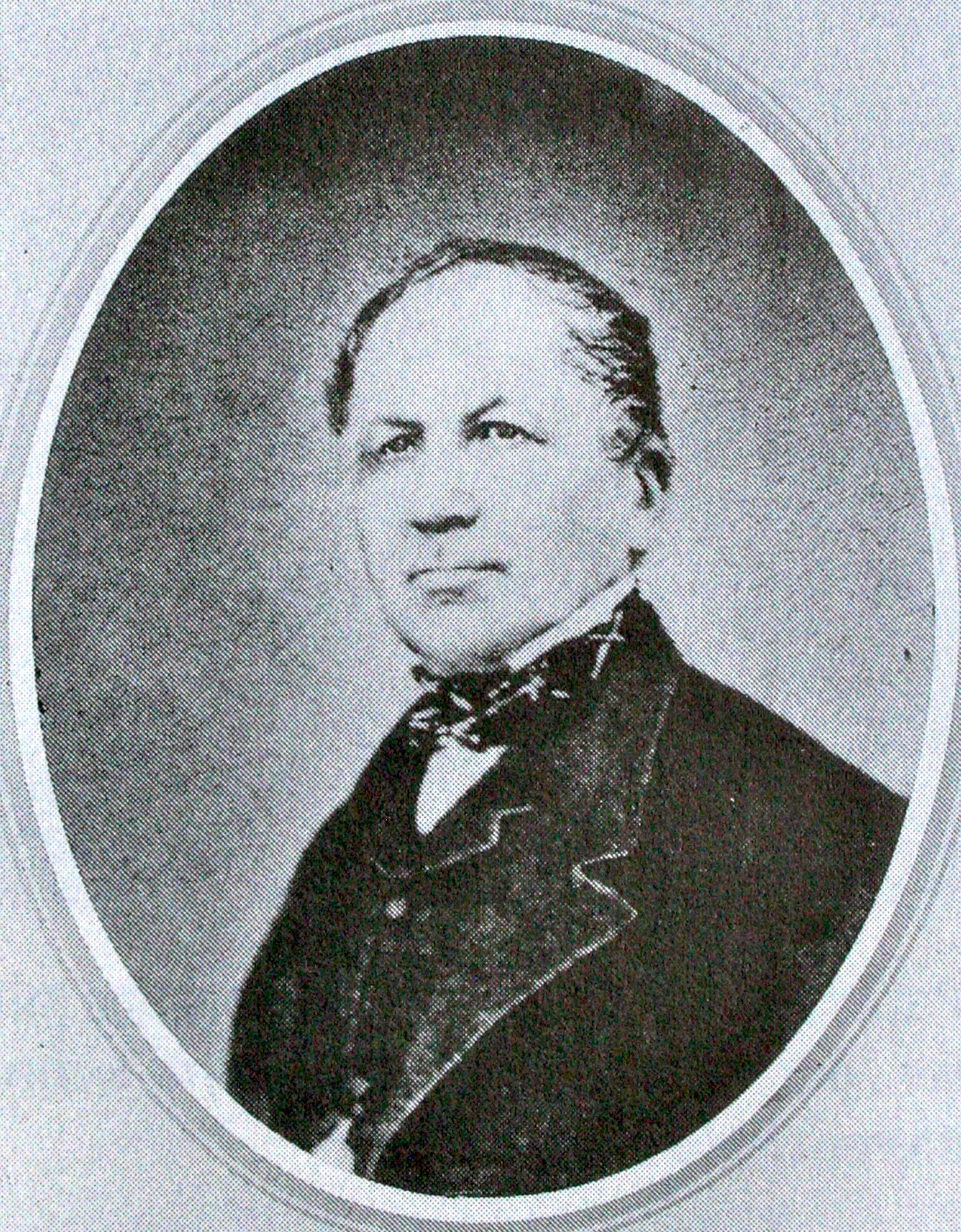
Giovanni de Castelmur

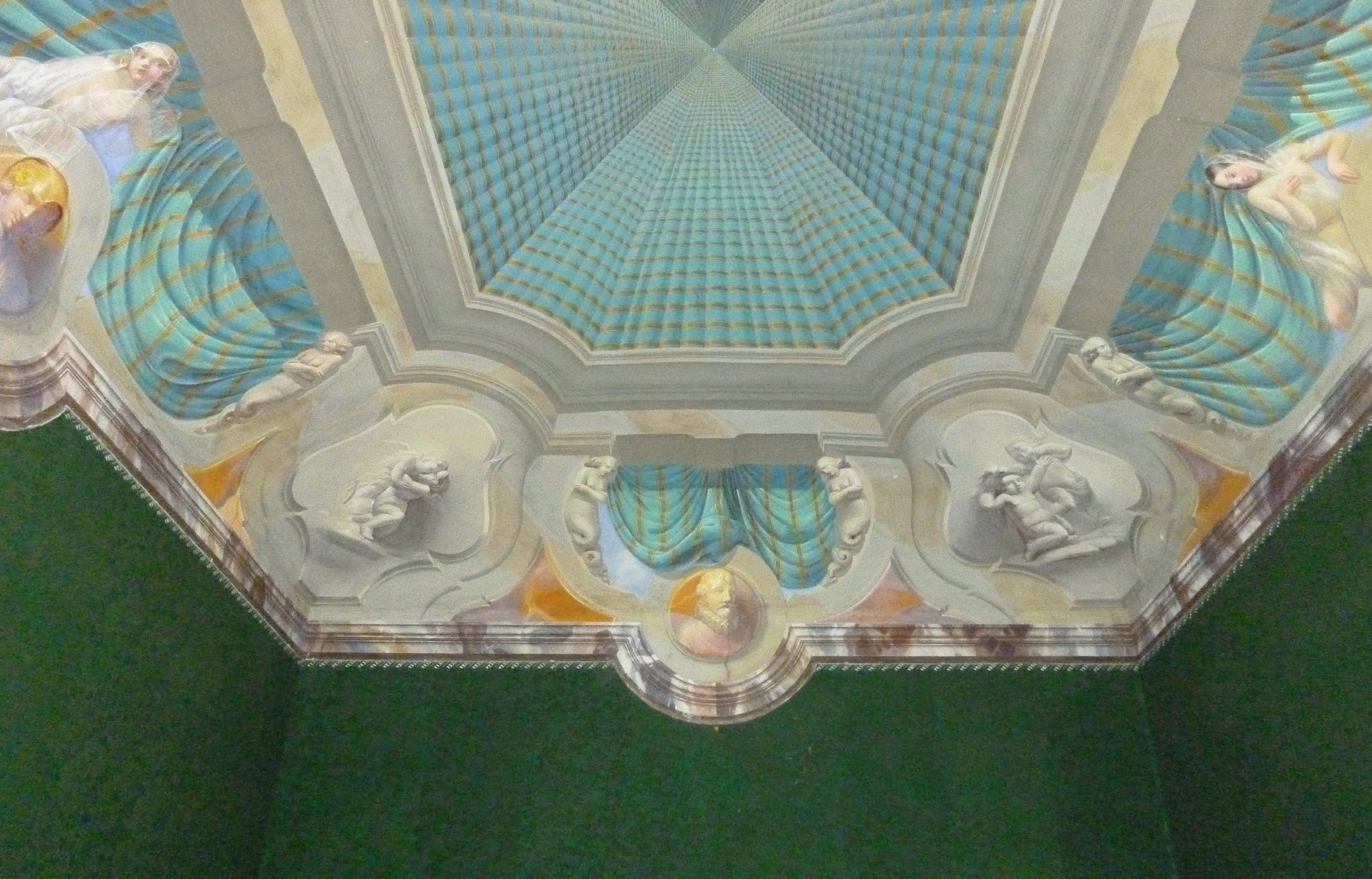
Trompe-l'œil illusions on the ceiling

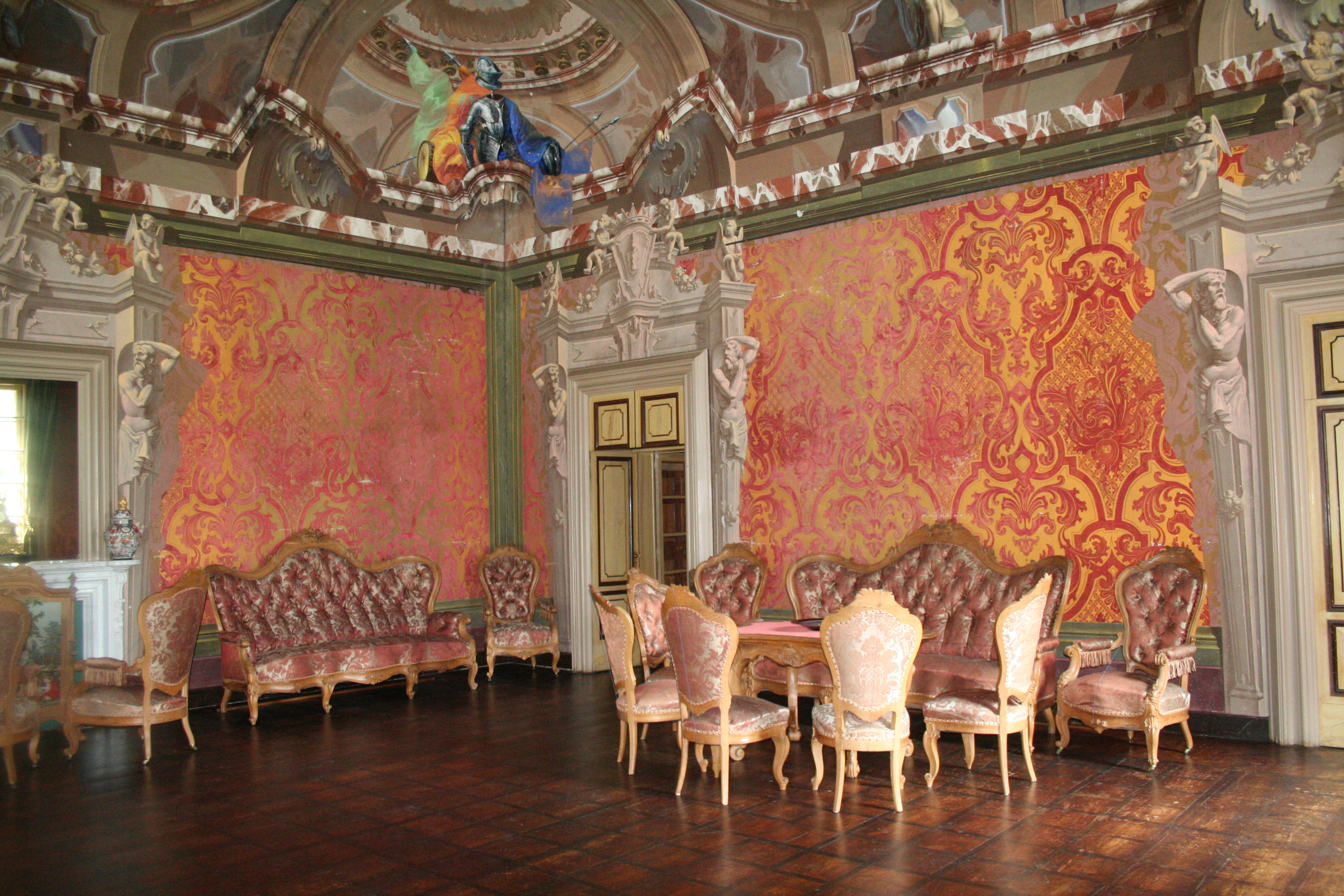
The Grand Salon in the Palazzo

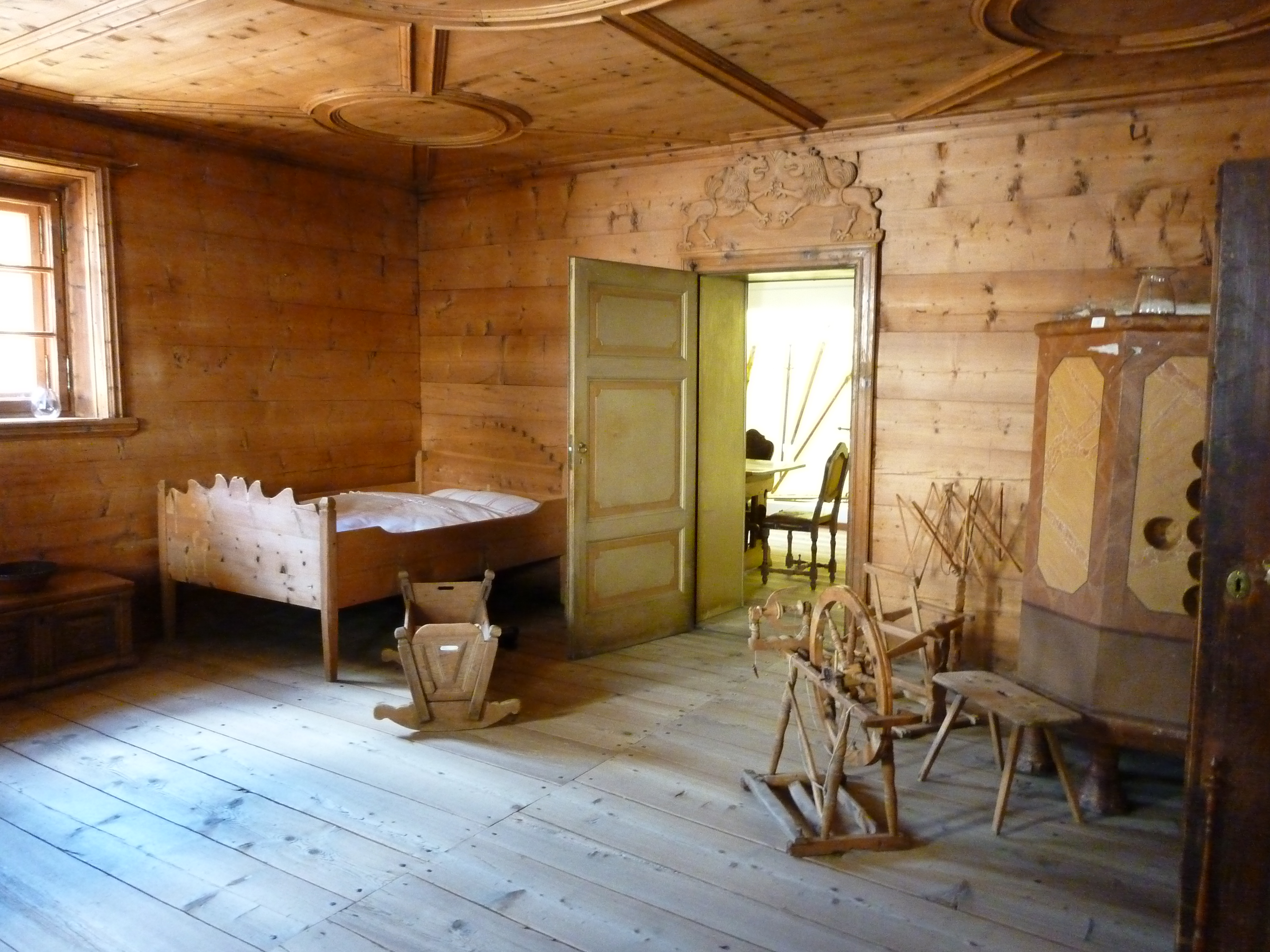
A room on the ground floor

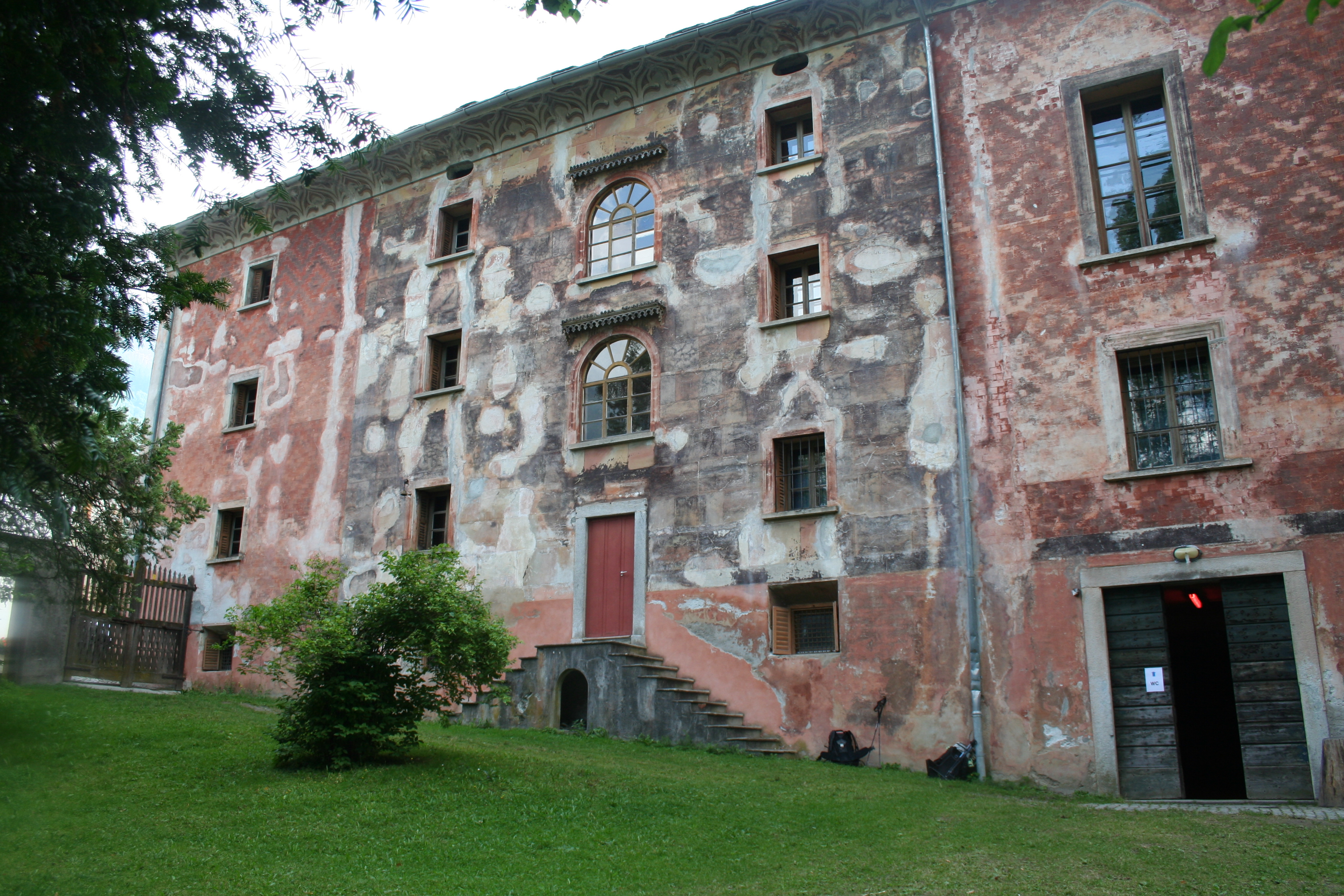
Westside exterior

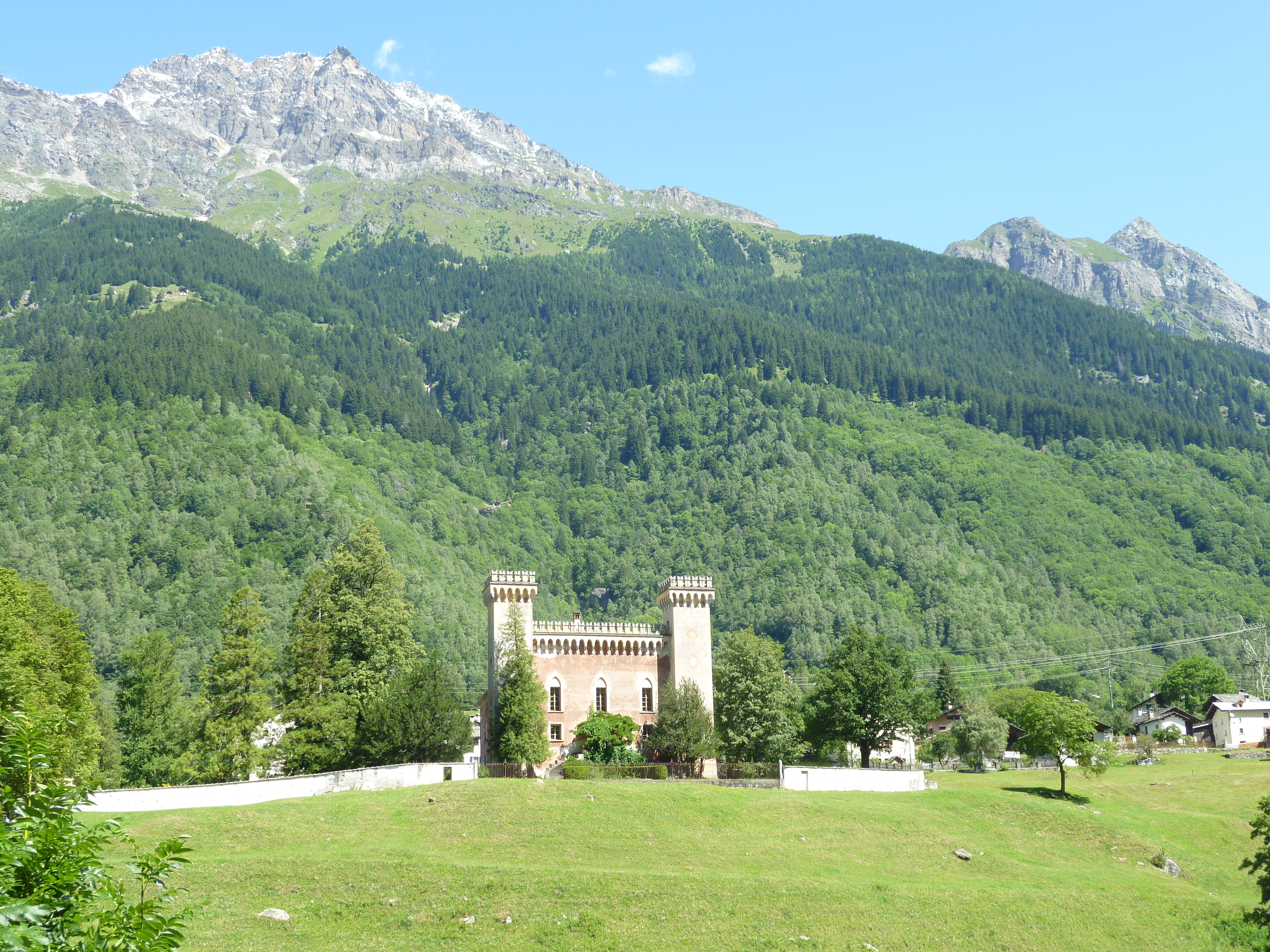
Exterior and surroundings

== See also ==
- List of castles in Switzerland
