= Stefano Riva (merchant) =

Merchant and councillor from Lugano (1625–1714)

- Born: Lugano, Swiss Confederacy
- Died: 3 November 1714; Lugano
- Occupations: Merchant, councillor
- Spouse: Stella Caterina de Papis (m. 1651)

Stefano Riva (1625 – 3 November 1714) was a merchant and member of the town council of Lugano, active in the late seventeenth and early eighteenth centuries. He is considered the ancestor of the noble branch of the Riva family.

== Biography ==
Stefano Riva was born in 1625 in Lugano, the son of Giovanni Battista Riva (1695–1777) and Maddalena Somazzi. In 1651, he married Stella Caterina de Papis; they had 15 children, among whom were nuns, clerics, and the Somascan father Carlo Francesco Antonio Riva. His grandson was Giovanni Battista Riva (1695–1777) and his great-grandson Stefano Riva (1736–1790).

As a merchant — he is consistently described as such in contemporary documents — Riva was among the most heavily taxed traders in the registers of 1706 and subsequent years. In the 1736 land register (cadastre), his descendants appear as the most taxed residents of the borough, suggesting they were among the wealthiest. Beyond trade, Riva was also active in the real estate and credit markets in the Lugano and Mendrisiotto regions. His lending activity was particularly intense in the Malcantone, especially in Cademario, during the last three decades of the seventeenth century. Together with his brother Antonio and his nephew Giovanni Battista Riva (1646–1729), he played an important role in the family's social and economic ascent. As a member of one of the principal lineages of the community (vicinia), he sat on the town council.

Riva participated actively in the confraternity life of the borough — he was affiliated with the confraternity of Saint Roch — and was closely associated with the Capuchin order as a member of the third order (fratelanza). He displayed characteristics typical of the nobility of his time: strict regarding the matrimonial choices of his descendants and prepared to punish disobedience — in his will, he threatened to disinherit his daughter Anna Maddalena Riva, who had eloped to marry clandestinely — while at the same time attentive to the principle of community of goods and harmony within the family.

== See also ==
- Riva family

== Bibliography ==
- Fidecommesso Riva (éd.): Storia della famiglia Riva, 3 vol., 1972–1993.
- Schnyder, Marco: «Cademario tra Sei e Settecento. Flussi di potere e governo di un territorio», in: Panzera, Fabrizio (éd.): Cademario. Dall'antichità al terzo millennio, 2008, pp. 51–71.
- Schnyder, Marco: Famiglie e potere. Il ceto dirigente di Lugano e Mendrisio tra Sei e Settecento, 2011.
