= Bartholomäus von Castelmur =

Grisons cleric (c. 1490–1552)

- Born: c. 1490
- Died: before 23 February 1552
- Education: University of Orléans
- Occupation: Cleric

Bartholomäus von Castelmur (c. 1490 – before 23 February 1552) was a cleric from the Grisons, of the Manus line of the Castelmur family. A canon of the cathedral chapter of Chur, he defended the Catholic faith at the Ilanz Disputation of 1526, was twice vicar general in Chur and became abbot of St. Luzi. In the episcopal election of 1549 he lost to Thomas Planta.

== Biography ==
Bartholomäus von Castelmur was born around 1490 and belonged to the Manus line of the Castelmur family. In 1512 he obtained a licentiate in both laws (lic. iur. utr.) in Orléans.

In 1517 Castelmur became a canon of the cathedral chapter of Chur, in 1521 parish priest in Malans, and in 1523 in Riom. At the Ilanz Disputation of 1526 he appeared as a determined defender of the Catholic faith. From 1527 to 1530 he was vicar general in Chur, and from 1535 to 1540 parish priest in Altdorf (Uri) and dean of the chapter of the Waldstätte (Waldstätter Kapitel).

As dean of the cathedral chapter in Chur, Castelmur initiated a revision of its statutes in 1541 and attempted a far-reaching reform to save the old faith in the Grisons. From 1542 he was first administrator and later abbot of St. Luzi in Chur.

As a candidate for bishop, Castelmur lost to Thomas Planta in 1549. He recognized Planta only after the papal confirmation, and then became his vicar general (1549–1552). He died before 23 February 1552.

== Bibliography ==
- Helvetia Sacra, I/1, 527, 553
- G. Capaul, Das Domkapitel von Chur 1541–1581, 1973
