= Castelmur family =

Aristocratic family of the Grisons

Castelmur family von Castelmur
- Ministeriales and aristocrats
- Country: Switzerland
- Current region: Grisons
- Origin: Bregaglia
- Founded: 1190 (first record)
- Founder: Gaudenz de Castromuro
- Members: Jacob von Castelmur; Bartholomäus von Castelmur; Giovanni de Castelmur; Anton von Castelmur
- Estates: Castelmur (fief of the bishop of Chur); Girsberg Castle (1525–1533); Rietberg Castle (in pledge); Palazzo Castelmur, Coltura

The Castelmur family (von Castelmur) is a family of ministeriales and aristocrats of the Grisons, from the Bregaglia. It is recorded from 1190 as holding the fortress of Castelmur as a fief from the bishop of Chur. A long series of notaries from the family, beginning in 1319, helped it to rise from a family of episcopal vassals to a leading aristocratic family in the League of God's House. Its influence declined rapidly in the later 16th century.

== History ==
The family's origins probably lie in the de Vicosoprano family, which is recorded from 1096 to 1304. In 1190 Albertus de Castello Muro is first recorded as holding the fortress of Castelmur, which belonged to the bishop of Chur, as a fief. Gaudenz de Castromuro, mentioned at about the same time, is regarded as the progenitor of the family. As episcopal ministeriales the von Castelmur repeatedly acted as mediators and as sealers (Siegler) of documents; they held numerous fiefs in the Bregaglia, and from the 13th century they had a burial place in Chur Cathedral. At the same time they were also ministeriales of the Benedictine abbey of Pfäfers. The division into the two main lines of the Scolaren and the Manus can already be seen in the 13th century, but it is not always clear to which line individual members belonged.

With Jacobus, son of Tobias, the long series of Bregaglia notaries from the Castelmur family began in 1319. This work helped the family to keep high positions through the valley's efforts toward autonomy and often to hold the office of podestà. It also allowed the family to develop from a family of episcopal vassals into a leading aristocratic family in the League of God's House, to which deliberate marriages also contributed.

The Domleschg line was founded through the marriage of Albert to Elisabeth Baff von Fürstenau. Albert's son Rudolf was the bishop's bailiff (Vogt) at Fürstenau from 1413 to 1428. He was followed by Schwiggli in 1429, Rudolf from 1470 to 1471, Joachim from 1473 to 1491, Jacob from 1524 to 1526, and Gaudenz from 1528 to 1537 and from 1540 to 1542. During the Swabian War in 1499 Joachim was one of the three regents of the prince-bishopric of Chur. His son Gaudenz owned Girsberg Castle, in Zurich territory, from 1525 to 1533 and was one of the sealers of the First Peace of Kappel. Both Joachim and Gaudenz married women from the Humpis family, merchants of Ravensburg. Gaudenz's sister was abbess of the convent of Müstair from 1510 to 1534. Schwiggli, mentioned above, was bailiff at Strassberg from 1437 to 1448, and Jacob held Rietberg Castle in pledge. The von Castelmur provided several cathedral canons, among them Bartholomäus.

In the 15th century a Stecker-Corn-Menusi line appeared, which provided several Grisons envoys, judges and officials in the Valtellina. It was the only line of the family to turn to the Reformation. In the later 16th century the influence of the von Castelmur in the League of God's House declined rapidly, and after a dispute with the Salis in the 1560s their political position in the Bregaglia also faded. Some branches died out and others moved away. Jacob Corn von Castelmur founded the Vienna line at the beginning of the 17th century, and another line made its fortune in Marseille with Giovanni. The Stampa branch and the Tumegl/Tomils branch, the latter including Anton, continue to live in Switzerland.

Giovanni (1800–1871), who was born in Stampa, had the ruined church of Nossa Donna above Promontogno restored in 1839, and from 1840 he built the Palazzo Castelmur in Coltura. (Note: Sources disagree: according to the Centro Giacometti, the Palazzo was built in 1723 for Johannes Redolfi, and Giovanni de Castelmur enlarged it in 1850–1855.)

== Bibliography ==
- P. N. von Salis, Die Bergeller Vasallengeschlechter, 1921
- Schweizerisches Geschlechterbuch, vol. 5, pp. 116–123
- P. E. Grimm, Die Anfänge der Bündner Aristokratie im 15. und 16. Jahrhundert, 1981
- G. Pool, "Bergeller Notare", in Jahrbuch der Historischen Gesellschaft von Graubünden, 113, 1983, pp. 63–154

=== Archives ===
- Staatsarchiv Graubünden (State Archives of the Grisons), Chur, family archives
