= Jacob von Castelmur =

Bregaglia nobleman (fl. 1367–1403)

- Other name: Jakob von Castelmur
- Years active: 1367–1403 (recorded)
- Relatives: Ulrich Minusch and Jacob Scolaris (cousins)

Jacob von Castelmur (recorded 1367–1403) was a member of the Manus line of the Castelmur family from the Bregaglia. In 1367 he was one of the sealers of the League of God's House for the Bregaglia. In 1387 the bishop of Chur commissioned him to make the Septimer Pass passable for wagons, and in 1398 the bishop gave him Rietberg Castle as a pledge.

== Biography ==
Jacob von Castelmur is recorded between 1367 and 1403. He belonged to the Manus line of the Castelmur family. In 1367, together with his cousins Ulrich Minusch and Jacob Scolaris, he sealed the League of God's House for the Bregaglia.

In 1387 the bishop of Chur, facing the threat of competition from an expansion of the Lukmanier Pass, commissioned Castelmur to make the Septimer Pass passable for wagons and to maintain it in return for a toll (Weglöse). The road was built, but it remained passable for only a few years.

In 1398 Castelmur received Rietberg Castle in the Domleschg from the bishop as a pledge.

== Bibliography ==
- A. Planta, Verkehrswege im alten Rätien, vol. 2, 1986
