= Untervogt =

Local representative of a bailiff in Swiss cantons

The Untervogt (plural: Untervögte) was the local representative of the sovereign bailiff (Landvogt) in the bailiwicks of several Confederate cantons, including Basel, the Bernese part of Aargau, the Bernese Vaud, Freiburg, Lucerne, Schaffhausen, Solothurn, Schwyz, Zug, and Zurich. He could act for an entire bailiwick (Amts- or Grafschaftsuntervogt) or for a single judicial district within it (Gerichtsuntervogt). In the Bernese Vaud, the equivalent officer was known as the lieutenant baillival. The position of Amtsuntervogt was the highest office accessible to a subject.

== Appointment ==
The council appointed the Amtsuntervogt from among several candidates who had proven themselves in earlier offices, proposed either by the Landvogt (Basel, Bernese Aargau, Schaffhausen) or by the local subjects (Zurich). The selection of a shortlist of three candidates in the Zurich bailiwicks was sometimes accompanied by bribery.

== Functions ==
The Untervogt presided over the lower court (Niedergericht) in place of the Landvogt. He acted as a notary, conducted civil proceedings (bankruptcies, auctions, inventories, estate divisions), and participated in criminal proceedings through his powers of complaint and investigation. He was also called upon for various administrative and policing duties, including the collection of taxes and levies, the gathering of statistics, and the preparation of reports. As the chief local agent of the authorities, he was responsible for executing government mandates. His close dealings with the Landvogt positioned him as a potential advocate for communities and subjects, but also exposed him to conflicts of loyalty.

== Status and remuneration ==
Outward signs of the Untervogt's authority typically included official dress in the cantonal colours (as in Zurich) and an honorary seat in church. His remuneration consisted of a modest fixed salary, payments in kind, use rights, and fees. He generally held office for life; dismissal — usually for moral or ethical misconduct — was rare.

== Recruitment and tenure ==
Untervögte were often recruited from locally influential urban notables (including most lieutenants baillivaux in Vaud) or from prosperous farmers, millers, and innkeepers, although the appointment of millers and innkeepers was partly prohibited by mandate (Basel-Stadt, Zurich). In the 17th and 18th centuries, it was not uncommon for the office to pass effectively within a family from one generation to the next.

== Bibliography ==
- E. W. Kunz, Die lokale Selbstverwaltung in den zürcherischen Landgemeinden im 18. Jahrhundert, 1948.
