= Francesco Saverio Riva =

18th-century Swiss nobleman and man of letters

- Born: 30 September 1702; Lugano, Old Swiss Confederacy
- Died: 27 July 1783 (aged 80); Lugano, Old Swiss Confederacy
- Other name: Siredo (pseudonym)
- Occupations: Count abbé, administrator, man of letters
- Known for: Member of the Accademia dell'Arcadia, patron of religious communities
- Relatives: Giovanni Battista Riva (father); Lucrezia Morosini (mother); Antonio Riva (brother); Rodolfo Giovanni Riva (brother); Gian Pietro Riva (brother); Regina Francesca Riva (sister-in-law)

Francesco Saverio Riva (30 September 1702 – 27 July 1783) was a Swiss count abbot, lord of Mauensee, administrator of the family estate, and literary man. A member of the influential Riva family of Lugano, he was known for his activities in estate management, his membership in the Accademia dell'Arcadia, and his patronage of religious communities.

== Early life and education ==
Francesco Saverio Riva was the youngest of 17 children of Giovanni Battista Riva, one of the most influential magistrates of Lugano, and Lucrezia Morosini, who also belonged to one of the most powerful families of the town. His brothers included Antonio Riva and Rodolfo Giovanni Riva, both bailiff lieutenants, and Gian Pietro Riva, a writer; Regina Francesca Riva was his sister-in-law. After attending the college of Sant'Antonio in Lugano, run by the Somascans, and the ducal college of Modena, Riva studied at the University of Pavia, where he obtained a degree in civil and canon law in 1723. He continued his education in Rome, but was forced to return home, probably due to poor health.

As an unordained cleric, he always bore the title of count abbot, combining the comital dignity inherited from his father with his ecclesiastical status. Through his father, he was also a member of the patriciate of the city of Lucerne and lord of Mauensee.

== Estate management and architecture ==
A multifaceted personality, Riva administered a portion of the considerable family estate. He was particularly active in the land (land ownership) and credit sectors in various communities of the bailiwicks of Lugano and Mendrisio; these activities had significant repercussions on the prestige and power of his lineage. Between 1732 and 1752, he had his palace built in the district of Verla (Santa Margherita), one of the finest examples of late Baroque civil architecture in the Italian bailiwicks. He also owned a casa da nobile (noble house) and numerous lands in Besazio, which he had chosen as a place of residence.

== Literary activity and patronage ==
Passionate about philosophy and literature, Riva maintained extensive correspondence, particularly with the philo-Jansenist Francesco Brembati of Bergamo. Under the pseudonym Siredo, he was a member of the Accademia dell'Arcadia, a literary movement that advocated a return to classicism in reaction to "the disorder and bad taste" of the Baroque. He used his contacts within the Republic of Letters also to help members of his family and young emigrants from the bailiwicks.

He distinguished himself as a benefactor and protector of various confraternities (particularly the young Society of the Sacred Heart) and several religious communities of Lugano (especially the Capuchins of the convent of the Holy Trinity and the Augustinians of Santa Margherita, of which his niece Vittoria Marianna Riva was mother superior). Riva was notably commissioned by the Bishop of Como to evaluate the economic management of the Augustinian convent which, in the mid-18th century, was considered highly problematic. He also prudently arbitrated conflicts, both public (in the town and rural communities) and private (within his family).

== Death ==
He died in Lugano and was buried in the church of Saint Anthony.

== See also ==
- Riva family

== Bibliography ==
- Fidecommesso Riva (ed.): Storia della famiglia Riva, 3 vols., 1972–1993.
- Schnyder, Marco: "Un nobile ecclesiastico nella sua comunità", in: Bollettino storico della Svizzera italiana, 2004/1, pp. 149–170.
- Schnyder, Marco: Famiglie e potere. Il ceto dirigente di Lugano e Mendrisio tra Sei e Settecento, 2011.
- Martinoli, Simona: Il palazzo Riva di Santa Margherita a Lugano e la sua quadreria, 2014, especially pp. 92–94.
- Agustoni, Edoardo; Pedrini Stanga, Lucia (ed.): Dentro i palazzi. Uno sguardo sul collezionismo privato nella Lugano del Sette e Ottocento. Le quadrerie Riva, 2020.
