= Giovanni Battista Riva (jurist) =

Swiss nobleman and jurist (1646–1729)

- Born: 24 December 1646; Lugano
- Died: 17 December 1729 (aged 82); Lugano
- Occupations: Notary, jurist, member of the Council of the borough of Lugano, Untervogt
- Title: Count and lord of Mauensee

Giovanni Battista Riva (24 December 1646 – 17 December 1729) was a Luganese nobleman, jurist, and member of the patriciate of Lucerne. He served as a member of the Council of the borough of Lugano and as an Untervogt. He was granted the hereditary title of Count by Francesco Farnese, Duke of Parma in 1698 and later acquired the lordship of Mauensee near Sursee.

== Biography ==
=== Origins and family ===
Giovanni Battista Riva was born on 24 December 1646 in Lugano. He was the son of (Giovanni) Antonio Riva, notary and procurator, and of Vittoria Somazzi, a noblewoman of Lugano, and the nephew of the merchant Stefano Riva. He attended the Jesuit college in Lucerne (attested in 1660) and obtained a law degree.

In 1672, he married Lucrezia Morosini, the only daughter of Giovanni Pietro Morosini — president of the Council of the community of Lugano, Untervogt, and customs farmer — who had not entered a convent. Seventeen children were born from this union, of whom only four married: among them Antonio Riva and Rodolfo Giovanni Riva, both Untervogt. The others either died in infancy or entered religious life, including Gian Pietro Riva and Francesco Saverio Riva, who also distinguished themselves as men of letters. Vittoria Marianna Riva, mother superior of the Augustinian convent of Santa Margherita in Lugano, mentioned in 1726 in Giovanni Battista Riva's will, was his granddaughter.

=== Career and activities ===
A skilled procurator and notary, Riva was a member of the Council of the borough of Lugano from 1679 to 1697 and held the prestigious function of Untervogt. He acted as a mediator in private disputes and conflicts between rural communities, and also participated in negotiations with the Duchy of Milan concerning cereal imports in 1683. He inherited the palace in the Cioccaro quarter — purchased by his father and still standing — where he resided for his entire life. He was highly active in the land, real estate, and credit markets in the Lugano and Mendrisiotto regions.

In 1691, he and his descendants were admitted to the patriciate of the city of Lucerne, a right granted in recognition of his father's military merits — the elder Riva had fought alongside the Lucernese during the First War of Villmergen (1656) — and of the contacts Giovanni Battista Riva had cultivated with the local elite.

=== Title and lordship ===
Following his father's example, who had created a fideicommis in 1675, Riva established one in 1694 to prevent the fragmentation of the family patrimony and to maintain family unity. In 1698, François Farnèse, Duke of Parma, Piacenza and Castro, conferred upon him the hereditary title of count. This distinction caused tensions in Lugano: in 1706, some inhabitants of the borough unsuccessfully attempted to prevent its use in official documents. Riva contributed decisively not only to strengthening the social and economic position of his lineage in the bailiwicks of Lugano and Mendrisio, but also to forging solid and lasting ties with Confederate, Lucernese, and Lombard elites — as evidenced by the marriage of his son Antonio Riva to Regina Francesca Giani. In 1721, he purchased the lordship of Mauensee near Sursee in the canton of Lucerne, comprising a manor house and farmland leased to local tenants, demonstrating the influence his family had acquired beyond the Alps.

=== Death and burial ===
Riva died on 17 December 1729 in Lugano. In accordance with his testamentary provisions, his funeral was attended by the secular and regular clergy, confraternities, and civil authorities. He was interred in the family vault in the church of Sant'Antonio in Lugano.

== See also ==
- Riva family

== Bibliography ==
=== Archival sources ===
- Archivio storico della città di Lugano, Lugano, Fondo Famiglia Riva.
- Staatsarchiv Luzern, Lucerne, Bürgergemeinde Luzern; Ratsprotokolle.

=== Secondary sources ===
- Fidecommesso Riva (ed.): Storia della famiglia Riva, vol. 2, 1972, pp. 14–48.
- Schnyder, Marco: Famiglie e potere. Il ceto dirigente di Lugano e Mendrisio tra Sei e Settecento, 2011.
- Martinoli, Simona (ed.): Il palazzo Riva di Santa Margherita a Lugano e la sua quadreria, 2014, pp. 75–79.
- Agustoni, Edoardo; Pedrini Stanga, Lucia (eds.): Dentro i palazzi. Uno sguardo sul collezionismo privato nella Lugano del Sette e Ottocento: le quadrerie Riva, 2020.
