= Anton von Castelmur =

Swiss historian (1897–1938)

- Born: 20 August 1897; Chur, Grisons, Switzerland
- Died: 13 April 1938 (aged 40); Schwyz, Switzerland
- Education: ETH Zurich; University of Zurich; University of Fribourg
- Occupations: Historian; teacher
- Parents: Luzius Anton von Castelmur (father); Anna Maria Elisabeth Mettier (mother)

Anton von Castelmur (20 August 1897 – 13 April 1938) was a Swiss medievalist and teacher, a member of the Castelmur family. After studying in Zurich and Fribourg, he taught at the Kollegium Maria Hilf in Schwyz and at the cantonal school in Lucerne. He wrote numerous works on the history of the church and of the nobility in Switzerland and in the Grisons.

== Biography ==
Anton von Castelmur was born on 20 August 1897 in Chur, the son of Luzius Anton von Castelmur, a chancery secretary (Kanzleisekretär), and Anna Maria Elisabeth Mettier, of Langwies. He belonged to the Tumegl/Tomils branch of the Castelmur family.

Castelmur attended the Gymnasium in Chur and studied mathematics at the Federal Institute of Technology in Zurich. He then studied history and the auxiliary sciences of history in Zurich and Fribourg, and he obtained his doctorate (Dr. phil.) in 1921. He completed his training at the papal secret archive (päpstliches Geheimarchiv, now the Vatican Apostolic Archive) in Rome and at the École des chartes in Paris.

From 1929 to 1936 Castelmur was a teacher at the Kollegium Maria Hilf in Schwyz, and from 1936 to 1938 at the cantonal school (Kantonsschule) in Lucerne.

Castelmur was an important medievalist who wrote numerous works on the history of the church and of the nobility in Switzerland and in the Grisons. He died in Schwyz on 13 April 1938.

== Works ==
- Conradin von Marmels und seine Zeit, 1922
- Der alte Schweizerbund, 1937 (with P. Hilber)
- Die Burgen und Schlösser des Kantons Graubünden, 3 vols., 1940–1944

== Bibliography ==
- Der Freie Rätier, no. 98, 28 April 1938
- G. Staffelbach, "Prof. Dr. Anton v. Castelmur, 1897–1938", in Jahresbericht der höhern Lehranstalt Luzern, 1938, 1–19 (with a list of works)

=== Archives ===
- Bischöfliches Archiv Chur (Episcopal Archives of Chur), Chur, papers (Nachlass)
