= Antonio Riva (politician, born 1678) =

Swiss politician (1678–1765)

- Born: 23 July 1678; Lugano, Old Swiss Confederacy
- Died: 15 June 1765 (aged 86); Lugano, Old Swiss Confederacy
- Occupations: Politician, jurist
- Title: Count and Lord of Mauensee
- Spouse: Francesca Regina Giani (m. 1701)
- Father: Giovanni Battista Riva
- Relatives: Francesco Saverio Riva (brother); Gian Pietro Riva (brother); Rodolfo Giovanni Riva (brother)

Antonio Riva (23 July 1678 – 15 June 1765) was a Swiss politician and jurist from Lugano. He was count and lord of Mauensee and held several political positions in Lugano during the first half of the 18th century.

== Biography ==
Antonio Riva was born on 23 July 1678 in Lugano to Giovanni Battista Riva. He was Catholic and from Lugano, with the family probably originating from Lucerne and Milan (documented in 1728). He was the brother of Francesco Saverio Riva, Gian Pietro Riva, and Rodolfo Giovanni Riva. In 1701, he married Francesca Regina Giani, daughter of Baron Giovanni Giacomo of Novate (now Novate Mezzola, Lombardy).

After attending the Jesuit college in Lucerne in 1694, Riva undertook university-level legal studies in Parma.

== Political career ==
Riva served as a member of the Council of the Borough on several occasions between 1707 and 1751, and also held the position of president of the council. He additionally served as lieutenant bailiff, captain general of the Lugano militia, and fiscal officer. He consolidated his family's economic interests, particularly in Lombardy.

== See also ==
- Riva family

== Bibliography ==
- Storia della famiglia Riva, vol. 2, 1971, pp. 53–68
- Schnyder, M., Tra nord e sud delle Alpi, thesis, Florence, 2008
