= Gian Pietro Riva =

Italian-Swiss poet and translator

- Born: 18 October 1696; Lugano, Swiss Confederation
- Died: 19 December 1785 (aged 89); Lugano
- Occupations: Poet, translator, teacher

Gian Pietro Riva (18 October 1696 – 19 December 1785) was a Lugano-born poet and translator who contributed to the renewal of 18th-century Italian theatre, particularly through his translations of Molière. He was the son of Giovanni Battista Riva and the brother of Antonio Riva, Francesco Saverio Riva, and Rodolfo Giovanni Riva. He held the title of Count.

== Life and career ==
Riva attended the Collegio Sant'Antonio in Lugano, where he later taught. He subsequently worked as a schoolmaster in institutions run by the Congregation of the Somaschans in Pavia and Como, and later at the Accademia del Porto in Bologna. The Bolognese milieu had a profound influence on his personality and work.

== Literary work ==
Riva was a prolific poet, writing numerous pieces, chiefly in the form of eulogies. He used the pseudonym Rosmano Lapiteio as a member of the Arcadian Academy. He contributed to a verse adaptation of the Storia di Bertoldo (1736) and engaged in religious literature with the poetry collection Atti di San Girolamo Miani (1767), as well as translating various sacred and contemplative texts.

He contributed to the renewal of 18th-century Italian theatre by translating Antoine de La Fosse's Thésée, Racine's Iphigénie, and, most notably, the comedies of Molière. Out of respect for his congregation, the Molière translations were largely not published; exceptions were The Miser and Le Mariage forcé.

== See also ==
- Riva family

== Bibliography ==
- G. Orelli, «La Svizzera italiana», in Letteratura italiana. Storia e geografia. L'età contemporanea, ed. A. Asor Rosa, vol. 3, 1989, pp. 885–918.
- L. Maggi Notarangelo, Gian Pietro Riva, traduttore di Molière, 1990.
