= Castelmur Castle (Bondo) =

Castle in Switzerland

- Ruine Castelmur
- Bregaglia
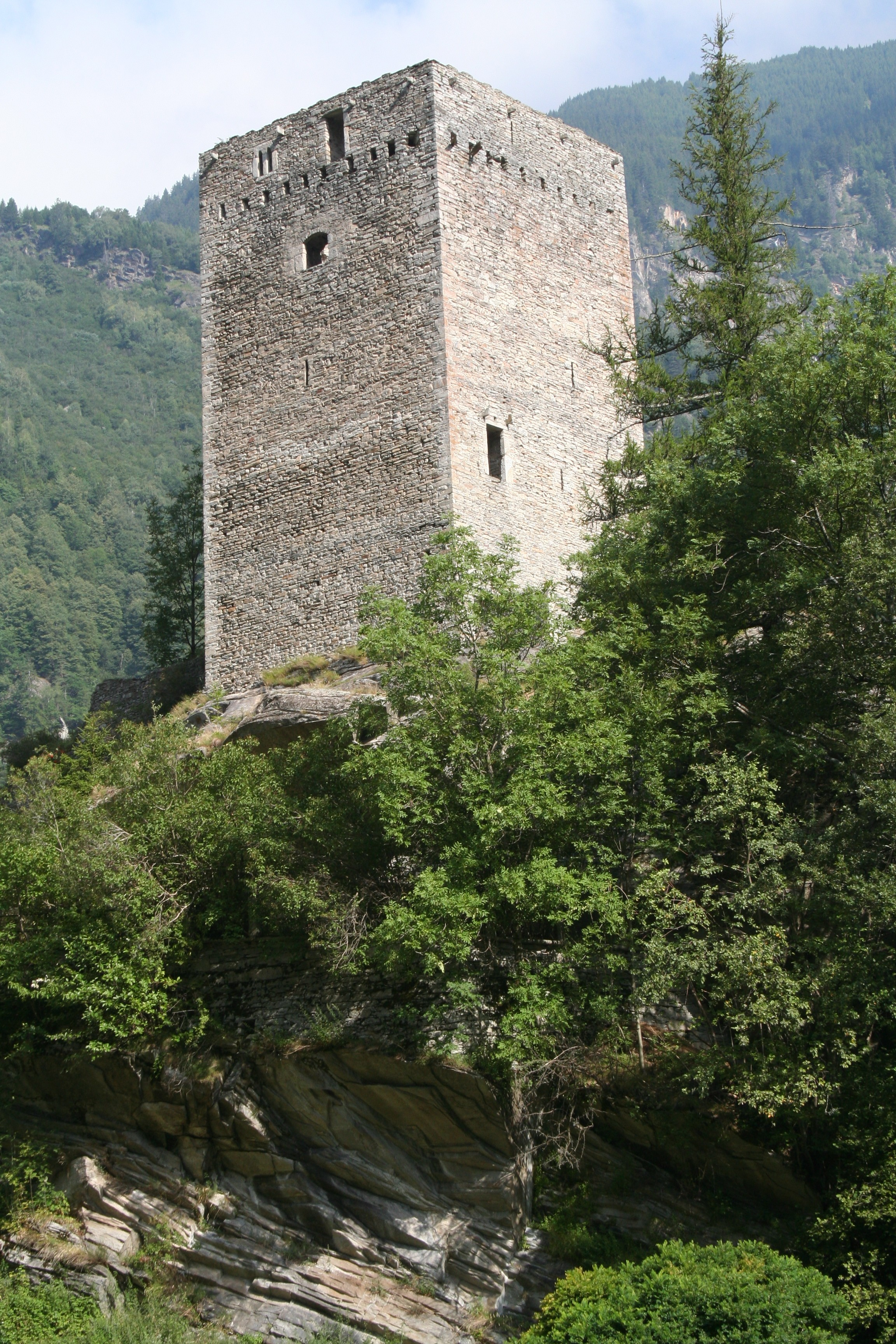
- Tower of Castelmur

Site information
- Type: hill castle
- Code: CH-GR
- Condition: ruin

Location
- Location within Canton of Graubünden Location within Switzerland
- Coordinates: 46°20′28″N 9°33′38″E
- Height: 930 m above the sea

Site history
- Built: before 842

Castelmur Castle is a castle in the village of Bondo in the municipality of Bregaglia of the Canton of Graubünden in Switzerland. It is a Swiss heritage site of national significance. The fortifications at Castelmur may be, after the Three Castles of Bellinzona, the most important example of medieval valley fortifications in modern Switzerland.

== History ==
The castle site has been occupied and fortified since at least the Roman era. The important trade road over the Septimer Pass runs through the Val Bregaglia. At Bondo the valley narrows leaving a narrow passage between the Maira river and a large rocky outcropping, making the castle site an ideal location for a customs station and fortification. The Romans built a guard station and village named "Murus" according to the 3rd century Itinerarium Antonini. The foundations of several buildings as well as one building's hypocaust and two small votive altars have been excavated from the Roman settlement.

After the fall of the Western Roman Empire the Castelmur next appears in 842 as castellum ad Bergalliam. At that time it was owned by the Emperor and held by Constantius of Sargans. It included the porta bergalliae a customs and toll station located nearby. In 960 Emperor Otto I granted the castle and right to collect tolls to the Bishop of Chur to help secure this important alpine trade route. In 988 Emperor Otto III confirmed his grandfather's grant to the Bishop and specifically mentioned both the castle and the nearby Nossa Donna Church. The current tower was probably built around 1200.

Over the following centuries the Bishop of Chur and the town of Chiavenna quarreled over Castelmur and in 1121 or 1122 the town captured the castle. However, Pope Callixtus II intervened and forced Chiavenna to return the castle to Chur. In 1190 the Bishop granted the castle to Albertus de Castello Muro or Castelmur. His descendants ruled over the castle until 1264 when Albertus Popus Castelmur stole cattle from the nobles of Chiavenna and Piuro, led to an invasion and the castle being conquered in 1268. These nobles held the Castelmur for four years before returning it to the Castelmurs in 1272. Around 1340 the Bishop reclaimed the castle and then mortgaged it to the Planta family for 200 Marks. To discourage the Planta family from trying to completely annex the lucrative castle and tolls, in 1410 the Bishop mortgaged it to Jacob Perutt von Castelmur for 150 Gulden. Twenty years later the Bishop used a loan from the Salis family to buy out the mortgage and give it to them. In 1490, for the last time, the Bishop gave the castle to Michel Pfannholz. However, he abandoned it in 1538 and left the castle to fall into ruin.

The castle ruins were repaired and cleaned in the 19th century by Baron Giovanni de Castelmur. In addition to the castle, he repaired and rededicated the nearby church of S. Maria (Nossa Donna). The church's bell tower is a Romanesque construction, but much of the church itself, including the nave are from this 19th century renovation. The church was first mentioned in 988.

== Castle site ==
The original fortification was a wall or letzi that straddled the valley between the Maira river and the castle hill. This wall, which was up to 3.7 meters (12 ft) thick, had a gate that could be blocked by logs if needed. The remains of this wall are north-west of the main tower. In the 12th century a square tower with a ring wall were built on top of the steep outcrop. This tower allowed a noble family to take up residence and changed Castelmur from a toll collecting station into a regional administrative center. The five story square tower was 12 m (39 ft) on a side with 2.4 m (7.9 ft) walls on the lowest story. Much of this tower is still visible. The castle church was built below the castle hill south of the main tower. At some point, a second tower was added on a tall hill south of the main tower. This building measured about 10 m × 10 m (33 ft × 33 ft), though very little of it still remain.

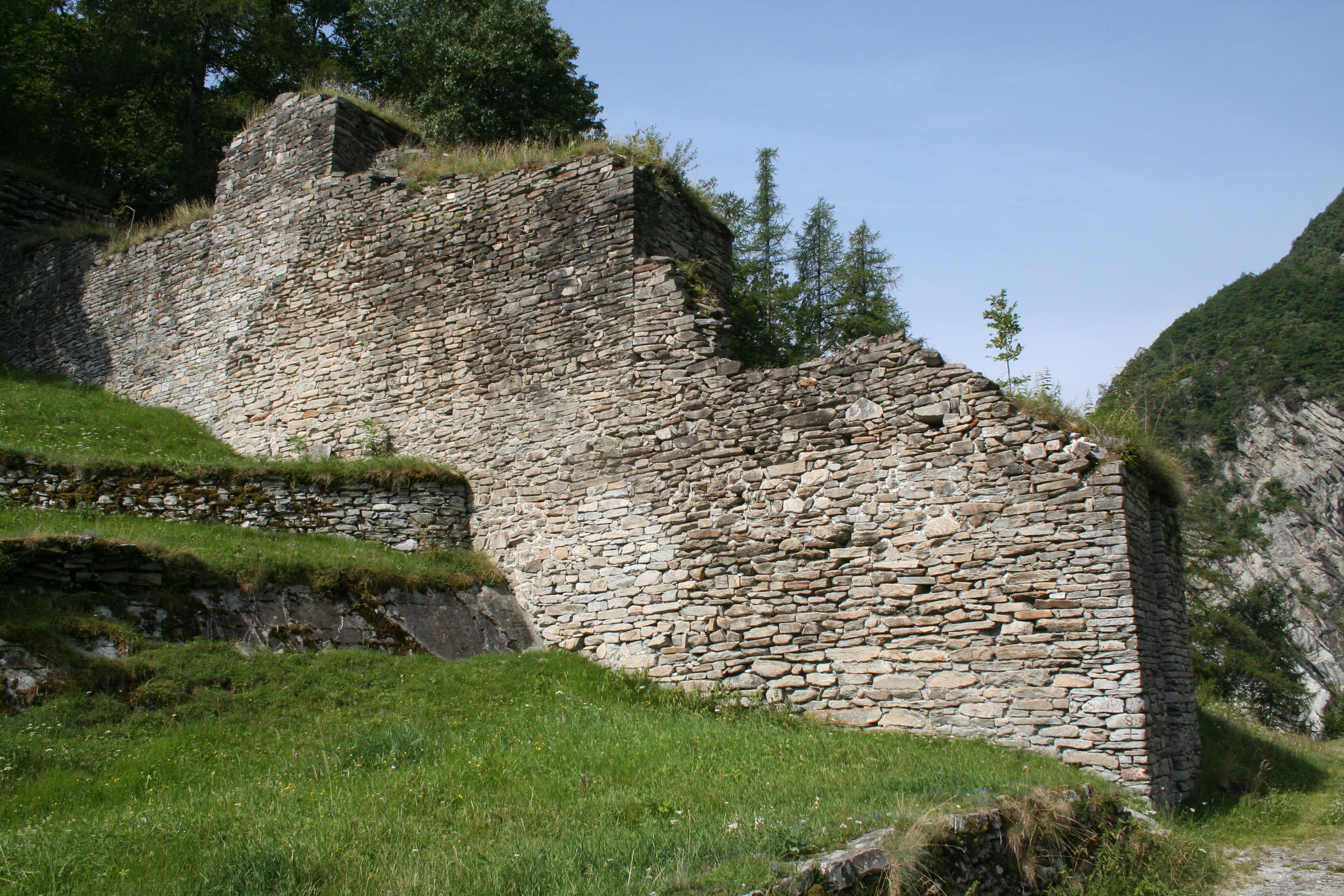
Ruins of the valley wall

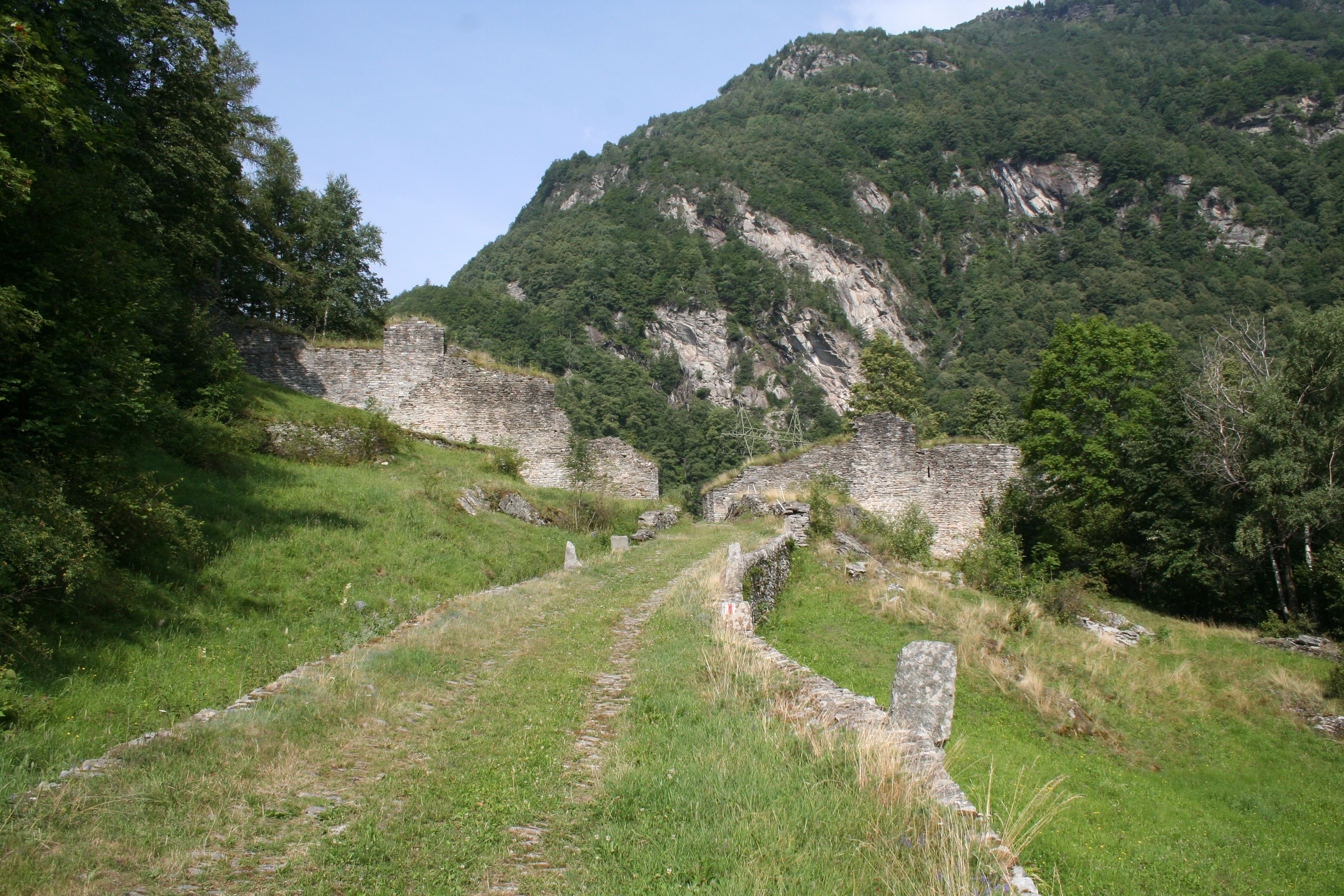
Ruins of the valley road and wall

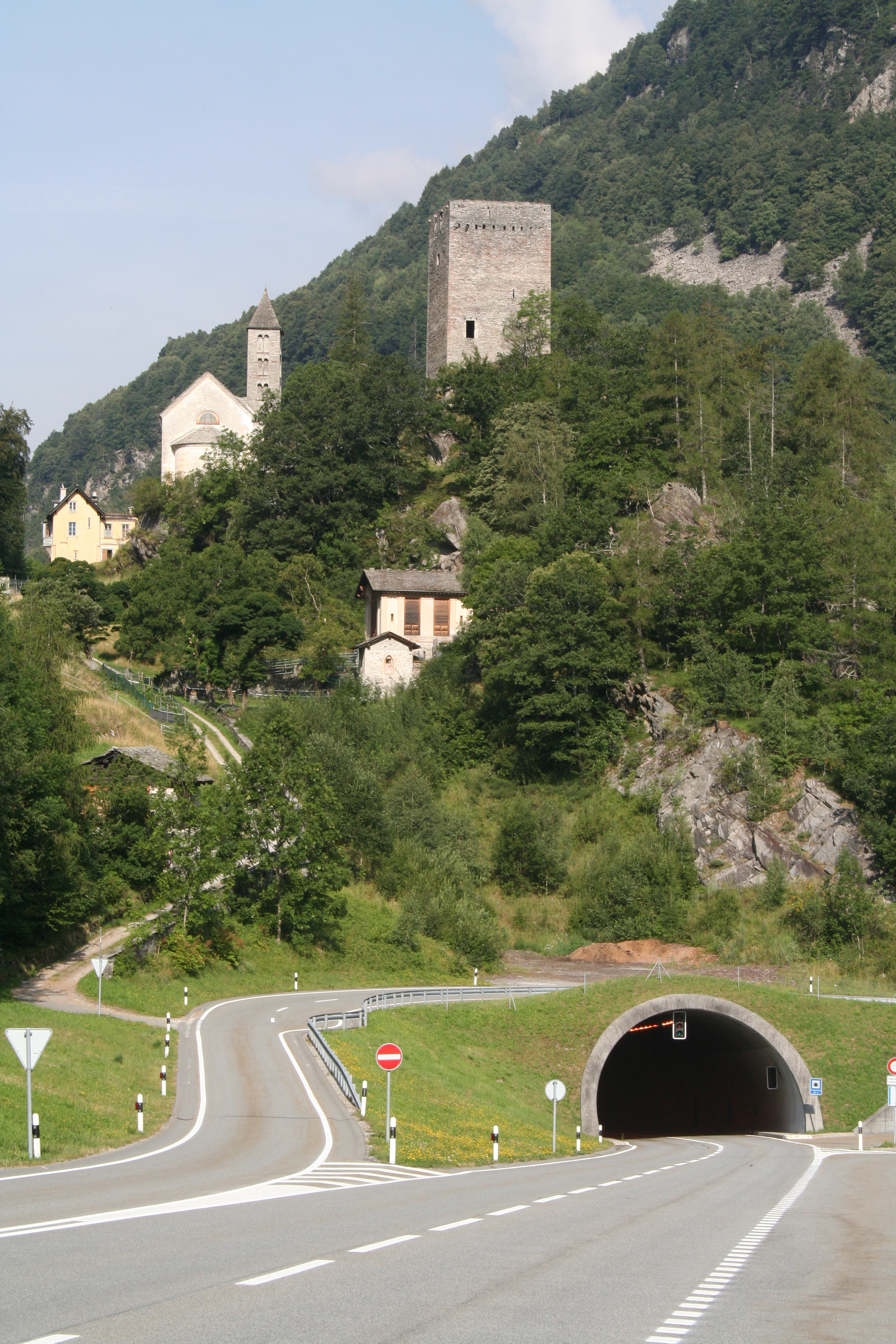
The main road through the valley passes under the Castelmur

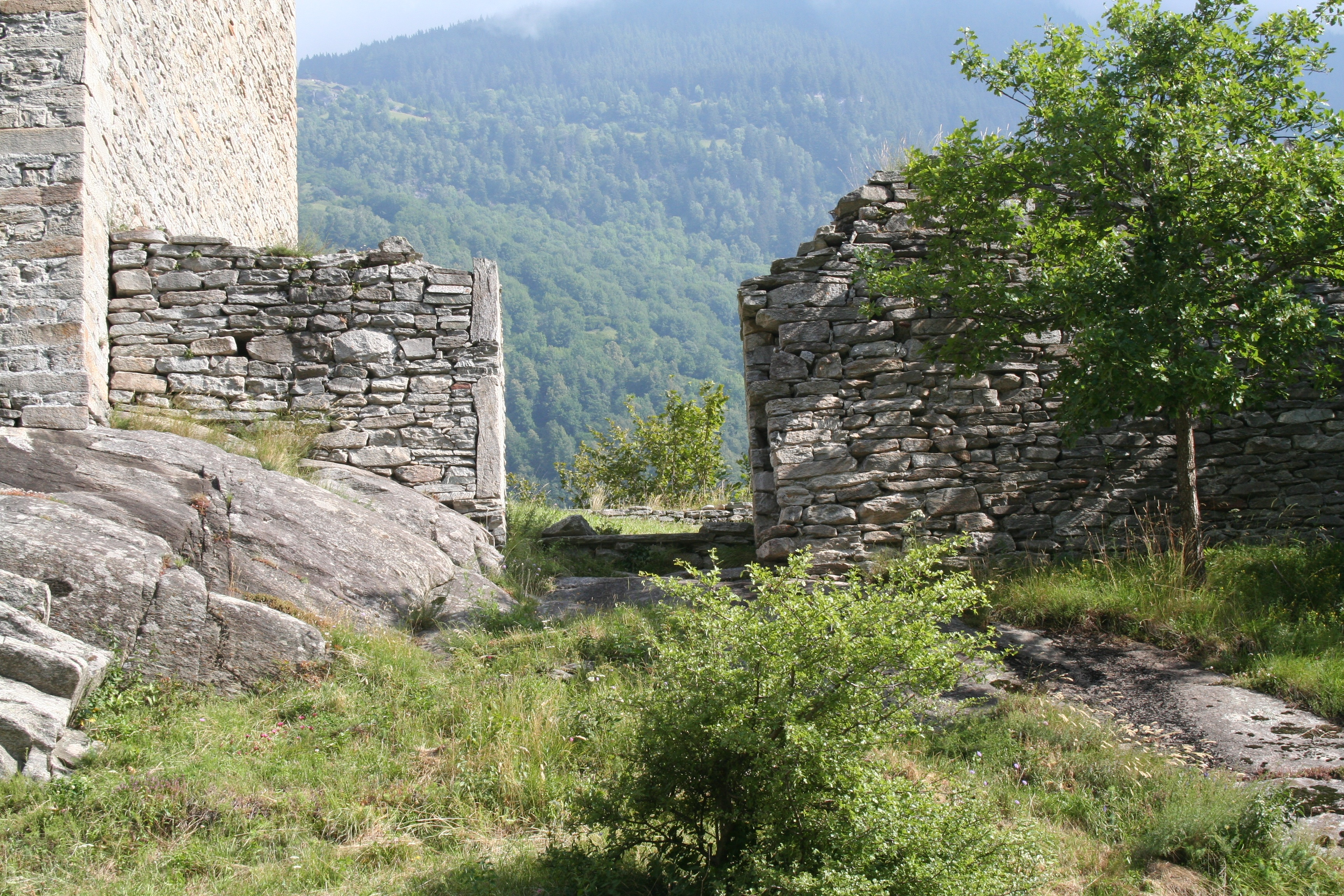
Door into the main castle complex

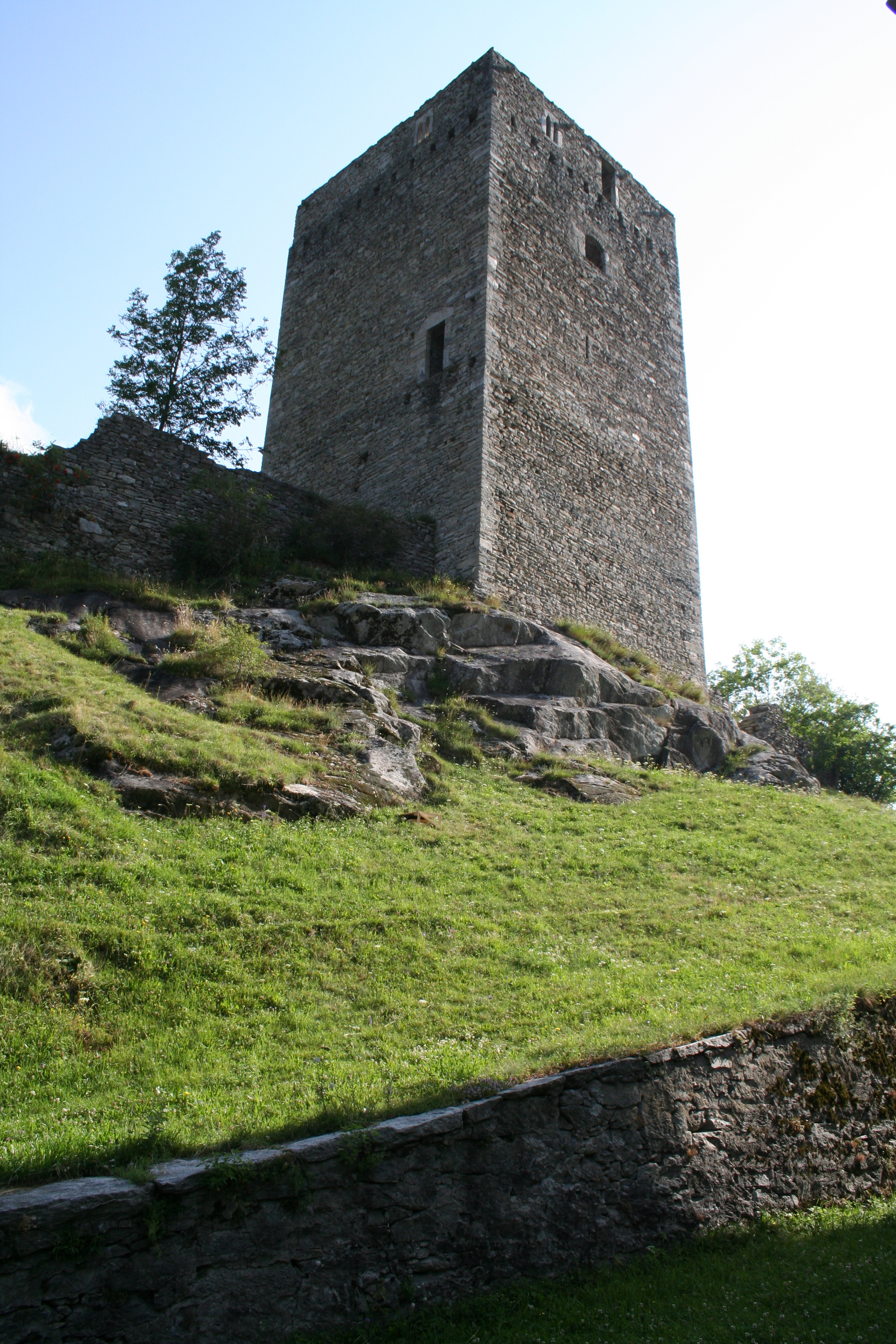
The main square tower

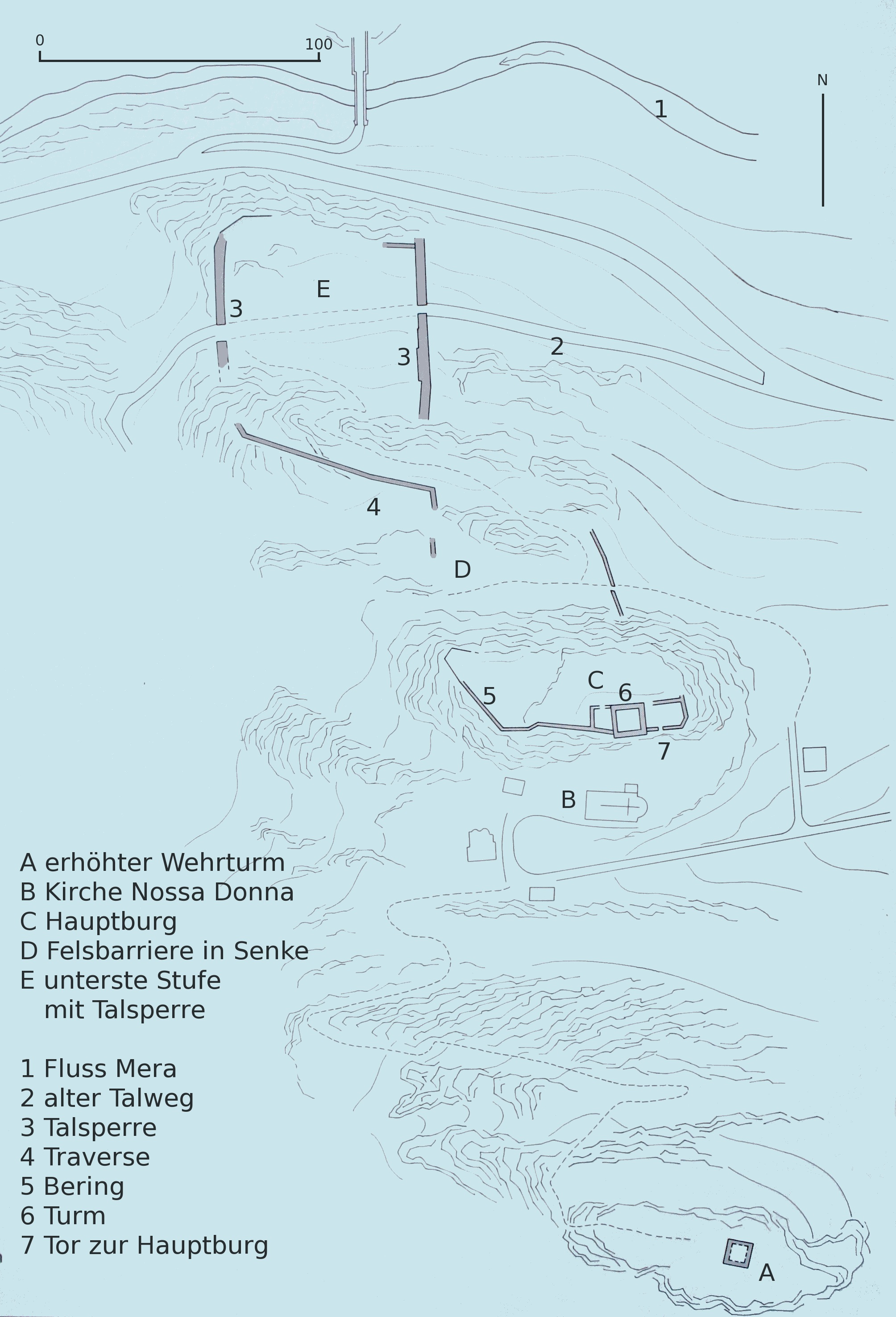
Layout of Castelmur

== See also ==
- List of castles in Switzerland
