= Promontogno =

Village in Grisons, Switzerland

Coordinates: 46°20′N 9°34′E

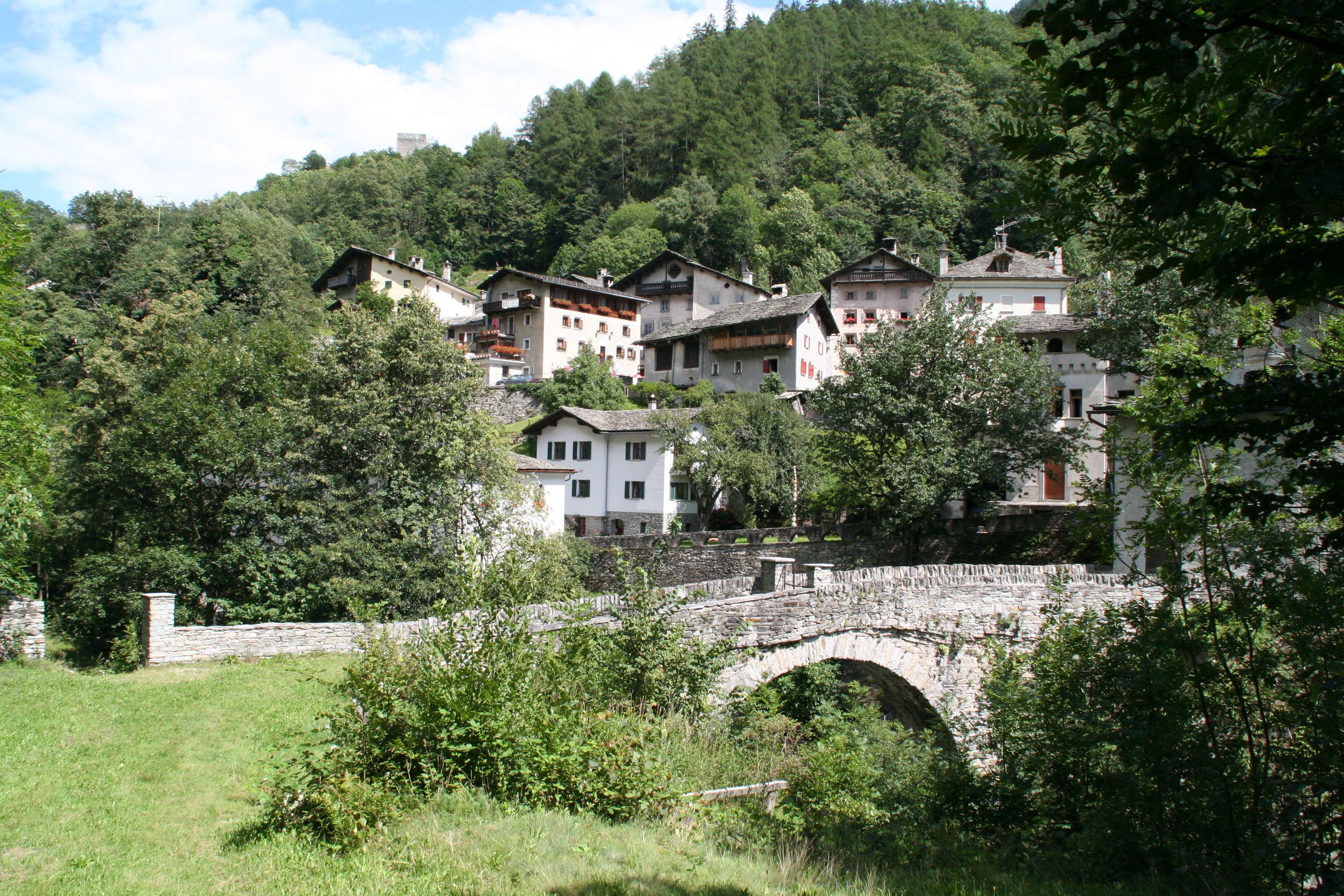
Promontogno

Promontogno is a village and a hamlet of the town of Bondo in Bergell valley. It is an Italian-speaking part of the district of Graubünden in Switzerland. Since 2010, Promontogno has been part of Bregaglia. The village was first mentioned in 1348, under the name “Primentonia”.
