= Riva family =

Noble family from Lugano

Riva
- Place of origin: Lugano, Ticino
- Founded: Early 13th century
- Founder: Ariprandus da Ripa (first known member)
- Titles: Count (1698), Marquis (1777)

The Riva family (also known as da Ripa or de Ripa) is a noble family from Lugano, attested there since the early 13th century. Between the 17th and 18th centuries, they were among the families holding the most influential positions in the local magistracy.

The surname Riva is widespread in northern Italy and Italian Switzerland, and also appears in Tesserete, Locarno (from the late 15th century), Brissago, and Bellinzone (from 1479), as well as in Roveredo (from 1555) and later north of the Alps and in South America. The origins and family connections of the various lineages are uncertain.

== History ==
=== Origins and early presence in Lugano ===
The first known member of the Lugano Riva, probably originating from Como, is Ariprandus da Ripa, mentioned in 1205 as a notary. In 1331, Jacobus Riva is recorded as podestà of the town. From Benedetto Riva (1380–1452), an apothecary, the genealogy of the Lugano branch can be reconstructed without interruption. The Riva were admitted into the community (vicinia) during the first half of the 15th century and are listed among the commoners from 1448. Between the 17th and 18th centuries, the family experienced considerable social ascent, becoming one of the most powerful in the town and the region, with prominent representatives in the political, military, cultural, and ecclesiastical spheres. The Lugano Riva were numerous and divided into several branches.

=== Economic activities ===
Following the classic path of urban ruling groups of the period, the Riva were active in several domains: trade, landholding, magistracy, and banking. Commercial interests remained central to their activities, sometimes into the 18th century, as in the case of Stefano Riva, who is consistently referred to as a "merchant" in the sources. The family was not, however, involved in emigration, the military, construction, or the arts.

=== Political role ===
The Riva were regularly represented at all three levels of administration in Lugano and its bailiwick: the town council, the community council (or Reggenza), and the Magnifico ufficio, the council gathering the officers who assisted the bailiff (capitano reggente). Entry into the exclusive circle controlling this body — which also included the Castoreo, Morosini, and Rusca families, with whom they often formed alliances — confirmed their rise to the top of the community.

=== Landholding and credit ===
From the 17th century, the family was very active on the land market, first in the Lugano area, then in the Mendrisiotto and beyond. The Riva held important rights and owned large estates in the Sottoceneri (bailiwicks of Lugano and Mendrisio), and also possessed some property in the bailiwick of Locarno and in the State of Milan, notably at Masnago, near Varese. In Lugano, they acquired or had built various buildings, among them three structures in the districts of Cioccaro, Canova, and Verla (Santa Margherita), which still bear witness to the family's former prestige and wealth, in the immediate surroundings of the town (Montarina and Castagnola), as well as in numerous villages of the Lugano area and Mendrisiotto, including Bioggio, Besazio, Genestrerio, and Rancate.

The accumulation of significant landed property also gave rise to an intense activity in credit and patronage. The density and duration of these clientelist networks contributed to reinforcing the family's political, social, and economic influence. For some communities, such as Cademario, the Riva became a reliable point of reference for loans and assistance of all kinds.

=== Religious and cultural connections ===
In the town, the Riva were also protectors of convents and held high ecclesiastical offices, as in the case of Stefano Riva. From the 18th century in particular, they maintained close ties with the Somascan college of Sant'Antonio through counts Giovanni Battista Riva and Gian Pietro Riva. The latter also distinguished himself culturally, as did Francesco Saverio Riva, benefactor and protector of several religious communities in the town. Women of the family were well represented in the convents of Lugano, often as abbesses or superiors — for example Vittoria Marianna Riva — and were also active in charitable and welfare activities, as was customary for noblewomen of the period.

=== Titles and external recognition ===
The family's horizons were not limited to the Italian bailiwicks. Giovanni Battista Riva was admitted in 1691 into the patriciate of the city of Lucerne, and in 1698 received the hereditary title of count at the court of the Farnese, dukes of Parma, Piacenza, and Castro. In 1728, his son Antonio Riva obtained citizenship of Milan. In 1777, Duke Maximilian III Joseph of Wittelsbach, Elector of Bavaria, granted the title of marquis to Giacomo Riva (1738–1825). The acquisition of these titles reflects the family's ambition to be active on multiple fronts, north and south of the Alps.

=== Marriage alliances and godparentage ===
The Riva reinforced their networks inside and outside the bailiwicks through their matrimonial and spiritual kinship policies. Marriages, based on endogamy, were concluded mainly at the local level with members of the ruling classes of Lugano and Mendrisio, but there were also unions with Lombard families — for instance, the marriage of Count Antonio Riva to Regina Francesca Giani, and that of their eldest son Giovanni Battista Riva (1704–1774) to Margherita Raimondi (1716–1767), a patrician of Como. Spiritual kinship, by contrast, also extended north of the Alps, strengthening ties with the Catholic elite of those regions, particularly in Lucerne.

=== Later period ===
During the revolutionary and counter-revolutionary upheavals of the late 18th century, the Riva generally aligned, as might be expected given their privileges and power, with the conservative, pro-Helvetic faction; there were, however, some Cisalpine patriots among them, including Francesco Riva, Rodolfo Riva, and Stefano Riva (1755–1842). In the 19th and 20th centuries, the family still counted prominent political figures, among them Antonio Riva (1870–1942), but no longer played the hegemonic role it had in the 18th century.

== Bibliography ==
- Fidecommesso Riva (ed.): Storia della famiglia Riva, 3 vols., 1972–1993 (with genealogy).
- Schnyder, Marco: "Cademario tra Sei e Settecento. Flussi di potere e governo di un territorio", in: Panzera, Fabrizio (ed.): Cademario. Dall'antichità al terzo millennio, 2008, pp. 51–71.
- Schnyder, Marco: Famiglie e potere. Il ceto dirigente di Lugano e Mendrisio tra Sei e Settecento, 2011.
- Martinoli, Simona (ed.): Il palazzo Riva di Santa Margherita a Lugano e la sua quadreria, 2014.
- Agustoni, Edoardo; Pedrini Stanga, Lucia (ed.): Dentro i palazzi. Uno sguardo sul collezionismo privato nella Lugano del Sette e Ottocento: le quadrerie Riva, 2020.
