= Rodolfo Giovanni Riva =

Ticinese politician (1679–1763)

- Born: 14 December 1679; Lugano
- Died: 12 February 1763 (aged 83); Lugano
- Title: Count
- Spouse: Maria Maddalena Rusca
- Parent: Giovanni Battista Riva
- Relatives: Antonio Riva (brother), Francesco Saverio Riva (brother), Gian Pietro Riva (brother)

Rodolfo Giovanni Riva (14 December 1679 – 12 February 1763) was a Luganesi nobleman and official who served for decades in civic and military capacities in the bailiwick of Mendrisio and the town of Lugano. He held the title of count and was a burgher of Bioggio from 1723.

== Family ==
Riva was born in Lugano on 14 December 1679, the son of Giovanni Battista Riva. He was the brother of Antonio Riva, Francesco Saverio Riva, and Gian Pietro Riva. In 1708 he married Maria Maddalena Rusca, daughter of Pietro Antonio Rusca.

== Education and career ==
Riva was educated at the Jesuit college in Lucerne, then pursued humanities and legal studies in Parma and Rome, obtaining a degree in both canon and civil law (licentia in utroque iure).

Over a long career in Lugano, Riva served as a member of the town council (1702–1757) and as its president. He also held the positions of lieutenant bailiff (luogotenente del balivo), captain general of the militia, and fiscal officer (from 1731). Active in the property sector, he was additionally entrusted with the collection of customs duties in the bailiwick of Mendrisio.

== Bibliography ==
- Storia della famiglia Riva, vol. 2, 1971, pp. 79–88.
- M. Schnyder, Tra nord e sud delle Alpi, thesis, University of Florence, 2008.
