= Giovanni Battista Riva (landowner) =

Swiss landowner and official (1695–1777)

- Born: 16 September 1695; Lugano
- Died: 20 April 1777 (aged 81); Lugano
- Occupations: Landowner, quarry operator, member and president of the Council of the borough of Lugano

Giovanni Battista Riva (16 September 1695 – 20 April 1777) was a Luganese landowner, quarry and sandpit operator, and local official. He served as a member and president of the Council of the borough of Lugano, and as regent of the community.

== Biography ==
=== Origins and early life ===
Giovanni Battista Riva was born on 16 September 1695 in Lugano. He was the son of Stefano Riva, a landowner, and of Clelia Rusca. In 1727, he married Marianna Castoreo, daughter of Giacomo Francesco Castoreo of Lugano. He studied at the Collegio Sant'Antonio in Lugano and subsequently at the University of Siena (1716).

=== Career ===
In Lugano, Riva served as chaplain of the Confraternity of the Most Holy Annunciation (1724). He was a member and later president (1750) of the Council of the borough, as well as regent of the community. He also operated quarries and sandpits (1749). In 1746–1747, he had the family palace of Canova built.

== See also ==
- Riva family

== Bibliography ==
- Storia della famiglia Riva, vol. 1, 1971, pp. 268–272.
- Schnyder, Marco: Tra nord e sud delle Alpi, thesis, Florence, 2008.
