= Furna railway station =

Railway station in Switzerland

Furna
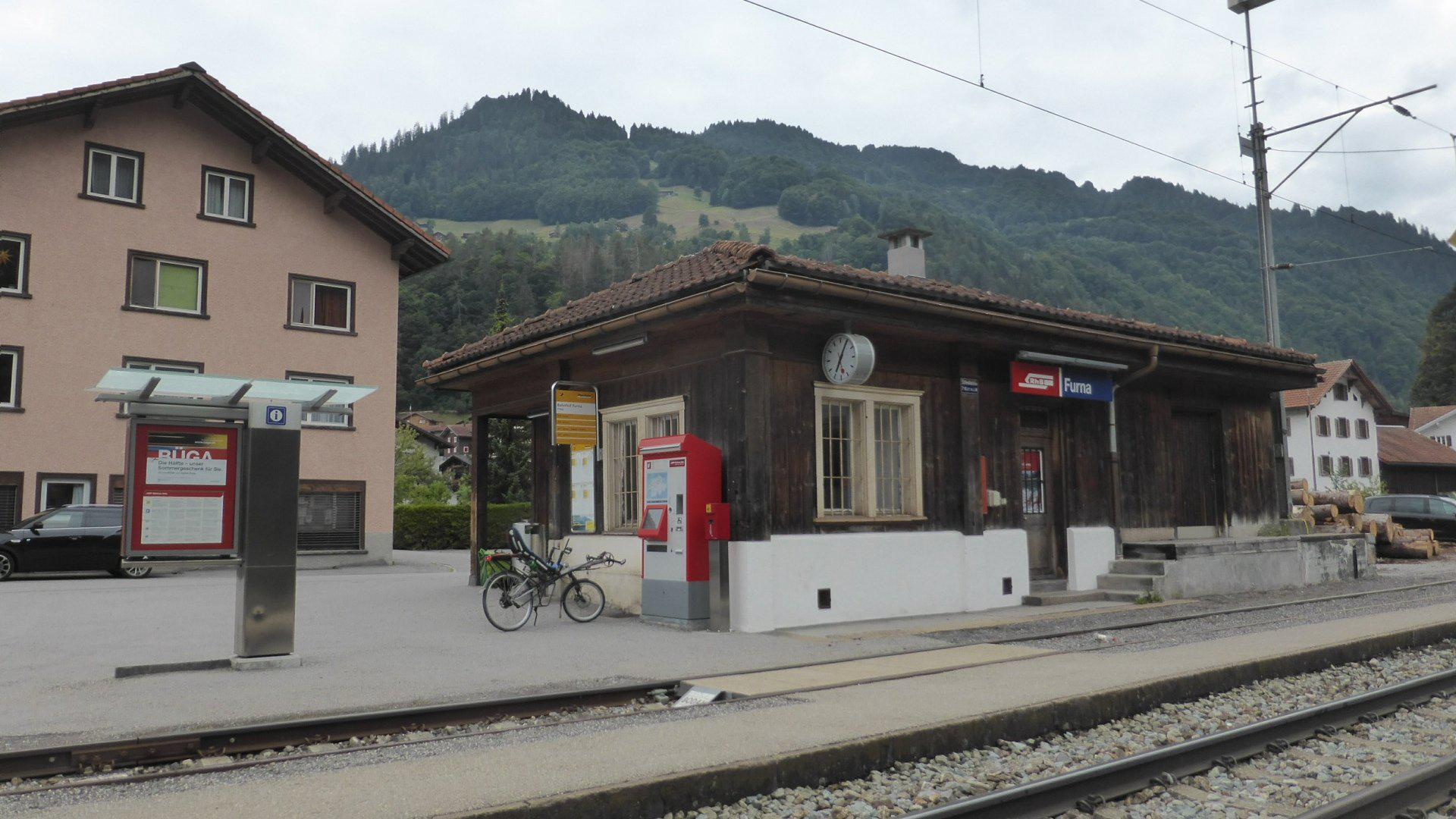
- The station in 2018

General information
- Location: Jenaz; Switzerland
- Coordinates: 46°56′23″N 9°42′32″E
- Elevation: 715 m (2,346 ft)
- Owner: Rhaetian Railway
- Line: Landquart–Davos Platz line
- Distance: 15.4 km (9.6 mi) from Landquart
- Train operators: Rhaetian Railway
- Connections: PostAuto Schweiz buses

Passengers
- 2018: 50 per weekday

Services
Preceding station	Rhaetian Railway	Following station
Schiers towards Landquart	RE 24	Jenaz towards Davos Platz or Scuol-Tarasp
Location

Furna railway station (German: Bahnhof Furna) is a railway station in the municipality of Jenaz, in the Swiss canton of Grisons. It takes its name from the nearby municipality of Furna. It is an intermediate stop on the Rhaetian Railway 1,000 mm (3 ft 3 3/8 in) metre gauge Landquart–Davos Platz line.

== Services ==
As of the December 2023 timetable change, the following services stop at Furna:

- RegioExpress: rush-hour service to Landquart, Davos Platz, and Scuol-Tarasp.
