= Fidelis of Sigmaringen =

Capuchin friar and saint (1577–1622)

Saint Fidelis of Sigmaringen OFM Cap
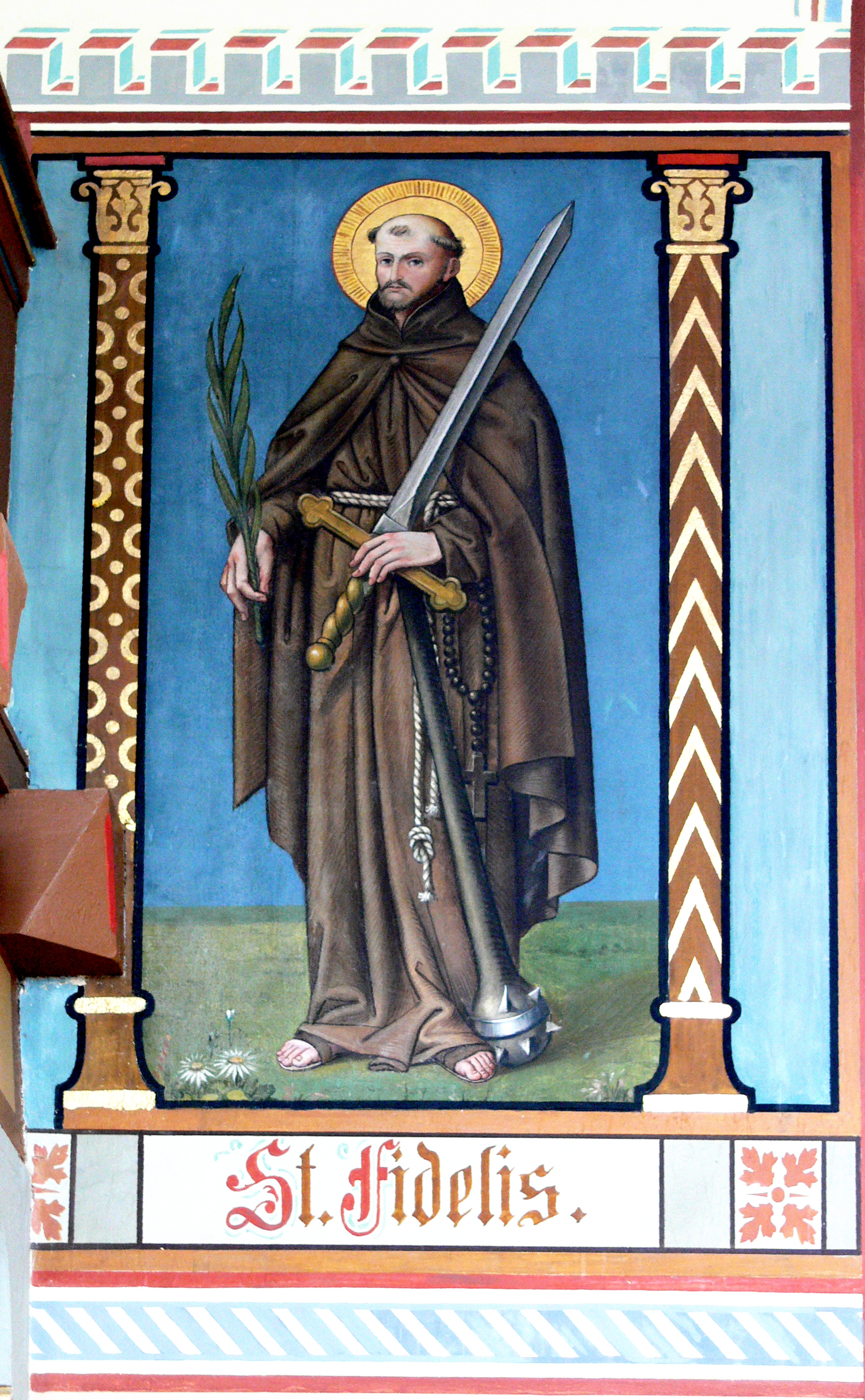

Martyr
- Born: 1577; Sigmaringen, Principality of Hohenzollern-Sigmaringen
- Died: 24 April 1622 (aged 44–45); Grüsch, Seewis im Prättigau, Free State of the Three Leagues
- Venerated in: Catholic Church
- Beatified: 24 March 1729 by Pope Benedict XIII
- Canonized: 29 June 1746, Rome by Pope Benedict XIV
- Major shrine: Capuchin friary of Weltkirchen (Feldkirch), Austria
- Feast: 24 April
- Attributes: sword; palm of martyrdom; heretics; morning star; trampling on the word "heresy"; with a club set with spikes; with a whirlbat; with an angel carrying a palm of martyrdom; with Saint Joseph of Leonessa

Fidelis of Sigmaringen, O.F.M. Cap. (born Mark Roy or Rey; 1577 – 24 April 1622) was a German Capuchin friar who was involved in the Catholic Counter-Reformation. He was martyred by his opponents at Seewis im Prättigau, now part of Switzerland. Fidelis was canonized in 1746.

== Early life ==
He was born Mark Roy or Rey in 1577, in Sigmaringen, a town in modern-day Germany, then under the Principality of Hohenzollern-Sigmaringen. His father, Johannes Rey, of Flemish ancestry, was the burgomaster of the town.

Rey studied law and philosophy at the University of Freiburg. He subsequently taught philosophy at this university, ultimately earning the degree of Doctor of Law. During his time as a student, he did not drink wine and wore a hair-shirt. He was known for his modesty, meekness and chastity.

In 1604, Rey accompanied, as preceptor (teacher-mentor), three young Swabian gentlemen on their travels through the principal parts of Europe. During six years of travel, he attended Mass very frequently. In every town they came to, he visited the hospitals and churches, passed several hours on his knees in the presence of the Blessed Sacrament, and was generous to the poor, sometimes giving them the very clothes off his back.

Upon his return, he practiced law as a counselor or advocate, at Colmar in Alsace, France, where he came to be known as the 'poor man's lawyer'. He scrupulously forbore all invectives, detractions, and whatever might affect the reputation of any adversary. Disenchanted with the evils associated with his profession, he determined to join his brother George as a member of the Capuchin friars.

== Life as a friar ==
Upon entering the Capuchin order, the guardian gave him the religious name Fidelis, the Latin word for "faithful", alluding to that text from the Book of Revelation which promises a crown of life to him who shall continue faithful to the end. He finished his novitiate and studied for the priesthood. Eventually, he was ordained, saying his first Mass at the Capuchin friary in Freiburg on 4 October 1612 (the feast day of St. Francis of Assisi, founder of the order).

As soon as Fidelis finished his course of theology, he was immediately employed in preaching and in hearing confessions. He became guardian of the Capuchin friary in Weltkirchen, Feldkirch, (in present-day Austria). During a severe epidemic in a city, Fidelis cared for and cured many sick soldiers. Many residents of the town and neighboring places were reformed by his zealous labors, and several Calvinists were converted. The Congregation of the Doctrine of the Faith commissioned Fidelis to preach in the Graubünden, now a canton of eastern Switzerland. Eight other Capuchin friars were to be his assistants, and they labored in this mission under his direction.

The Calvinists of that territory, being incensed at his success in converting their brethren, loudly threatened Fidelis' life, and he prepared himself for martyrdom. Ralph de Salis and another Calvinist gentleman were both converted by his missionary efforts. Fidelis and his companions entered into Prättigau, a small district of Graubünden, in 1622, on the Feast of the Epiphany, January 6. The effects of his ardent zeal, about which the Bishop of Coire sent a lengthy and full account to the Congregation for the Propagation of the Faith, enraged the Calvinists in that province.

On 24 April 1622, Fidelis made his confession, celebrated Mass and then preached at Grüsch. At the end of his sermon, which he had delivered with more than ordinary zeal, he stood silent all of a sudden, with his eyes fixed upon Heaven, in ecstasy. He foretold his death to several persons in the clearest terms, and began signing his letters, P. Fidelis, prope diem esca vermium ("Father Fidelis, in days ahead to become food for worms"). After the service at Grüsch he and several companions traveled to Seewis. His companions noted that he was particularly cheerful.

== Death ==
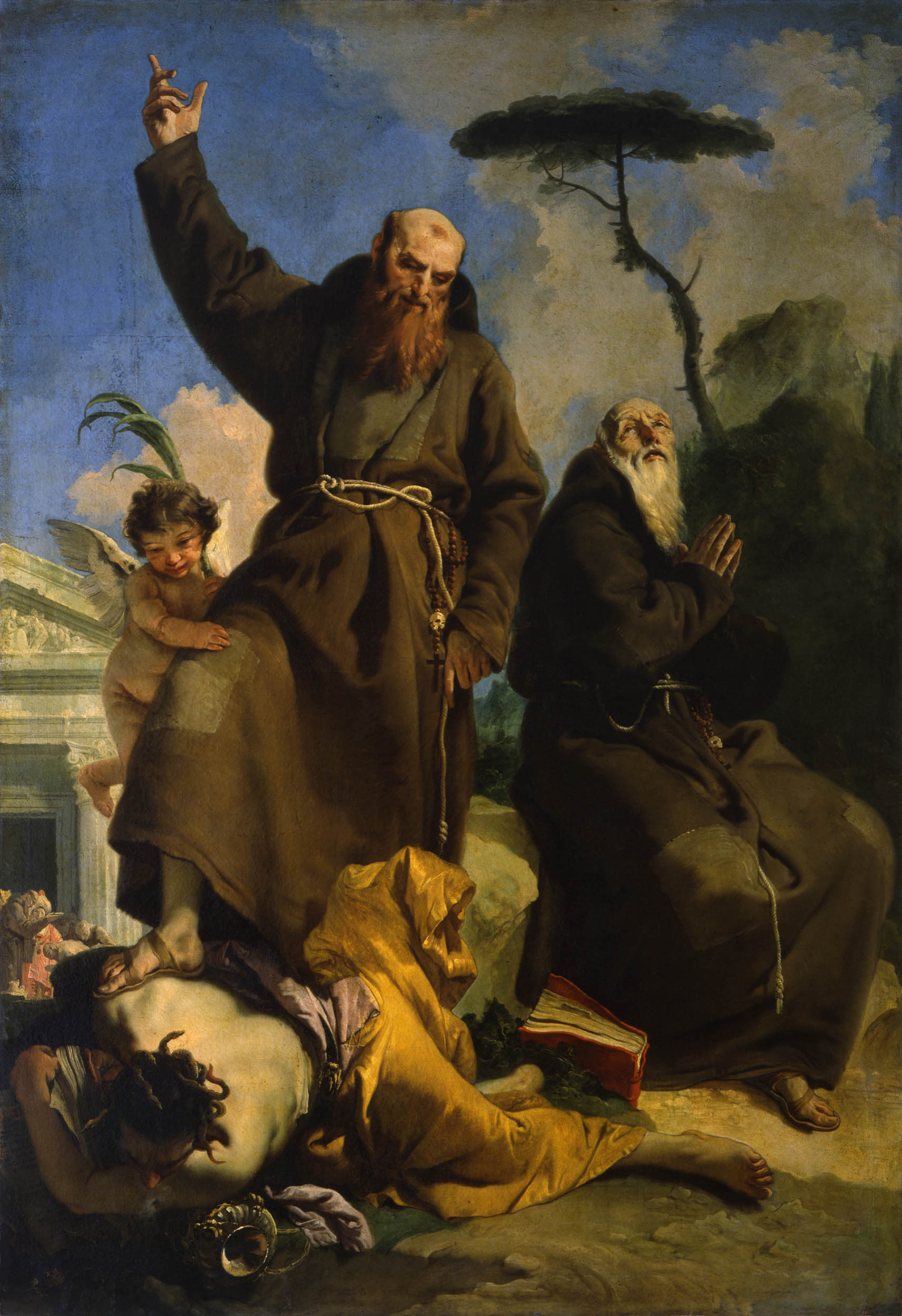
St. Fidelis of Sigmaringen with St. Joseph of Leonessa (Tiepolo, 1752–1758).

On 24 April, in a campaign organized by the Habsburgs, Fidelis was preaching under protection of some Austrian imperial soldiers in the Church at Seewis with the aim of reconverting the people of Seewis to Catholicism. During the sermon, his listeners were called "to arms" by the Calvinist agitators outside. Some of the people went to face the Austrian troops outside the church. Fidelis had been persuaded by the remaining Catholics to immediately flee with the Austrian troops out of Seewis, which he did, but then returned alone to Grüsch. On his way back he was confronted by 20 Calvinist soldiers who demanded unsuccessfully that he renounce the Catholic faith, and when he refused, they subsequently murdered him.

A local account:

From Grüsch he went to preach at Seewis, where, with great energy, he exhorted the Catholics to constancy in the faith. After a Calvinist had discharged his musket at him in the Church, the Catholics entreated him to leave the place. He answered that death was his gain and his joy, and that he was ready to lay down his life in God's cause. On his road back to Grüsch, he met twenty Calvinist soldiers with a minister at their head. They called him a false prophet, and urged him to embrace their sect. He answered: "I am sent to you to confute, not to embrace your heresy. The Catholic religion is the faith of all ages, I fear not death." One of them beat him down to the ground by a stroke on the head with his backsword. Fidelis rose again on his knees, and stretching forth his arms in the form of a cross, said with a feeble voice "Pardon my enemies, O Lord: blinded by passion they know not what they do. Lord Jesus, have mercy on me. Mary, Mother of God, succor me!." Another sword stroke clove his skull, and he fell to the ground and lay in a pool of his own blood. The soldiers, not content with this, added many stab wounds to his body with their long knives, and hacked-off his left leg, as they said, to punish him for his many journeys into those parts to preach to them.

== Veneration ==
It is said that a Catholic woman lay concealed near the place of Fidelis' martyrdom as the saint was slain. After the soldiers had left, she came out to assess the incident and found the martyr's eyes open, fixed on the heavens. He was buried by Catholics the next day.

The rebels were soon after defeated by the imperial troops, an event which the martyr had foretold. The Protestant minister who had participated in Fidelis' martyrdom was converted by this circumstance, made a public abjuration of Calvinism and was received into the Catholic Church.

After six months, the martyr's body was found to be incorrupt, but his head and left arm were separated from his body. The body parts were then placed into two reliquaries, one sent to the Coire Cathedral, at the behest of the bishop, and laid under the High Altar; the other was placed in the Capuchin church at Weltkirchen, Feldkirch, Austria.

Saint Fidelis' feast day in the Catholic Church is celebrated on 24 April.

== See also ==
- Saint Fidelis of Sigmaringen, patron saint archive

== Sources ==
- Acts of the canonization of SS. Fidelis of Sigmarengen, Camillus de Lellis, Peter Regalati, Joseph of Leonissa and Catherine Ricci, by Pope Benedict XIV., printed in 1749, folio. On St. Fidelis, pp. 101, 179, and the bull for his canonization, p 516.
