= Jenaz railway station =

Railway station in Switzerland

Jenaz
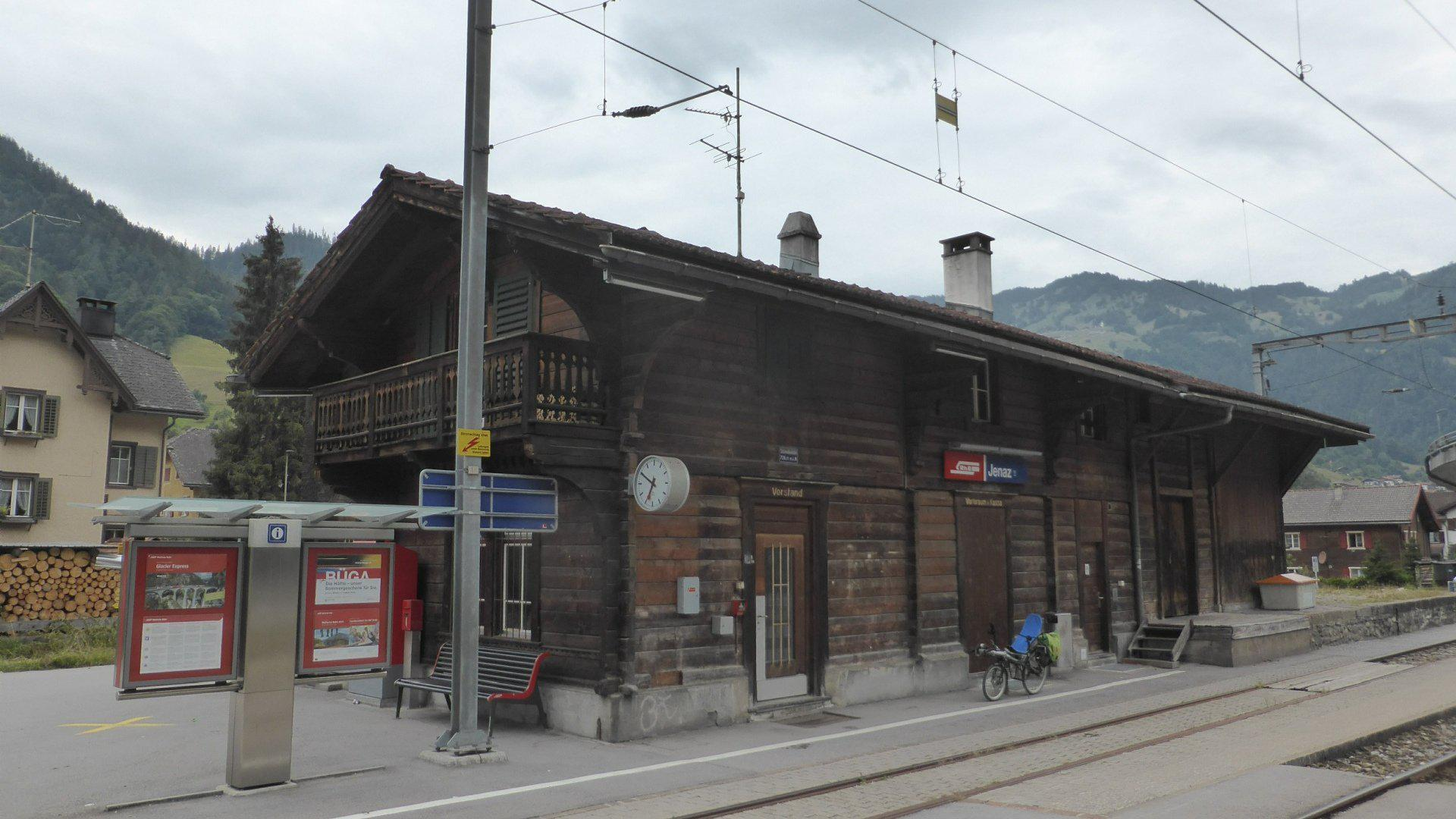
- The station building in 2018

General information
- Location: Jenaz; Switzerland
- Coordinates: 46°55′47″N 9°43′06″E
- Elevation: 723 m (2,372 ft)
- Owner: Rhaetian Railway
- Line: Landquart–Davos Platz line
- Distance: 16.8 km (10.4 mi) from Landquart
- Train operators: Rhaetian Railway

History
- Opened: 9 October 1889
- Electrified: 7 November 1921

Passengers
- 2018: 190 per weekday

Services
Preceding station	Rhaetian Railway	Following station
Furna towards Landquart	RE 24	Fideris towards Davos Platz or Scuol-Tarasp
Location

Jenaz railway station (German: Bahnhof Jenaz) is a railway station in the municipality of Jenaz, in the Swiss canton of Grisons. It is an intermediate stop on the Rhaetian Railway 1,000 mm (3 ft 3 3/8 in) metre gauge Landquart–Davos Platz lines.

== Services ==
As of the December 2023 timetable change, the following services stop at Jenaz:

- RegioExpress: hourly service between Landquart and Davos Platz or Scuol-Tarasp.
