= Fanas =

- Former municipality
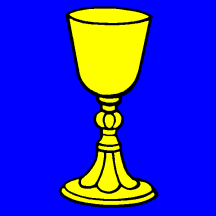
- Flag Coat of arms
- Location of Fanas
- Location within Switzerland Location within Canton of Graubünden
- Coordinates: 46°59′N 9°39′E
- Country: Switzerland
- Canton: Graubünden
- District: Prättigau/Davos

Government
  - Mayor: Hans Ulrich Gansner

Area
  - Total: 21.84 km^{2} (8.43 sq mi)
- Elevation: 907 m (2,976 ft)

Population (31 December 2010)
  - Total: 401
  - Density: 18.4/km^{2} (47.6/sq mi)
- Time zone: UTC+01:00 (CET)
  - Summer (DST): UTC+02:00 (CEST)
- Postal code: 7215
- SFOS number: 3971
- ISO 3166 code: CH-GR
- Surrounded by: Grüsch, Schiers, Seewis im Prättigau
- Website: www.fanas.ch

Fanas is a Swiss village in the Prättigau and a former municipality in the political district of Prättigau/Davos in the canton of Graubünden. On 1 January 2011 Fanas and Valzeina were merged with the municipality of Grüsch.

== History ==
Aerial view from 400 m by Walter Mittelholzer (1923)

Fanas is first mentioned in second half of the 12th Century as Phanaunes.

== Geography ==
Fanas has an area, as of 2006, of 21.8 km^{2} (8.4 sq mi). Of this area, 45% is used for agricultural purposes, while 36.8% is forested. Of the rest of the land, 0.7% is settled (buildings or roads) and the remainder (17.5%) is non-productive (rivers, glaciers or mountains).

The municipality is located in the Seewis sub-district of the Prättigau/Davos district on a terrace between Grüsch and Schiers. It consists of the linear village of Fanas.

== Demographics ==
Fanas has a population (as of 31 December 2010) of 401. As of 2008, 3.1% of the population was made up of foreign nationals. Over the last 10 years the population has grown at a rate of 3.7%.

As of 2000, the gender distribution of the population was 47.3% male and 52.7% female. The age distribution, as of 2000, in Fanas is; 47 children or 12.5% of the population are between 0 and 9 years old and 42 teenagers or 11.1% are between 10 and 19. Of the adult population, 39 people or 10.3% of the population are between 20 and 29 years old. 48 people or 12.7% are between 30 and 39, 62 people or 16.4% are between 40 and 49, and 55 people or 14.6% are between 50 and 59. The senior population distribution is 38 people or 10.1% of the population are between 60 and 69 years old, 32 people or 8.5% are between 70 and 79, there are 13 people or 3.4% who are between 80 and 89 there is 1 person who is between 90 and 99.

In the 2007 federal election the most popular party was the SVP which received 42.9% of the vote. The next three most popular parties were the FDP (26.4%), the SP (19.9%) and the CVP (6.2%).

The entire Swiss population is generally well educated. In Fanas about 75.6% of the population (between age 25-64) have completed either non-mandatory upper secondary education or additional higher education (either University or a Fachhochschule).

Fanas has an unemployment rate of 0.94%. As of 2005, there were 34 people employed in the primary economic sector and about 12 businesses involved in this sector. 26 people are employed in the secondary sector and there are 7 businesses in this sector. 28 people are employed in the tertiary sector, with 13 businesses in this sector.

The historical population is given in the following table:

| year | population |
|---|---|
| 1850 | 373 |
| 1900 | 282 |
| 1920 | 250 |
| 1950 | 303 |
| 1970 | 226 |
| 2000 | 377 |

== Languages ==
Most of the population (as of 2000) speaks German (98.1%), with French being second most common ( 0.8%) and Swedish being third ( 0.5%). Originally the village spoke Romansh, but by the mid 16th Century the majority spoke German.

Languages in Fanas
| Languages | Census 1980 | | Census 1990 | | Census 2000 | |
| Languages | Number | Percent | Number | Percent | Number | Percent |
|---|---|---|---|---|---|---|
| German | 271 | 97.48% | 333 | 96.24% | 370 | 98.14% |
| Romansh | 2 | 0.72% | 0 | 0.00% | 1 | 0.27% |
| Population | 278 | 100% | 346 | 100% | 377 | 100% |
