= Valzeina =

- Former municipality
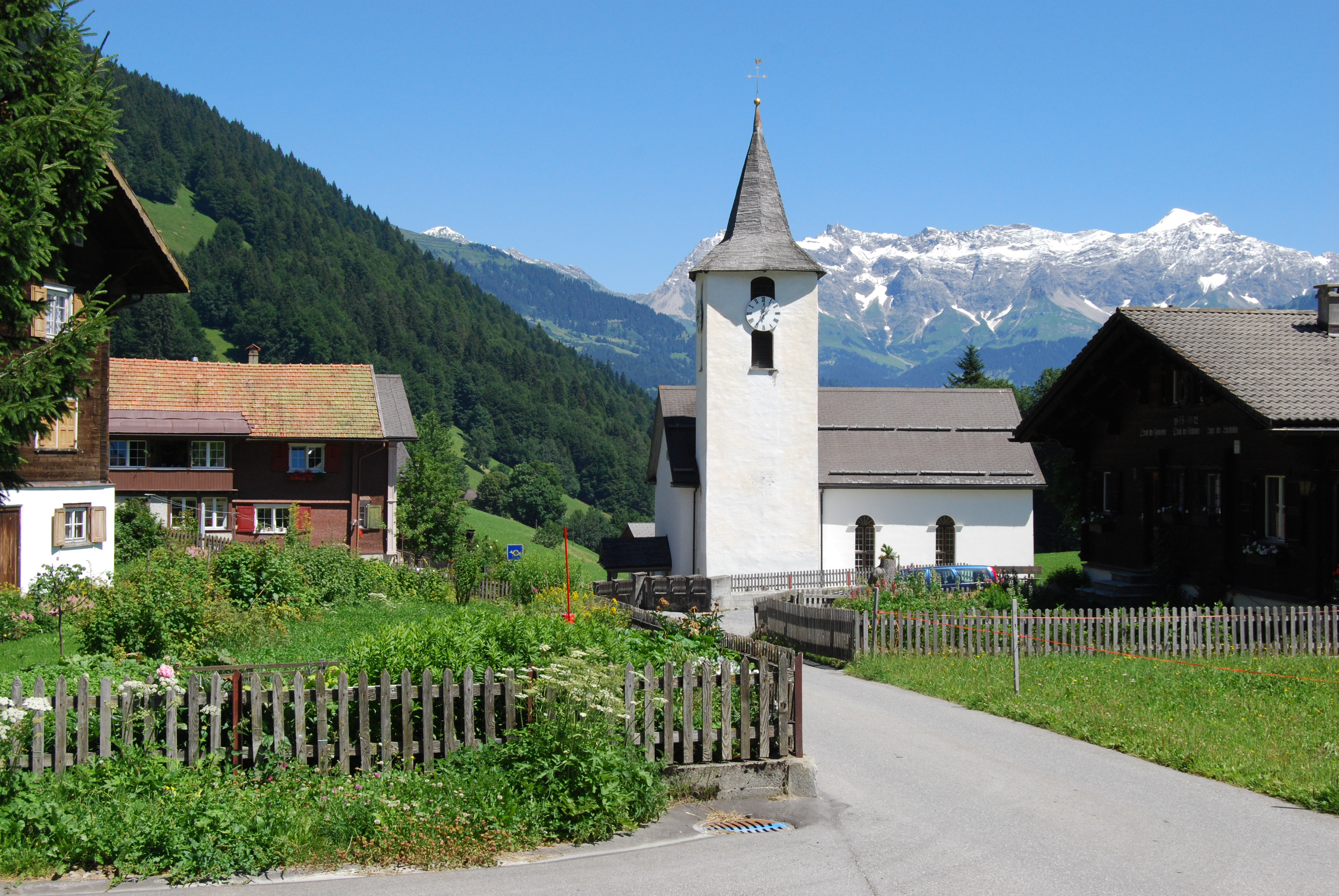
- Valzeina village and church

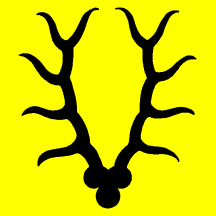
- Flag Coat of arms
- Location of Valzeina
- Location within Switzerland Location within Canton of Graubünden
- Coordinates: 46°57′N 9°36′E
- Country: Switzerland
- Canton: Graubünden
- District: Prättigau/Davos

Government
  - Mayor: Hans Wieland

Area
  - Total: 11.44 km^{2} (4.42 sq mi)
- Elevation: 1,114 m (3,655 ft)

Population (31 December 2010)
  - Total: 139
  - Density: 12.2/km^{2} (31.5/sq mi)
- Time zone: UTC+01:00 (CET)
  - Summer (DST): UTC+02:00 (CEST)
- Postal code: 7213
- SFOS number: 3973
- ISO 3166 code: CH-GR
- Surrounded by: Furna, Grüsch, Igis, Malans, Says, Seewis im Prättigau, Trimmis, Zizers
- Website: www.valzeina.ch

Valzeina is a Swiss village in the Prättigau and a former municipality in the political district of Prättigau/Davos in the canton of Graubünden. On 1 January 2011 Fanas and Valzeina were merged with the municipality of Grüsch.

== History ==
Valzeina is first mentioned in 1367 as Valtzennas.

== Geography ==
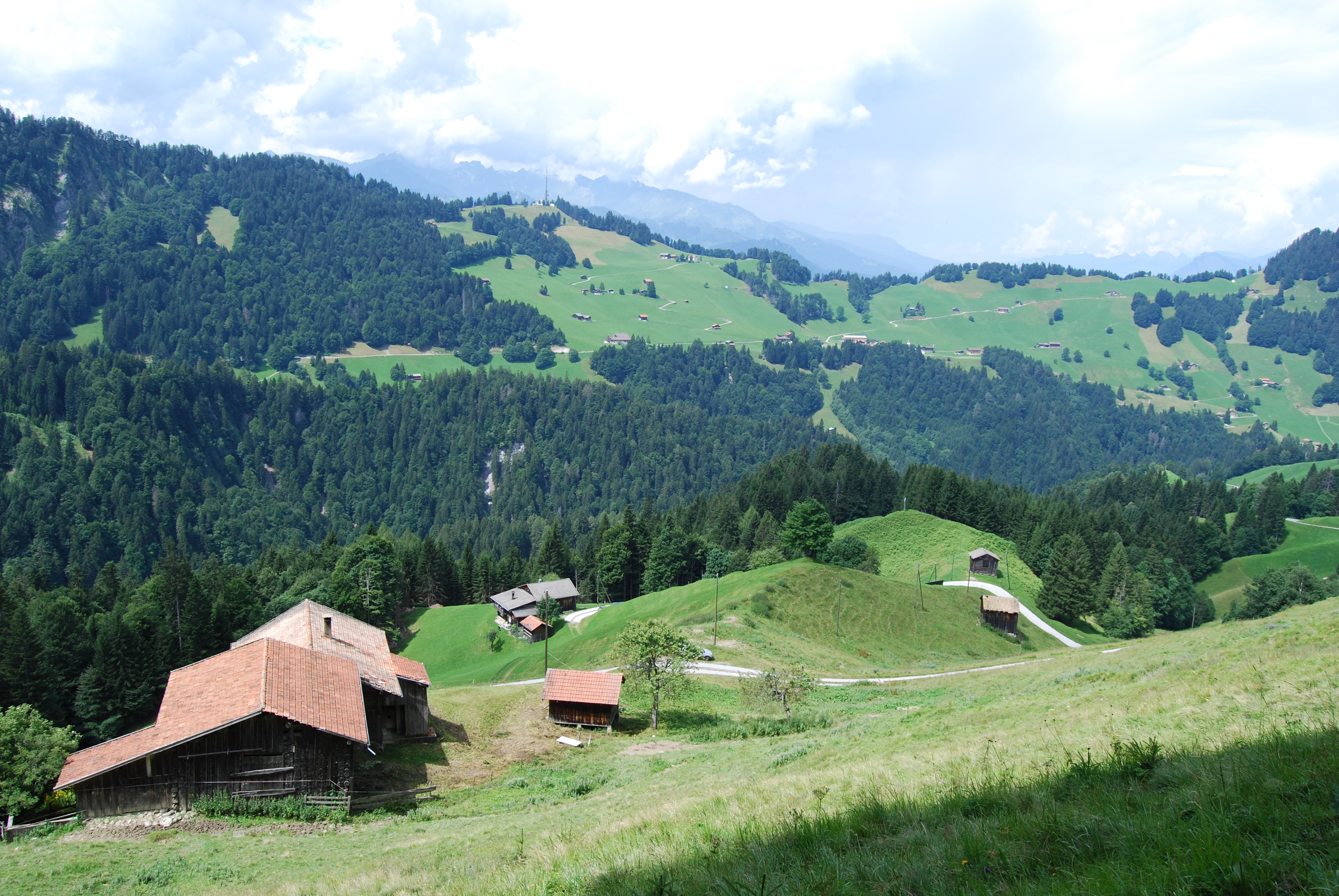
From Brand (Sigg), looking toward Valzeina

Valzeina has an area, as of 2006, of 11.4 km^{2} (4.4 sq mi). Of this area, 40.3% is used for agricultural purposes, while 53.2% is forested. Of the rest of the land, 2.5% is settled (buildings or roads) and the remainder (3.9%) is non-productive (rivers, glaciers or mountains).

The municipality is located in the Seewis sub-district of the Prättigau/Davos district. It consists of scattered settlements in Vorder-Valzeina, Hinter-Valzeina and Sigg (on the right side of the valley). The municipalities of Grüsch and Valzeina are considering a merger on 1 January 2010 into a new municipality that will be known as Grüsch.

== Demographics ==
Valzeina has a population (as of 31 December 2010) of 139. As of 2008, 3.9% of the population was made up of foreign nationals. Over the last 10 years the population has decreased at a rate of -10.1%. Most of the population (as of 2000) speaks German (97.1%), with Romansh being second most common ( 1.4%) and Italian being third ( 0.7%).

As of 2000, the gender distribution of the population was 56.0% male and 44.0% female. The age distribution, as of 2000, in Valzeina is; 24 children or 17.1% of the population are between 0 and 9 years old and 18 teenagers or 12.9% are between 10 and 19. Of the adult population, 13 people or 9.3% of the population are between 20 and 29 years old. 29 people or 20.7% are between 30 and 39, 15 people or 10.7% are between 40 and 49, and 14 people or 10.0% are between 50 and 59. The senior population distribution is 12 people or 8.6% of the population are between 60 and 69 years old, 9 people or 6.4% are between 70 and 79, there are 5 people or 3.6% who are between 80 and 89 there is 1 person who is between 90 and 99.

In the 2007 federal election the most popular party was the SP which received 39.2% of the vote. The next three most popular parties were the SVP (35.9%), the FDP (9.9%) and the local, small right-wing parties (6.6%).

The entire Swiss population is generally well educated. In Valzeina about 67.2% of the population (between age 25-64) have completed either non-mandatory upper secondary education or additional higher education (either University or a Fachhochschule).

Valzeina has an unemployment rate of 1.03%. As of 2005, there were 37 people employed in the primary economic sector and about 17 businesses involved in this sector. 4 people are employed in the secondary sector and there is 1 business in this sector. 6 people are employed in the tertiary sector, with 3 businesses in this sector.

The historical population is given in the following table:

year	population
1850	243
1900	216
1950	216
1980	115
2000	140
