= Seewis im Prättigau =

- Municipality
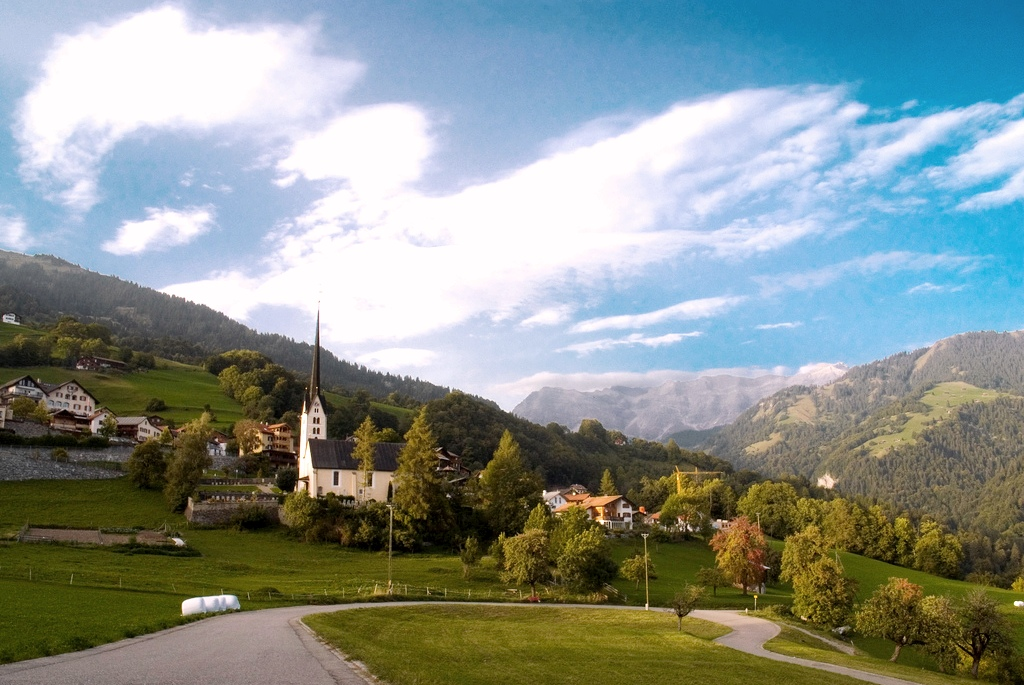

- Flag Coat of arms
- Location of Seewis im Prättigau
- Location within Switzerland Location within Canton of Grisons
- Coordinates: 46.9889°N 9.6376°E 46.9888567, 9.6375632
- Country: Switzerland
- Canton: Grisons
- District: Prättigau/Davos

Area
  - Total: 49.63 km^{2} (19.16 sq mi)
- Elevation: 937 m (3,074 ft)

Population (December 2020)
  - Total: 1,376
  - Density: 27.73/km^{2} (71.81/sq mi)
- Time zone: UTC+01:00 (CET)
  - Summer (DST): UTC+02:00 (CEST)
- Postal code: 7212, 7214
- SFOS number: 3972
- ISO 3166 code: CH-GR
- Surrounded by: Brand (AT-8), Fanas, Grüsch, Jenins, Maienfeld, Malans, Nenzing (AT-8), Schiers, Valzeina, Vandans (AT-8)
- Website: www.seewis.ch

Seewis im Prättigau is a Swiss village in the Prättigau and a municipality in the Prättigau/Davos Region in the canton of the Grisons.

== History ==
Seewis im Prättigau is first mentioned in 1224 as de Sevve.

In 1622, Fidelis of Sigmaringen a Capuchin friar, was martyred in the Counter-Reformation at Seewis.

== Geography ==
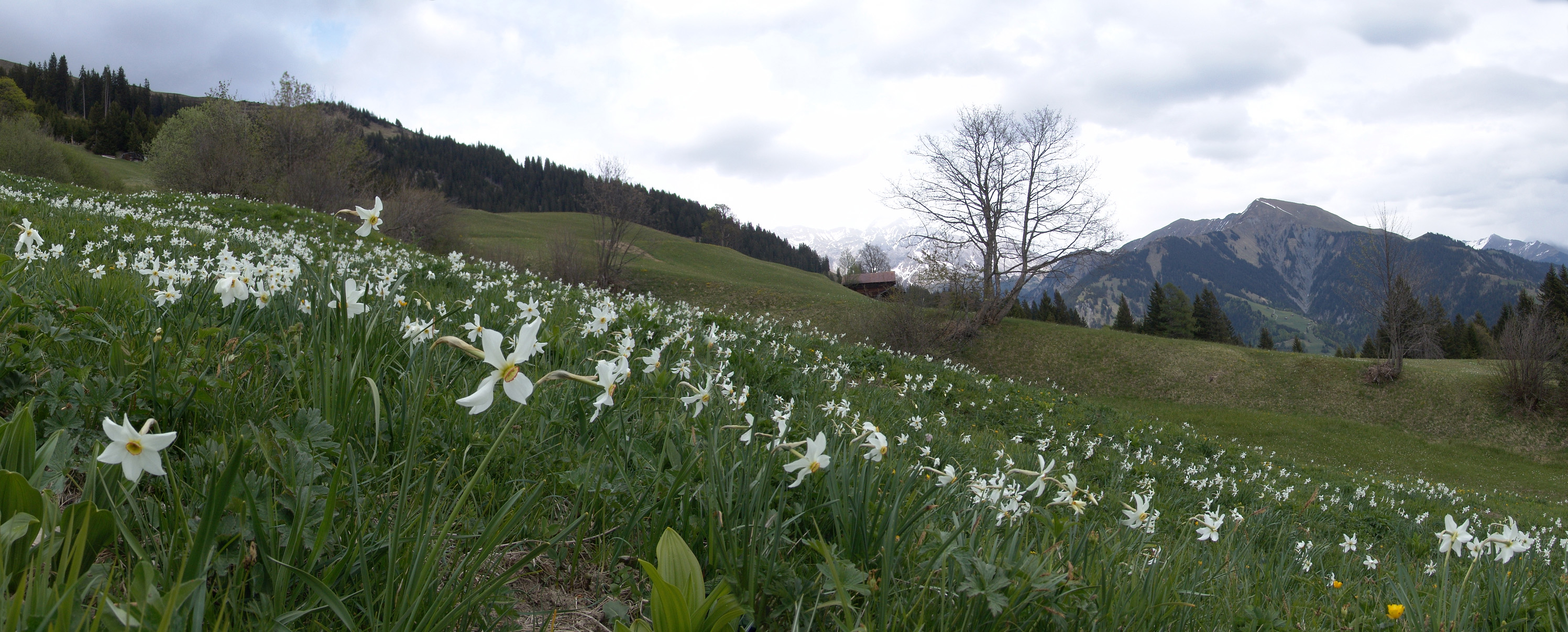
Narcissus or Daffodils near Seewis

Aerial view by Walter Mittelholzer (1923)

Seewis im Prättigau has an area, as of 2006, of 49.6 km^{2} (19.2 sq mi). Of this area, 41.3% is used for agricultural purposes, while 34% is forested. Of the rest of the land, 2% is settled (buildings or roads) and the remainder (22.6%) is non-productive (rivers, glaciers or mountains).

Before 2017, the municipality was located in the Seewis sub-district of the Prättigau/Davos district, after 2017 it was part of the Prättigau/Davos Region. It is located on a terrace on the right valley side at the entrance to the Prättigau valley. It consists of the village of Seewis im Prättigau and the sections of Schmitten-Pardisla and the Seewis-Pardisla railway station on the valley floor. Until 1961 Seewis im Prättigau was known as Seewis im Prätigau.

== Demographics ==
Seewis im Prättigau has a population (as of 31 December 2020) of 1,376. As of 2008, 10.7% of the population was made up of foreign nationals. Over the last 10 years the population has grown at a rate of 9%. Most of the population (as of 2000) speaks German (93.3%), with Albanian being second most common ( 2.3%) and Serbo-Croatian being third ( 1.3%).

As of 2000, the gender distribution of the population was 48.5% male and 51.5% female. The age distribution, as of 2000, in Seewis im Prättigau is; 202 children or 15.3% of the population are between 0 and 9 years old and 195 teenagers or 14.7% are between 10 and 19. Of the adult population, 128 people or 9.7% of the population are between 20 and 29 years old. 223 people or 16.9% are between 30 and 39, 188 people or 14.2% are between 40 and 49, and 129 people or 9.8% are between 50 and 59. The senior population distribution is 101 people or 7.6% of the population are between 60 and 69 years old, 91 people or 6.9% are between 70 and 79, there are 61 people or 4.6% who are between 80 and 89 there are 5 people or 0.4% who are between 90 and 99.

In the 2007 federal election the most popular party was the SVP which received 38.8% of the vote. The next three most popular parties were the SP (25.8%), the FDP (23.1%) and the CVP (6%).

In Seewis im Prättigau about 68.5% of the population (between age 25-64) have completed either non-mandatory upper secondary education or additional higher education (either university or a Fachhochschule).

Seewis im Prättigau has an unemployment rate of 0.84%. As of 2005, there were 104 people employed in the primary economic sector and about 38 businesses involved in this sector. 234 people are employed in the secondary sector and there are 15 businesses in this sector. 208 people are employed in the tertiary sector, with 41 businesses in this sector.

From the 2000 census, 186 or 14.1% are Roman Catholic, while 923 or 69.8% belonged to the Swiss Reformed Church. Of the rest of the population, and there are 34 individuals (or about 2.57% of the population) who belong to another Christian church. There are 74 (or about 5.59% of the population) who are Islamic. There are 4 individuals (or about 0.30% of the population) who belong to another church (not listed on the census), 64 (or about 4.84% of the population) belong to no church, are agnostic or atheist, and 38 individuals (or about 2.87% of the population) did not answer the question.

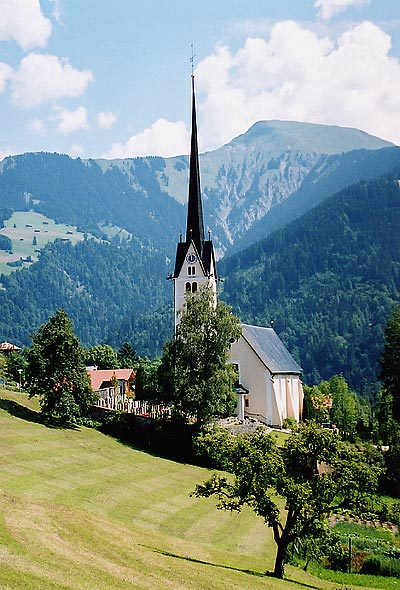
Church in Seewis

The historical population is given in the following table:

year	population
1850	791
1900	901
1950	955
1970	923
2000	1,323

== Heritage sites of national significance ==
The ruins of Castle Fracstein are listed as a Swiss heritage site of national significance.

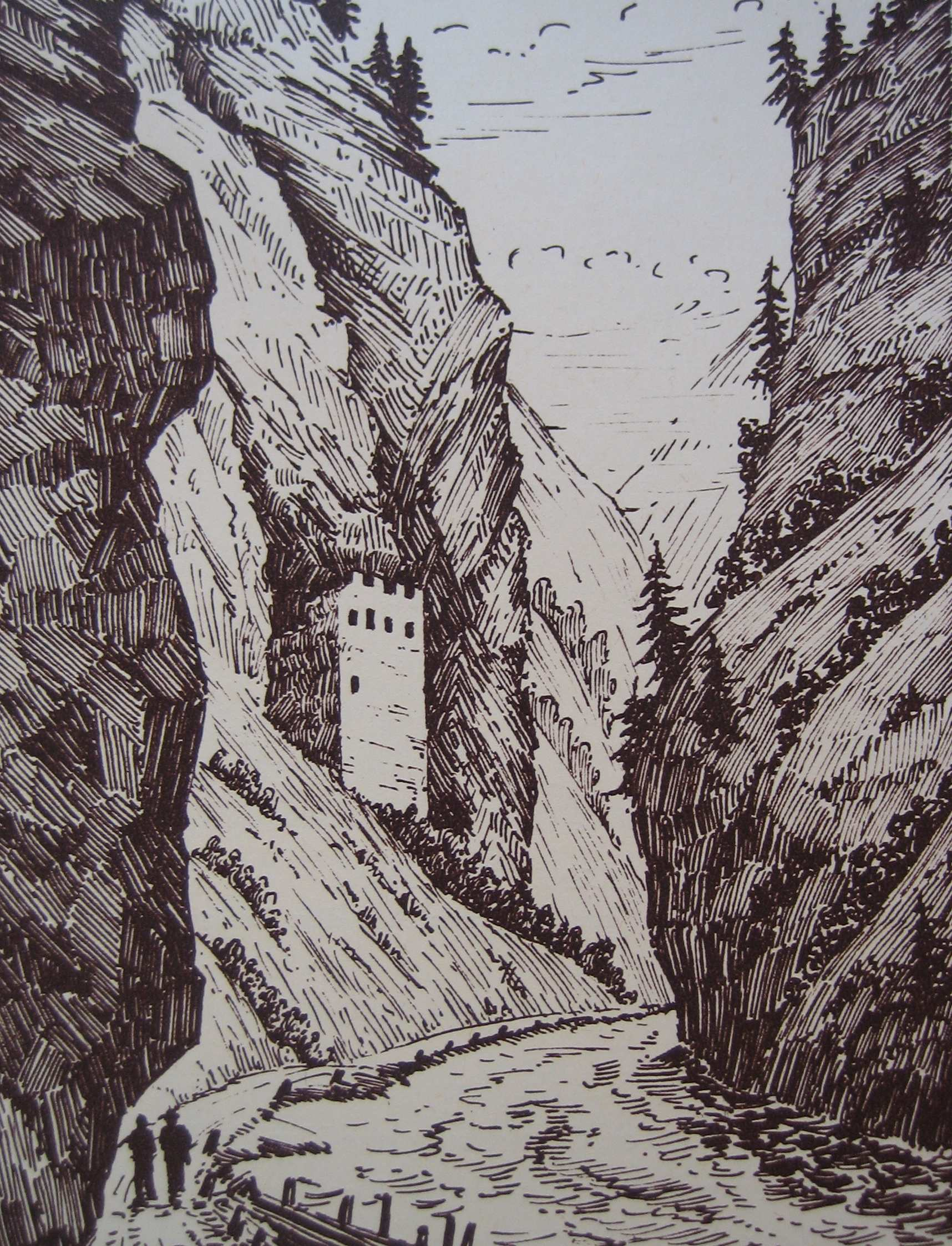
Castle Fracstein in 1830

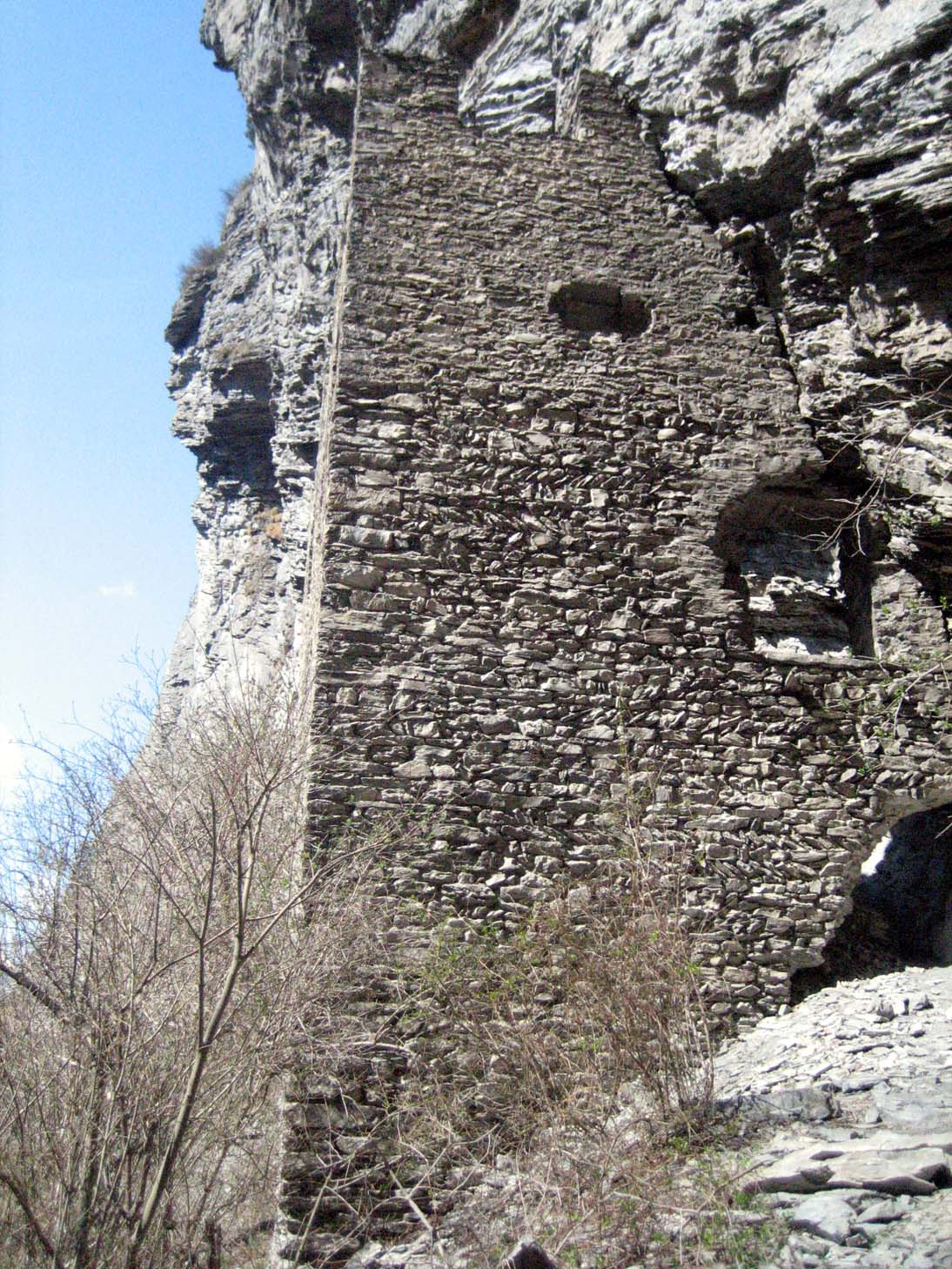
Fracstein castle from the south

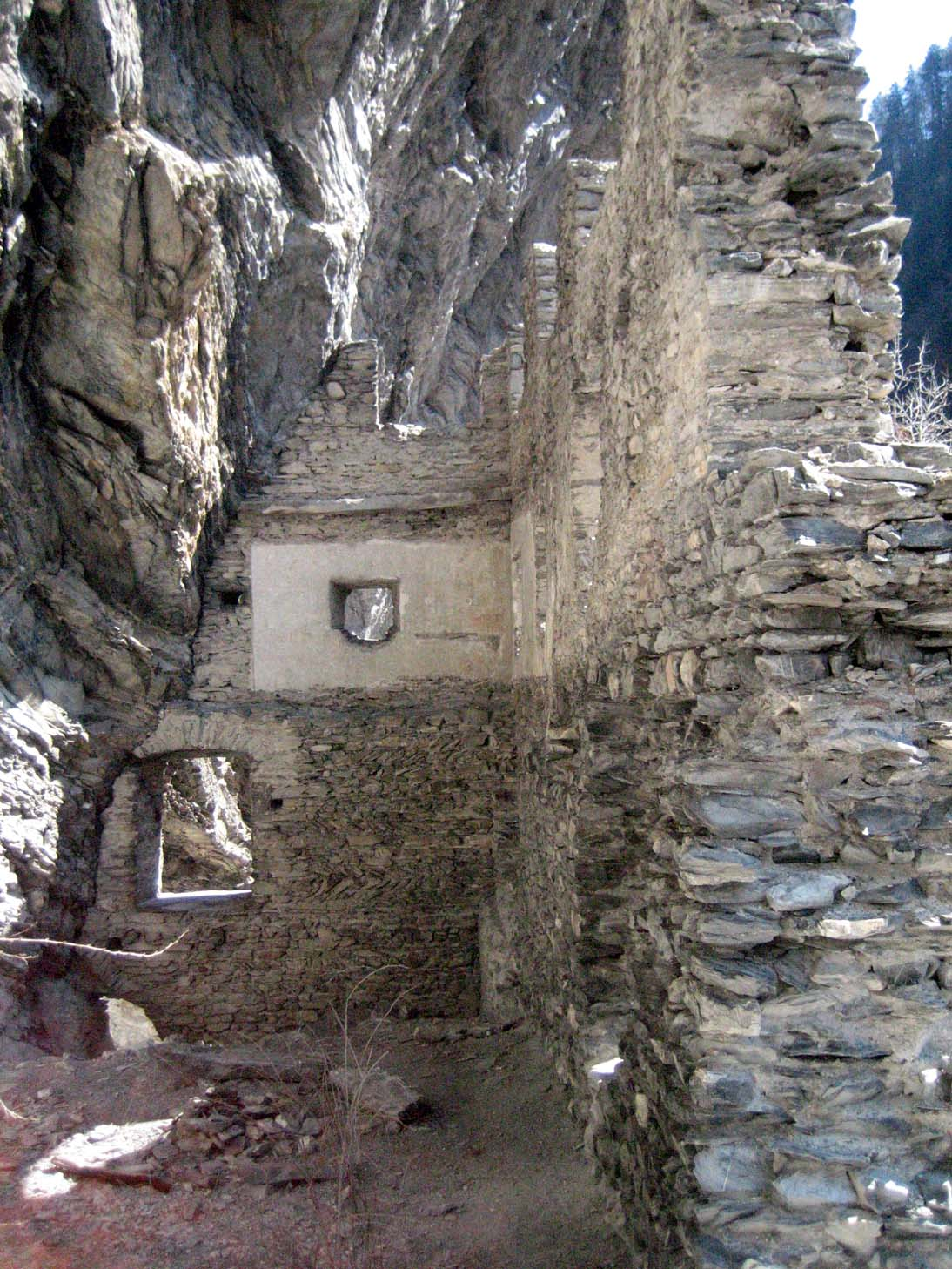
Fracstein interior

== Transportation ==
The municipality has a railway station, Seewis-Pardisla, on the Landquart–Davos Platz line. It has regular services to Rhäzüns and Schiers.
