= Fracstein Castle =

Castle in Switzerland

- Burgruine Fracstein
- Seewis im Prättigau
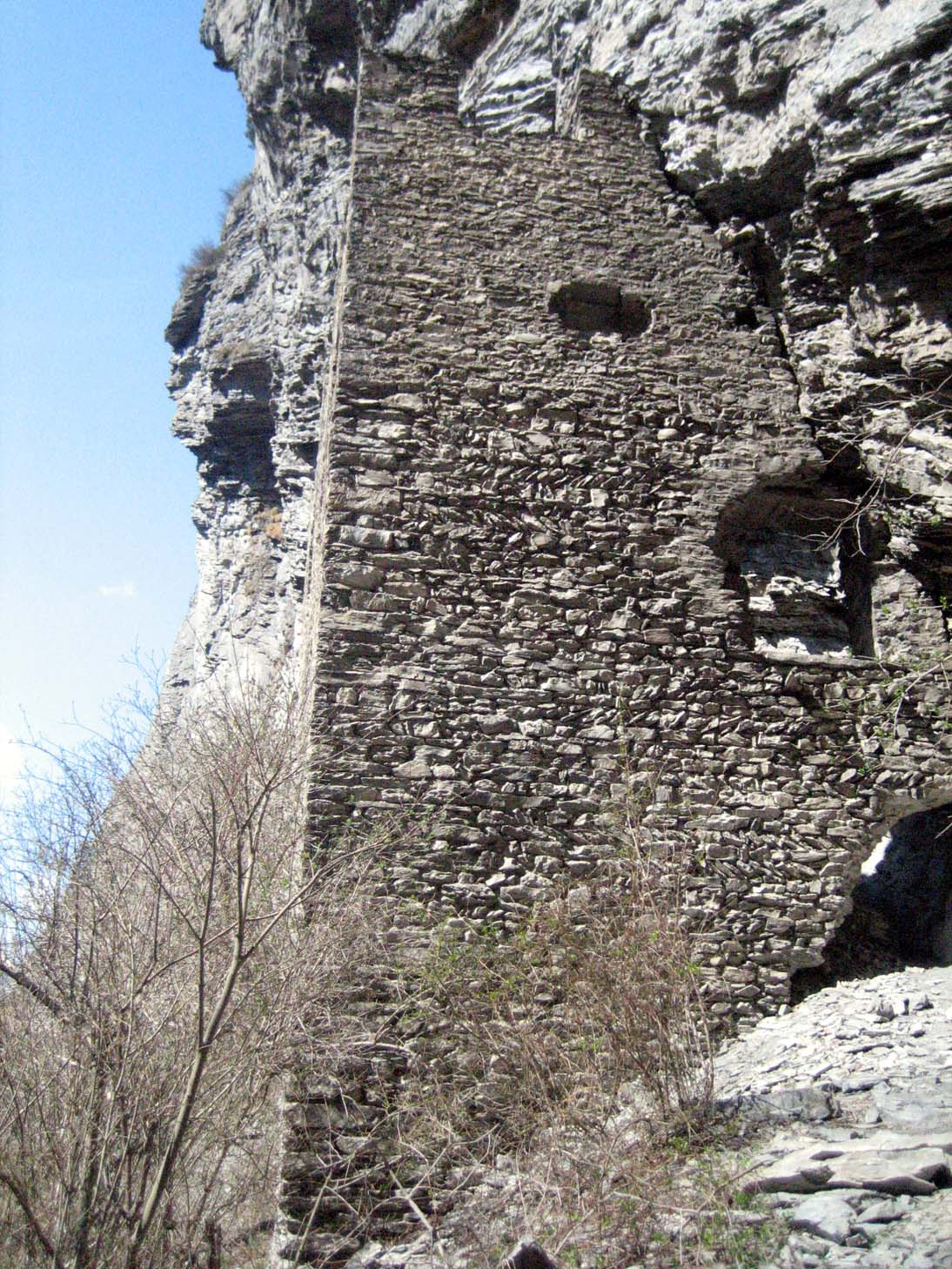
- Remains of the outer wall

Site information
- Type: Cave castle
- Code: CH-GR
- Condition: ruin

Location
- Location within Canton of Graubünden Location within Switzerland
- Coordinates: 46°58′33″N 9°37′00″E

Site history
- Built: about 1200
- Materials: Rubble stone

Garrison information
- Occupants: free nobility

Fracstein Castle is a castle in the municipality of Seewis im Prättigau of the Canton of Graubünden in Switzerland. It is a Swiss heritage site of national significance.

== History ==
The castle was probably built in the 11th or 12th century, perhaps for the Lords of Aspermont. Its location above a narrow part of the Prättigau valley means it was built to control and collect tolls from trade through the valley. The castle was extensively rebuilt in the 13th century and first appears in historical records in 1338. In that year the brothers Eberhardt and Ulrich von Aspermont, who had inherited the castle from their father, sold Fracstein to Count Friedrich V von Toggenburg. Friedrich then appointed Ulrich von Matsch as his vogt over the castle and surrounding lands. A few years later, in 1344, the Matsch and Toggenburg families divided their lands in the Prättigau, however Fracstein was specifically left as a shared castle. In 1436 the last Toggenburg Count, Frederick VII died and the castle was fully inherited by the Matsch family. They sold it to the Habsburgs in 1466. Soon thereafter the Habsburgs abandoned the castle and by 1570 it was a ruin. The castle church of St. Aper, located below and east of the castle, remained in use until about 1530.

During the Bündner Wirren the castle site was once again occupied. In 1621 the Austrians built a barricade near the old toll station and garrisoned the castle with a small force in the following year. Soon thereafter they were forced to abandon Fracstein by anti-Habsburg rebels. In October 1624 Prättigau forces briefly garrisoned the castle. In 1649 the villages of the Prättigau bought their freedom from the Habsburgs and Fracstein became part of Schiers. The communities agreed to pay for the upkeep of the road through the valley and the castle's bridge over the Landquart River, but allowed the castle to remain a ruin.

During the 1799 French invasion of Graubünden the Prättigau militia attempted to defend the narrow point in the valley at Fracstein, but were quickly forced to retreat. During the 19th century, the fortifications on the valley floor were mostly destroyed to provide space and building material for a railroad and a road through the valley.

During a renovation project in the main tower, a number of carvings from around 1300 were discovered. They included coats of arms of many of the noble families in the valley, castles topped with wooden structures, palisades and other designs.

== Castle site ==
The castle is built into an overhang on a cliff on the north side of narrow point in the valley and the Landquart River. In addition to the castle, Fracstein included a rectory and the church of St. Aper east of the castle along the cliff and a tower and toll station along the river, with a wall that stretched from the cliff to the river across the valley.

Only the palas of the castle still remains. It is about 19 meters (62 ft) long and three stories tall. The main entrance was into the second story on the east wall. Living quarters were on the third floor and the space was divided into two rooms by a wooden partition. These rooms had large windows on the valley side. Some of the medieval plaster is still visible on the third floor including a number of carvings from around 1300. The castle was supplied with water through wooden pipes from the top of the cliff.

About 80 m (260 ft) east of the castle stood the rectory. Today only one wall of the three-story building is still standing. About 10 m (33 ft) east of the rectory is the site of the church. However, today no trace of the building remains.

The wall or Letzi stretches from the south-east corner of the castle to the river. The gate on the valley road was a pointed arch and had a gate house that was about 6.5 m × 6.5 m (21 ft × 21 ft). The gate and gatehouse along with much of the wall were demolished during construction of the railroad and new road along the valley floor.

== The castle's name ==
Several different root words have been suggested for the name Fracstein. It might have come from fractus meaning broken. Another theory comes from the castle being called Fragestein in 1338 and Fragstein later. If that was the original name, then the root word might have been fragen (questions) or aufragen (to stand up).

== Gallery ==
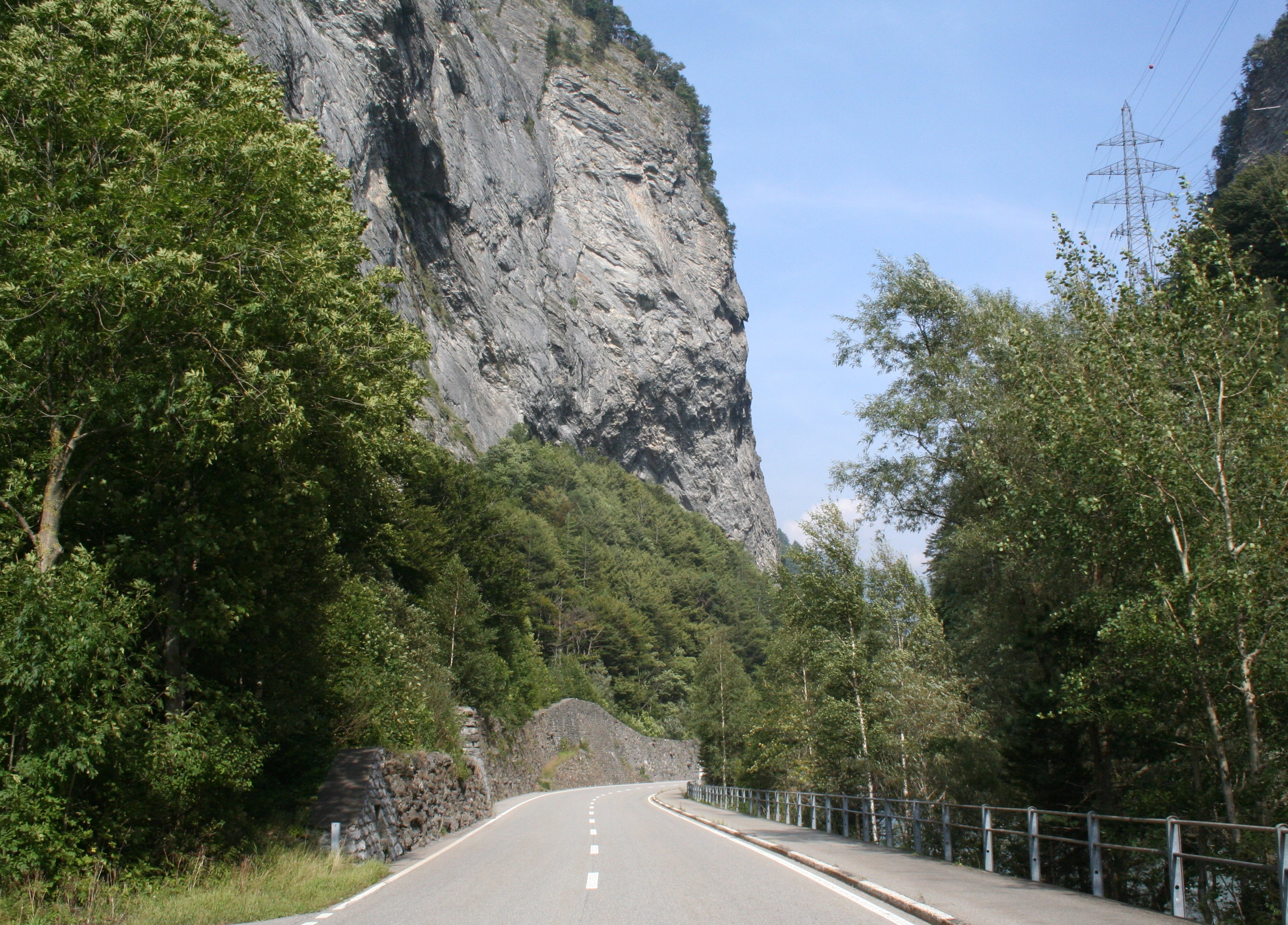
Fracstein is located at the base of the cliff

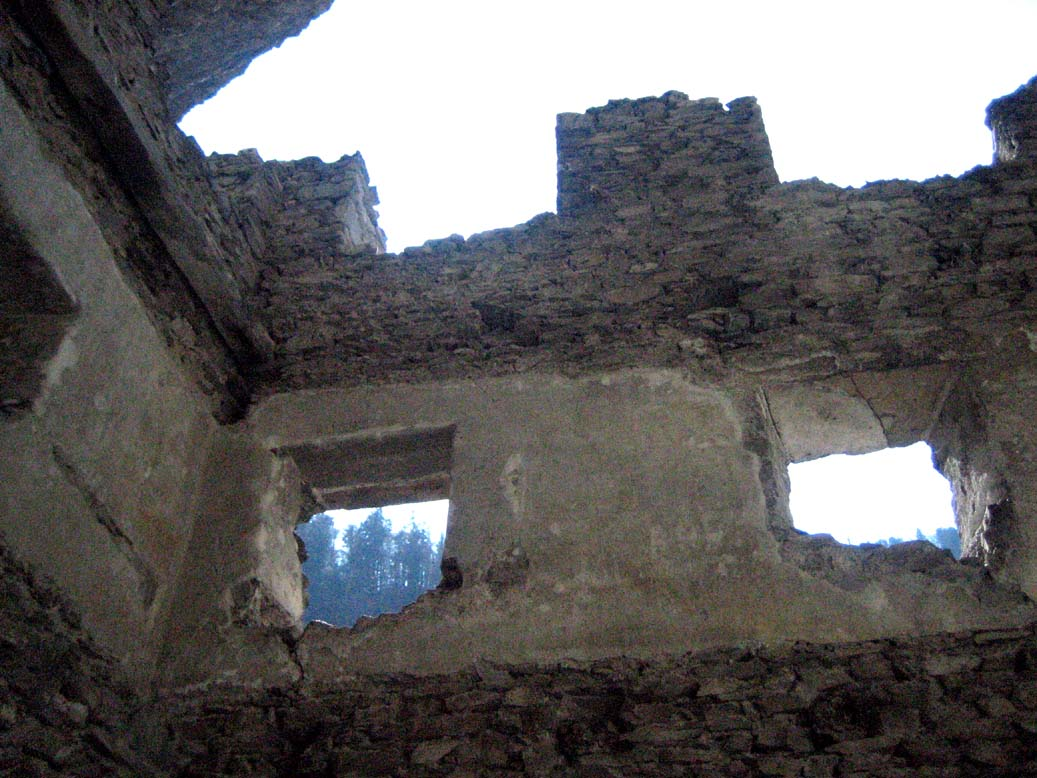
Southwall

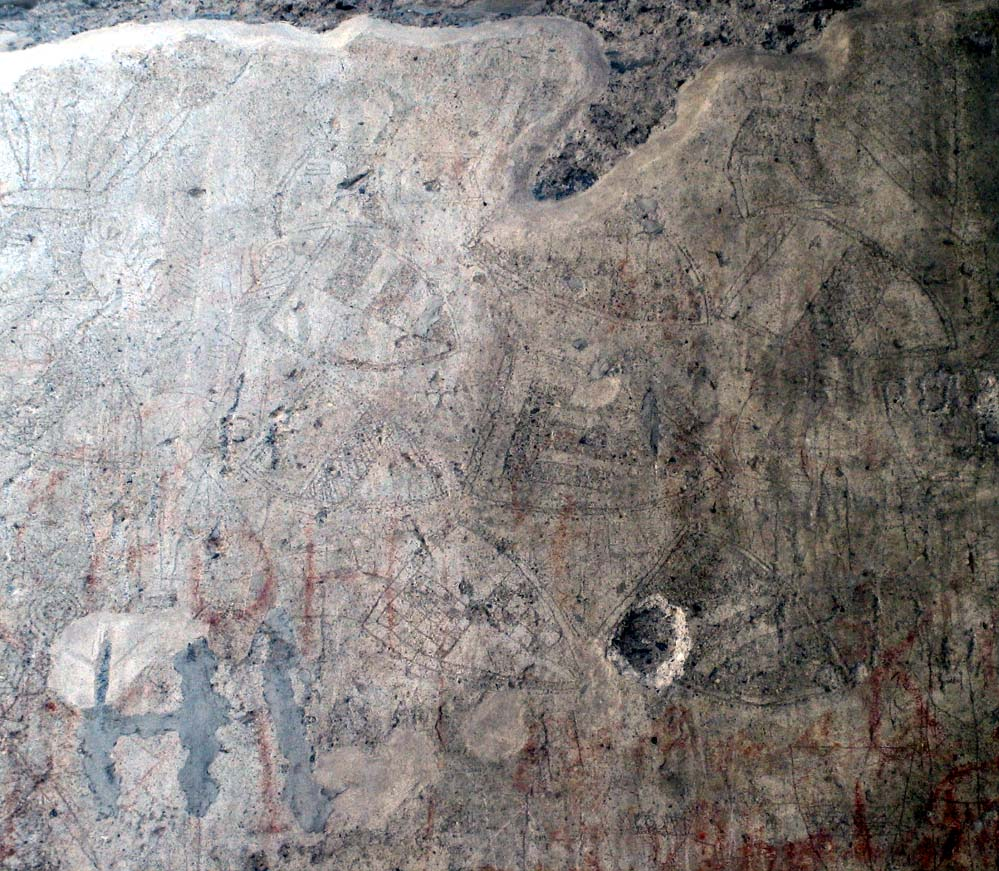
Carvings on the east wall

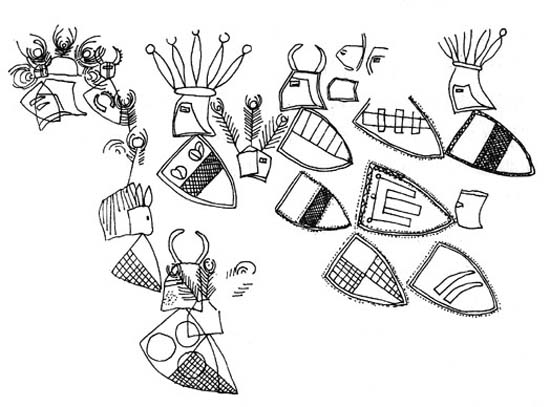
Reconstruction of the carvings

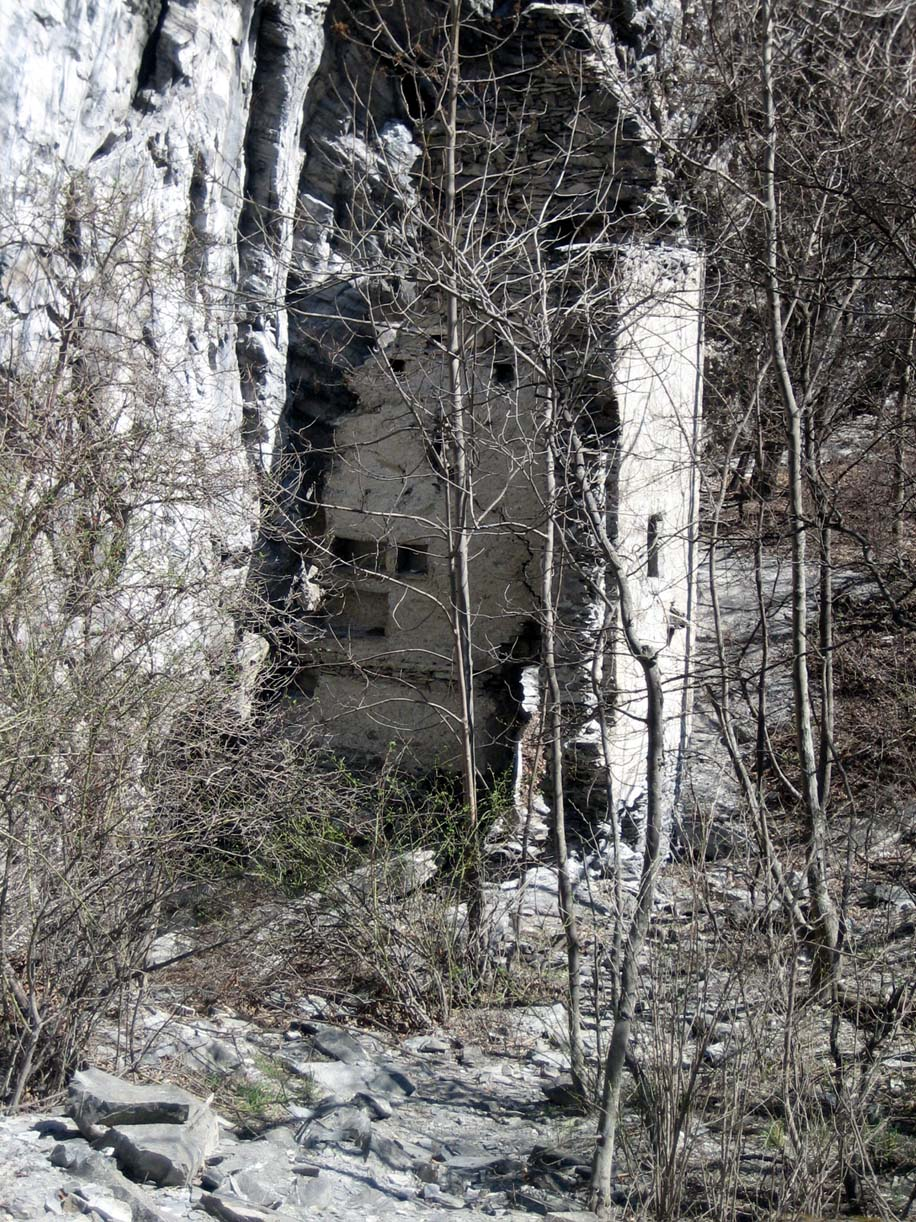
Castle priest's house

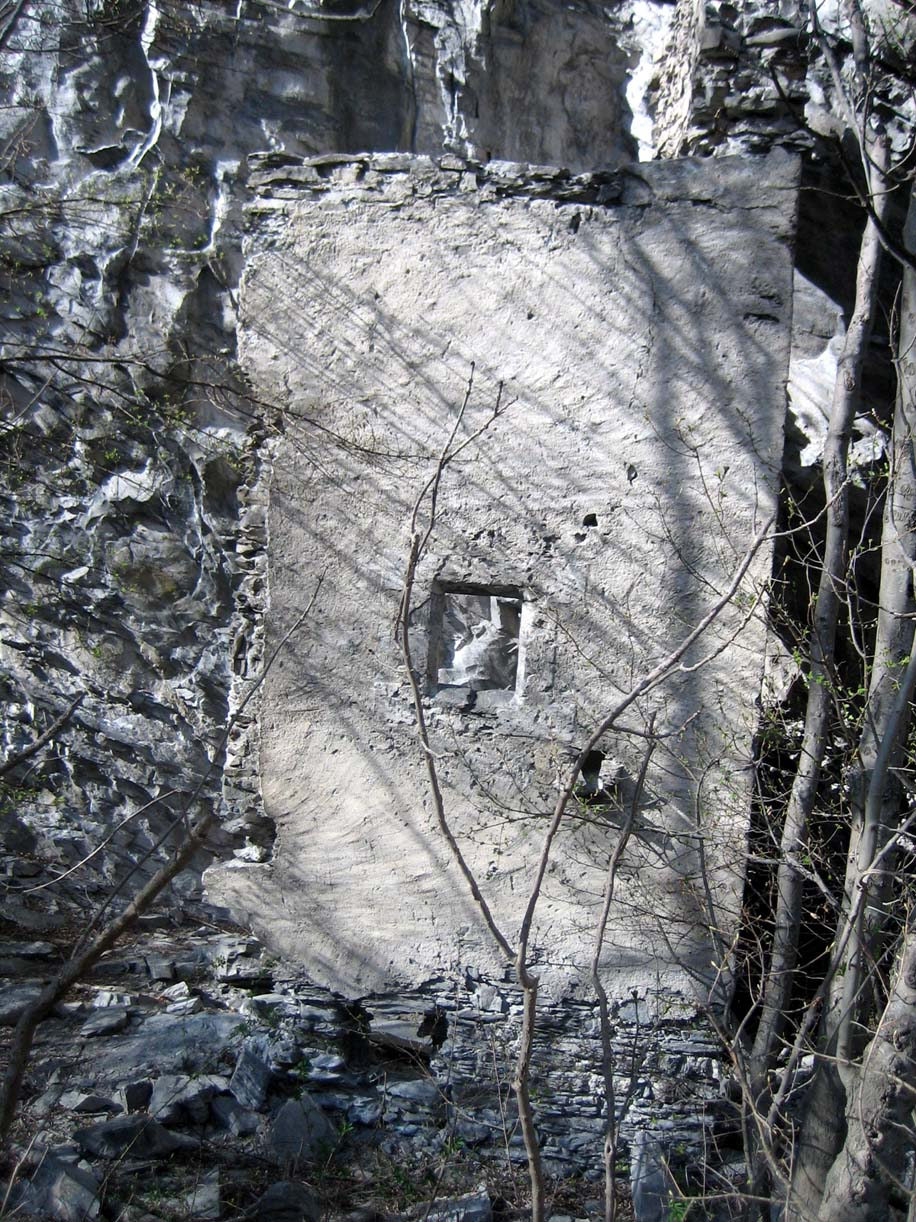
South facade of the priest's house

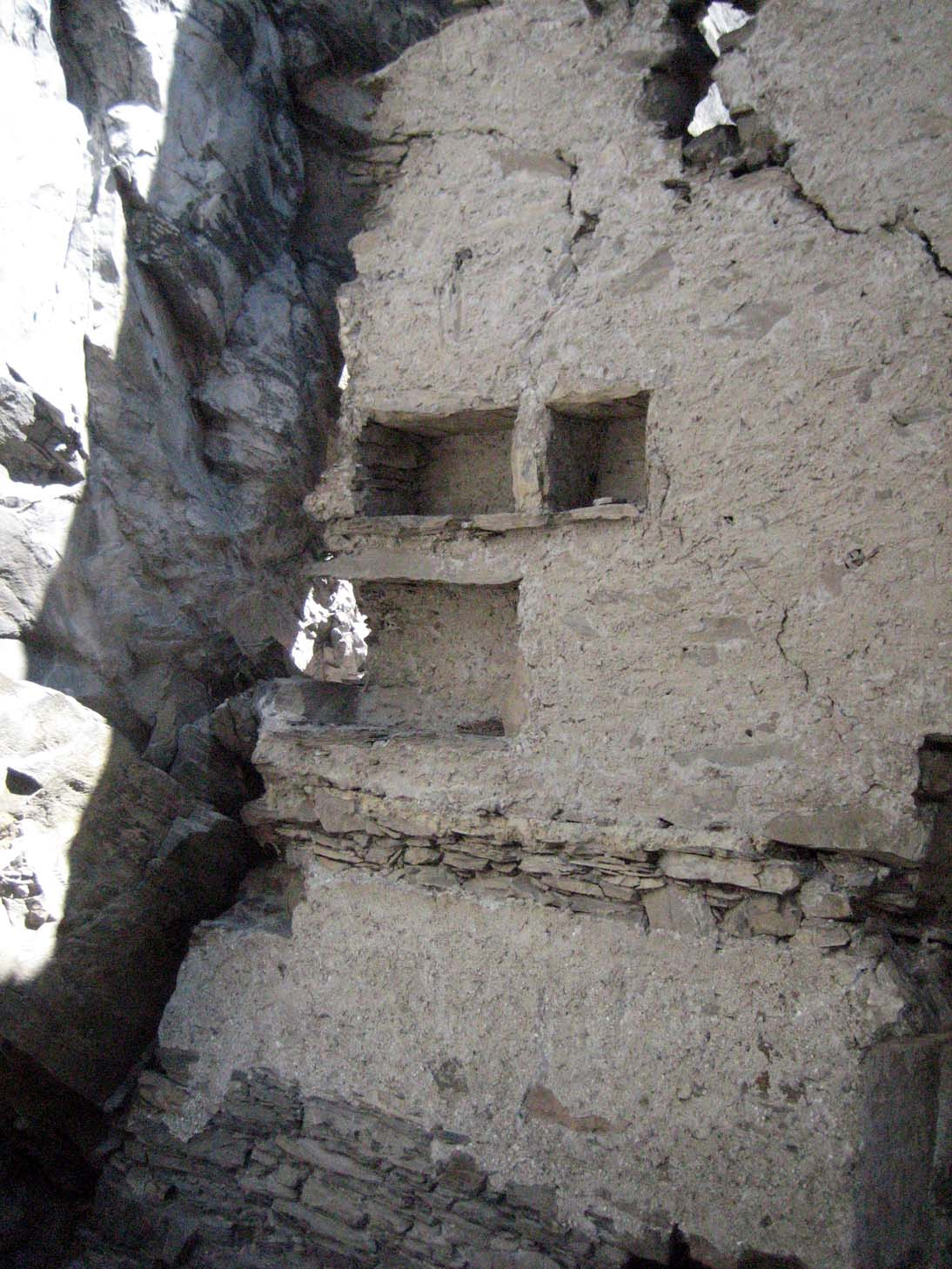
Eastern inner wall

== See also ==
- List of castles in Switzerland

== Literature ==
- Werner Meyer: Burgen der Schweiz. Band 3: Kanton Graubünden. Deutschsprachiger und romanischer Teil. Zürich 1983
- Maria-Letizia Boscardin: Die Grottenburg Fracstein und ihre Ritzzeichnungen. In: Schweizer Beiträge zur Kulturgeschichte und Archäologie des Mittelalters. Band 4. Olten 1977
- Fritz Hauswirth: Burgen und Schlösser in der Schweiz, Band 8, Neptun Verlag Kreuzlingen, 1972
- Anton von Castelmur: Die Burgen und Schlösser des Kantons Graubünden, Band I, Birkhäuser-Verlag, Basel 1940
- Burgenkarte der Schweiz, Ausgabe 2007, Bundesamt für Landestopografie/Schweizerischer Burgenverein
- Heinrich Boxler, Burgennamengebung in der Nordostschweiz und in Graubünden, Verlag Huber, Frauenfeld 1976
