= Grüsch =

- Municipality
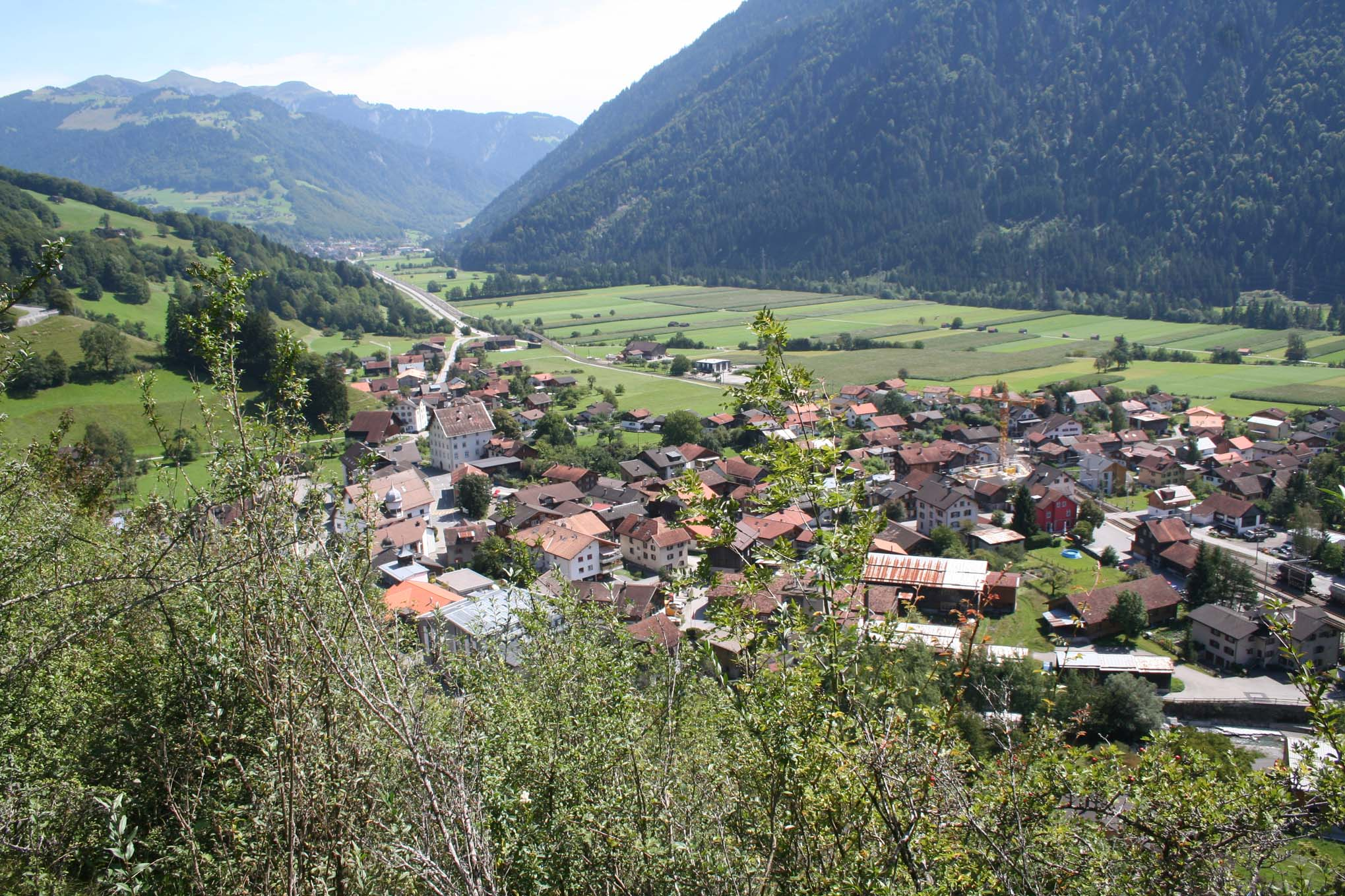

- Flag Coat of arms
- Location of Grüsch
- Location within Switzerland Location within Canton of Grisons
- Coordinates: 46°58′N 9°38′E
- Country: Switzerland
- Canton: Grisons
- District: Prättigau/Davos

Government
  - Mayor: Georg Niggli

Area
  - Total: 43.30 km^{2} (16.72 sq mi)
- Elevation: 629 m (2,064 ft)

Population (December 2020)
  - Total: 2,115
  - Density: 48.85/km^{2} (126.5/sq mi)
- Time zone: UTC+01:00 (CET)
  - Summer (DST): UTC+02:00 (CEST)
- Postal code: 7214
- SFOS number: 3961
- ISO 3166 code: CH-GR
- Surrounded by: Fanas, Furna, Schiers, Seewis im Prättigau, Valzeina
- Website: www.gruesch.ch

Grüsch is a Swiss village in the Prättigau and a municipality in the political district Prättigau/Davos Region in the canton of the Grisons. On 1 January 2011, the former municipalities of Fanas and Valzeina were merged with Grüsch.

== History ==
Grüsch is first mentioned about 1340 as Grusch. In 1375 it was mentioned as Crüsch.

== Geography ==
Grüsch has an area, as of 2006, of 10 km^{2} (3.9 sq mi). Of this area, 39.5% is used for agricultural purposes, while 51.3% is forested. Of the rest of the land, 6.2% is settled (buildings or roads) and the remainder (3%) is non-productive (rivers, glaciers or mountains).

Before 2017, the municipality was located in the Schiers sub-district of the Prättigau/Davos district on a scree slope above the Taschinasbach. It consists of the Haufendorf village (an irregular, unplanned and quite closely packed village, built around a central square) of Grüsch and the hamlets of Überlandquart und Cavadura (since 1874).

== Demographics ==
Grüsch has a population (as of 31 December 2020) of 2,115. As of 2008, 7.2% of the population was made up of foreign nationals. Over the last 10 years the population has grown at a rate of 5.8%. Most of the population (as of 2000) speaks German (94.4%), with Serbo-Croatian being second most common ( 1.7%) and Romansh being third ( 0.7%).

As of 2000, the gender distribution of the population was 48.5% male and 51.5% female. The age distribution, as of 2000, in Grüsch is; 160 children or 13.2% of the population are between 0 and 9 years old and 193 teenagers or 16.0% are between 10 and 19. Of the adult population, 126 people or 10.4% of the population are between 20 and 29 years old. 177 people or 14.6% are between 30 and 39, 207 people or 17.1% are between 40 and 49, and 121 people or 10.0% are between 50 and 59. The senior population distribution is 97 people or 8.0% of the population are between 60 and 69 years old, 79 people or 6.5% are between 70 and 79, there are 48 people or 4.0% who are between 80 and 89 there are 2 people or 0.2% who are between 90 and 99.

In the 2007 federal election the most popular party was the FDP which received 38.8% of the vote. The next three most popular parties were the SVP (35.7%), the SP (18.3%) and the CVP (4.6%).

The entire Swiss population is generally well educated. In Grüsch about 70.9% of the population (between age 25-64) have completed either non-mandatory upper secondary education or additional higher education (either university or a Fachhochschule).

Grüsch has an unemployment rate of 0.78%. As of 2005, there were 63 people employed in the primary economic sector and about 25 businesses involved in this sector. 556 people are employed in the secondary sector and there are 18 businesses in this sector. 160 people are employed in the tertiary sector, with 44 businesses in this sector.

From the 2000 census, 172 or 14.2% are Roman Catholic, while 878 or 72.6% belonged to the Swiss Reformed Church. Of the rest of the population, there are 21 individuals (or about 1.74% of the population) who belong to the Orthodox Church, and there are 25 individuals (or about 2.07% of the population) who belong to another Christian church. There are 21 (or about 1.74% of the population) who are Islamic. There are 6 individuals (or about 0.50% of the population) who belong to another church (not listed on the census), 61 (or about 5.04% of the population) belong to no church, are agnostic or atheist, and 26 individuals (or about 2.15% of the population) did not answer the question.

The historical population is given in the following table:

year	population
1850	614
1880	577
1888	681
1900	629
1950	726
1970	709

== Transportation ==
The municipality has a railway station, Grüsch, on the Landquart–Davos Platz line. It has regular service to Landquart, Davos Platz, Rhäzüns, and Schiers.

== Weather ==
Grüsch has an average of 138.9 days of rain per year and on average receives 1,210 mm (48 in) of precipitation. The wettest month is August during which time Grüsch receives an average of 132 mm (5.2 in) of precipitation. During this month there is precipitation for an average of 13.8 days. The driest month of the year is October with an average of 69 mm (2.7 in) of precipitation over 13.8 days.
