= Furna =

- Municipality
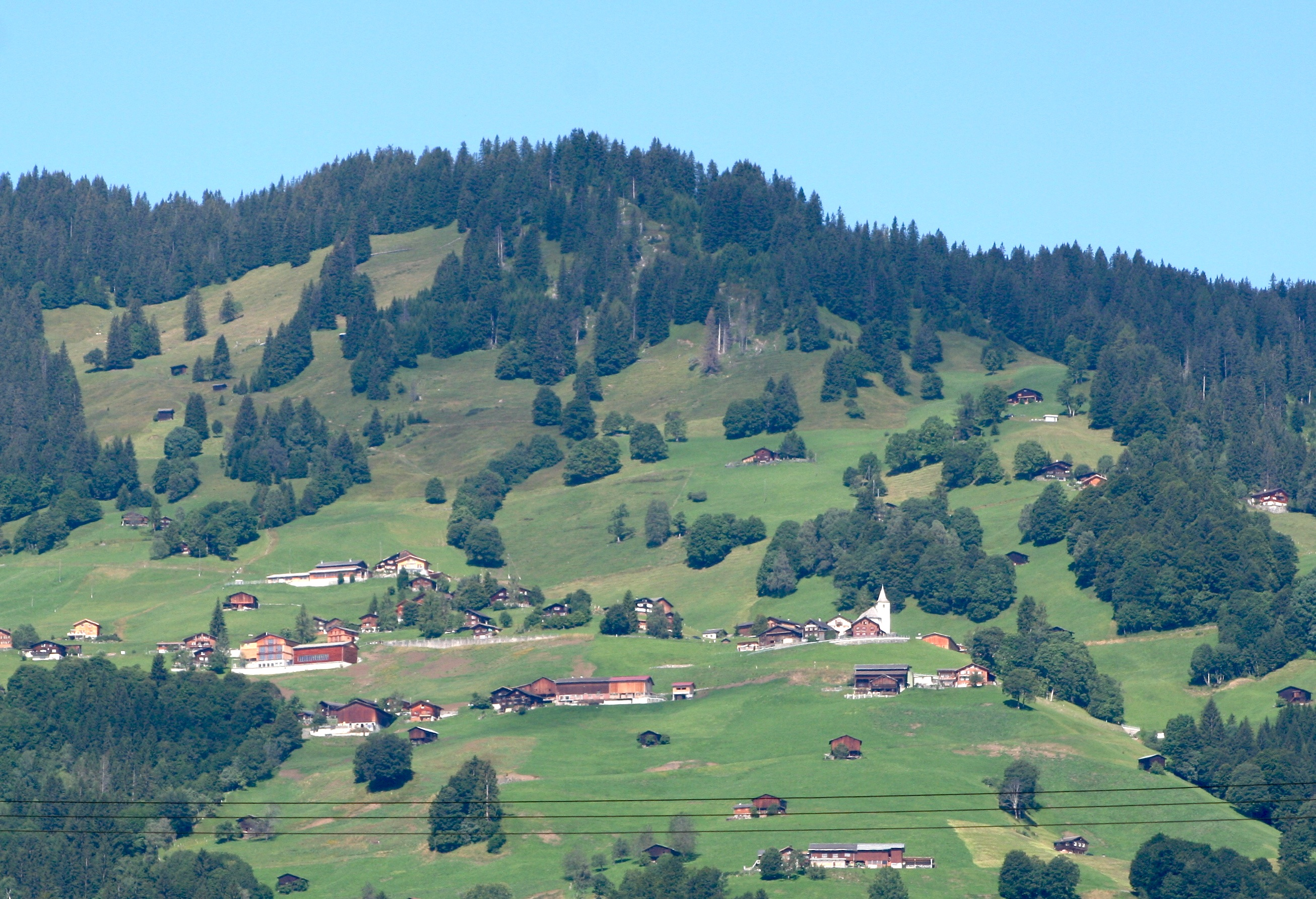

- Flag Coat of arms
- Location of Furna
- Location within Switzerland Location within Canton of Grisons
- Coordinates: 46°56′N 9°40′E
- Country: Switzerland
- Canton: Grisons
- District: Prättigau/Davos

Area
  - Total: 33.25 km^{2} (12.84 sq mi)
- Elevation: 1,400 m (4,600 ft)

Population (December 2020)
  - Total: 207
  - Density: 6.23/km^{2} (16.1/sq mi)
- Time zone: UTC+01:00 (CET)
  - Summer (DST): UTC+02:00 (CEST)
- Postal code: 7232
- SFOS number: 3862
- ISO 3166 code: CH-GR
- Surrounded by: Grüsch, Jenaz, Peist, St. Peter-Pagig, Schiers, Trimmis, Valzeina
- Website: www.furna.ch

Furna (Highest Alemannic: Furnä) is a Swiss village in the Prättigau and a municipality in the political district Prättigau/Davos Region in the canton of the Grisons.

== History ==
Furna is first mentioned in 1479 as Furnen.

== Demographics ==
Furna has a population (as of 31 December 2020) of 207. As of 2008, 0.5% of the population was made up of foreign nationals. Over the last 10 years the population has grown at a rate of 0.5%. Most of the population (as of 2000) speaks German (99.5%), with the rest speaking Norwegian ( 0.5%).

As of 2000, the gender distribution of the population was 49.3% male and 50.7% female. The age distribution, as of 2000, in Furna is; 34 children or 16.7% of the population are between 0 and 9 years old and 17 teenagers or 8.3% are between 10 and 19. Of the adult population, 24 people or 11.8% of the population are between 20 and 29 years old. 27 people or 13.2% are between 30 and 39, 24 people or 11.8% are between 40 and 49, and 22 people or 10.8% are between 50 and 59. The senior population distribution is 24 people or 11.8% of the population are between 60 and 69 years old, 26 people or 12.7% are between 70 and 79, there are 6 people or 2.9% who are between 80 and 89.

In the 2007 federal election the most popular party was the SVP which received 49.8% of the vote. The next three most popular parties were the FDP (23%), the local, small right-wing parties (13.8%) and the SP (13%).

The entire Swiss population is generally well educated. In Furna about 60.8% of the population (between age 25-64) have completed either non-mandatory upper secondary education or additional higher education (either university or a Fachhochschule).

Furna has an unemployment rate of 0%. As of 2005, there were 52 people employed in the primary economic sector and about 21 businesses involved in this sector. 4 people are employed in the secondary sector and there are 3 businesses in this sector. 17 people are employed in the tertiary sector, with 7 businesses in this sector.

The historical population is given in the following table:

year	population
1850	216
1900	209
1950	222
2000	204

== Geography ==
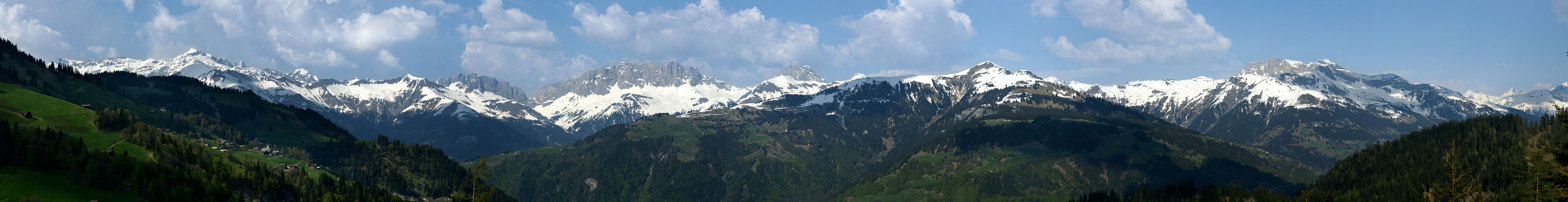
View from the Furna Hinterberg over the alpine road toward Alp Lerch

Furna has an area, as of 2006, of 33.3 km^{2} (12.9 sq mi). Of this area, 51.5% is used for agricultural purposes, while 38.3% is forested. Of the rest of the land, 1.3% is settled (buildings or roads) and the remainder (9%) is non-productive (rivers, glaciers or mountains).

Before 2017, the municipality was located in the Jenaz sub-district of the Prättigau/Davos district, after 2017 it was part of the Prättigau/Davos Region. It is a scattered settlement high above the valley. It consists of the village of Furna which is divided into Hinter-, Mittel- and Usserberg, as well as the seasonally occupied settlement of Furnerberg.
