= Klosters =

- Municipality
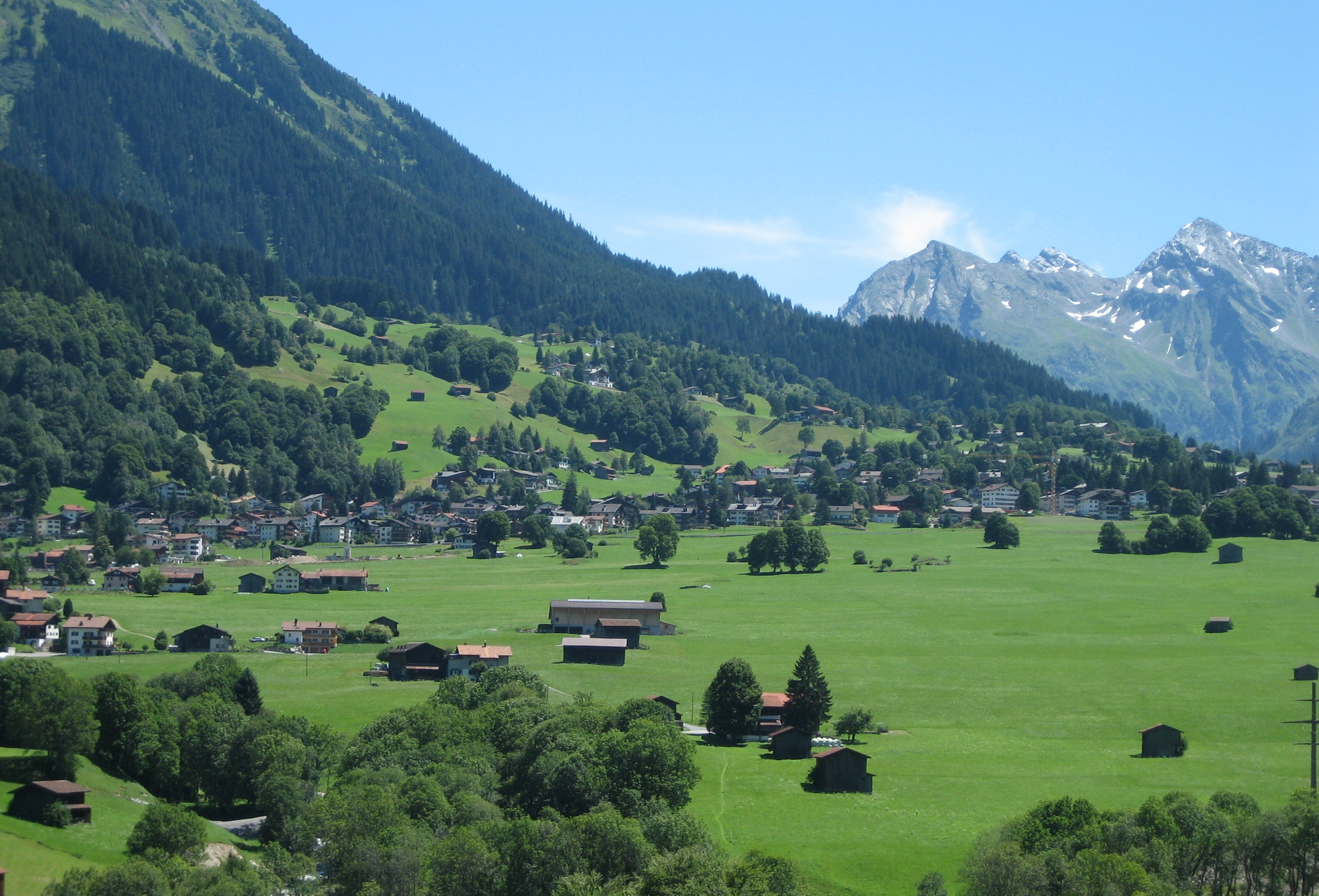
- Klosters Dorf

- Flag Coat of arms
- Location of Klosters
- Location within Switzerland Location within Canton of Grisons
- Coordinates: 46°53′N 9°53′E
- Country: Switzerland
- Canton: Grisons
- District: Prättigau/Davos

Area
  - Total: 193.16 km^{2} (74.58 sq mi)
- Elevation (Evang.-ref. Kirche Klosters Platz): 1,205 m (3,953 ft)
- Highest elevation (Verstanclahorn): 3,298 m (10,820 ft)

Population (December 2020)
  - Total: 4,416
  - Density: 22.86/km^{2} (59.21/sq mi)
- Time zone: UTC+01:00 (CET)
  - Summer (DST): UTC+02:00 (CEST)
- Postal codes: 7250 Klosters (Platz), 7252 Klosters Dorf
- SFOS number: 3871
- ISO 3166 code: CH-GR
- Localities: Platz, Dorf, Selfranga, Äuja, Monbiel
- Surrounded by: Conters im Prättigau, Davos, Gaschurn (AT-8), Langwies, Lavin, Sankt Gallenkirch (AT-8), Susch
- Website: www.klosters-serneus.ch

Klosters is a Swiss village in the Prättigau, administratively part of the municipality of Klosters-Serneus, which belongs to the district of Prättigau/Davos in the canton of Grisons; in 2021, the municipality shortened its name to Klosters. Klosters itself consists of the two main parts Klosters Dorf ('Village') and Kloster Platz ('Place'), and the settlements Selfranga, Äuja, Monbiel. Together with neighbouring Serneus, the two villages formed the municipality of Klosters-Serneus. On 1 January 2016, the former municipality of Saas im Prättigau merged into Klosters-Serneus.

Klosters is on the Austrian border. The village's ski resort lies 150 km (93 mi) from Zurich, the nearest international airport. Klosters is 10 km (6.2 mi) north from Davos and part of its extended ski area.

== History ==
Klosters is first mentioned in 1222 as ecclesiam sancti Iacobi. In 1436 it was mentioned as zuo dem Closter. It was part of one of the Three Leagues in the League of the Ten Jurisdictions. A part of the league's coat of arms is visible on Klosters' coat of arms.

== Geography ==
The Landquart River flows northwesterly through the village of Klosters and, along with various side streams, defines the geography of this region.

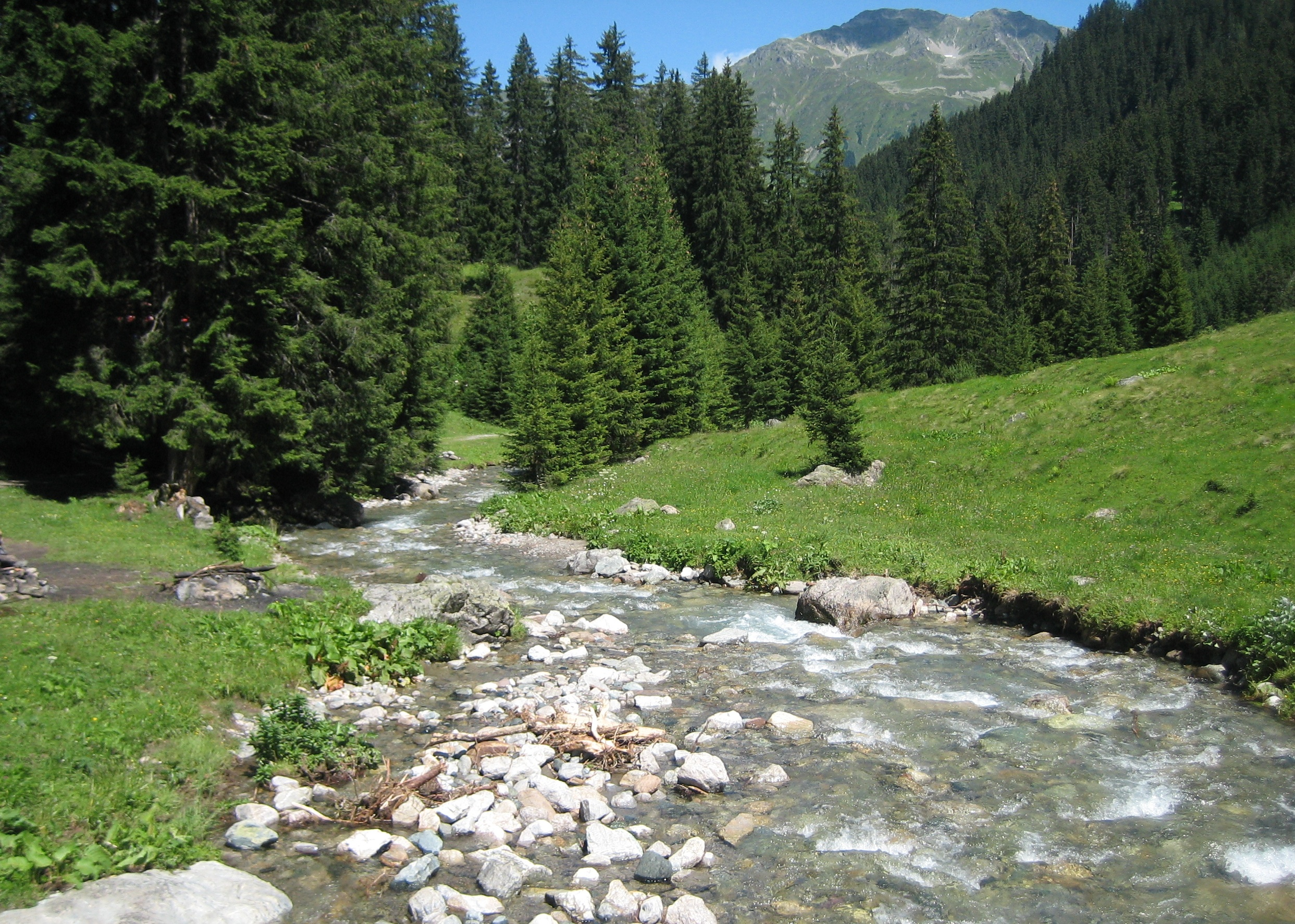
The creek Stützbach between Klosters and Davos Laret

Aerial view (1954)

Klosters-Serneus has an area, (as of 2016) of 219.8 km^{2} (84.87 sq mi). Of this area, about 24.7% is used for agricultural purposes, while 19.5% is forested. Of the rest of the land, 1.6% is settled (buildings or roads) and 54.2% is unproductive land. In the 2004/09 survey a total of 179 ha (440 acres) or about 0.8% of the total area was covered with buildings, an increase of 33 ha (82 acres) over the 1985 amount. Over the same time period, the amount of recreational space in the municipality increased by 14 ha (35 acres) and is now about 0.08% of the total area. Of the agricultural land, 4 ha (9.9 acres) is used for orchards and vineyards, 954 ha (2,360 acres) is fields and grasslands and 4,797 ha (11,850 acres) consists of alpine grazing areas. Since 1985 the amount of agricultural land has decreased by 575 ha (1,420 acres). Over the same time period the amount of forested land has increased by 315 ha (780 acres). Rivers and lakes cover 289 ha (710 acres) in the municipality.

Before 2017, the municipality was located in and is the only municipality in Klosters sub-district of the Prättigau/Davos district, after 2017 it was part of the Prättigau/Davos Region. It was created in 1865 through the merger of the formerly independent municipalities of Serneus and Klosters. Until 1973 Klosters-Serneus was known as Klosters. It is the largest and uppermost village in the Prättigau valley. It consists of the villages of Klosters and Serneus and is made up of the sections of Platz, Dorf, Selfranga, Äuja and Monbiel.

The Jöriseen, a group of Alpine lakes located west of the Jörifless Pass and north of the Flüela Wisshorn, are within the village.

== Demographics ==
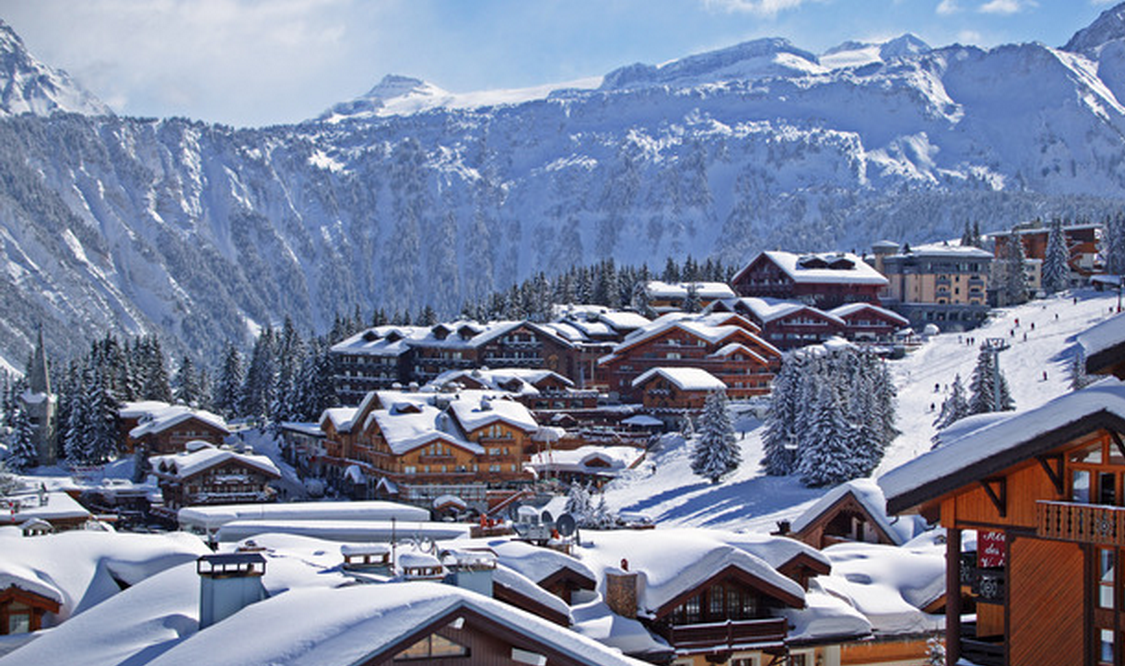
Klosters

Klosters-Serneus has a population (as of December 2020) of 4,416. As of 2015, 19.7% of the population are resident foreign nationals. In 2015 a small minority (226 or 5.9% of the population) was born in Germany and a small minority (286 or 7.5% of the population) was born in Portugal. The birth rate in the municipality, in 2015, was 7.0, while the death rate was 9.2 per thousand residents. Most of the population (as of 2000) speaks German (88.7%), with Portuguese being second most common (2.9%) and Serbo-Croatian being third (2.6%).

As of 2015, children and teenagers (0–19 years old) make up 17.7% of the population, while adults (20–64 years old) are 57.0% of the population and seniors (over 64 years old) make up 25.3%. In 2015 there were 1,508 single residents, 1,768 people who were married or in a civil partnership, 231 widows or widowers and 301 divorced residents.

In 2015, there were 2,113 private households in Klosters-Serneus with an average household size of 2.13 persons. In 2015, about 33.5% of all buildings in the municipality were single family homes, which is much less than the percentage in the canton (49.4%) and much less than the percentage nationally (57.4%). Of the 1,376 inhabited buildings in the municipality, in 2000, about 34.8% were single family homes and 43.9% were multiple family buildings. Additionally, about 20.3% of the buildings were built before 1919, while 9.0% were built between 1991 and 2000. In 2014 the rate of construction of new housing units per 1000 residents was 10.24. The vacancy rate for the municipality, in 2016, was 0.89%.

The historical population is given in the following chart:

== Skiing ==
Though the nearby linked ski resort of Davos is much larger, Klosters still features a wide variety of run types and levels (blue, red, black, and yellow) that are ideal in difficulty for intermediate to advanced skiers. The Klosters resort is also well known as a favorite of Charles III and the British Royal Family in general. The main cable car that runs to the top of Gotschnagrat, previously known since 2015 as the "Prince of Wales", was renamed "King Charles" in 2023.

== Heritage sites of national significance ==
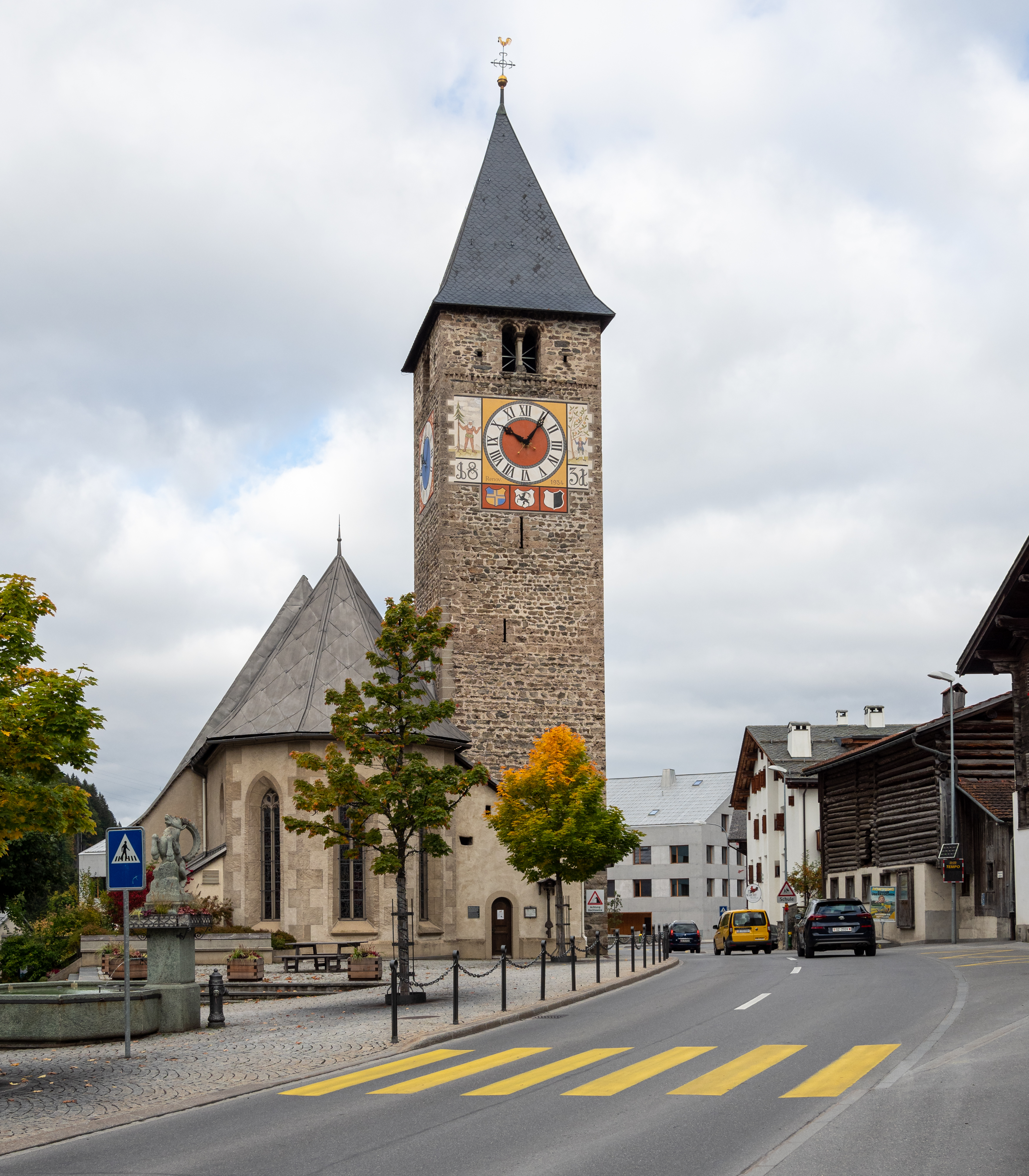
Reformed Church in Klosters-Platz

The Reformierte Kirche am Platz is listed as a Swiss heritage site of national significance.

== Politics ==
In the 2015 federal election the most popular party was the SVP with 41.3% of the vote. The next three most popular parties were the FDP (18.7%), the BDP (17.6%) and the SP (10.8%). In the federal election, a total of 1,341 votes were cast, and the voter turnout was 51.4%.

In the 2007 federal election the most popular party was the SVP which received 46.5% of the vote. The next three most popular parties were the FDP (28.7%), the SP (17.2%) and the CVP (4.7%).

== Education ==
In Klosters-Serneus about 76.4% of the population (between age 25–64) have completed either non-mandatory upper secondary education or additional higher education (either university or a Fachhochschule).

== Economy ==
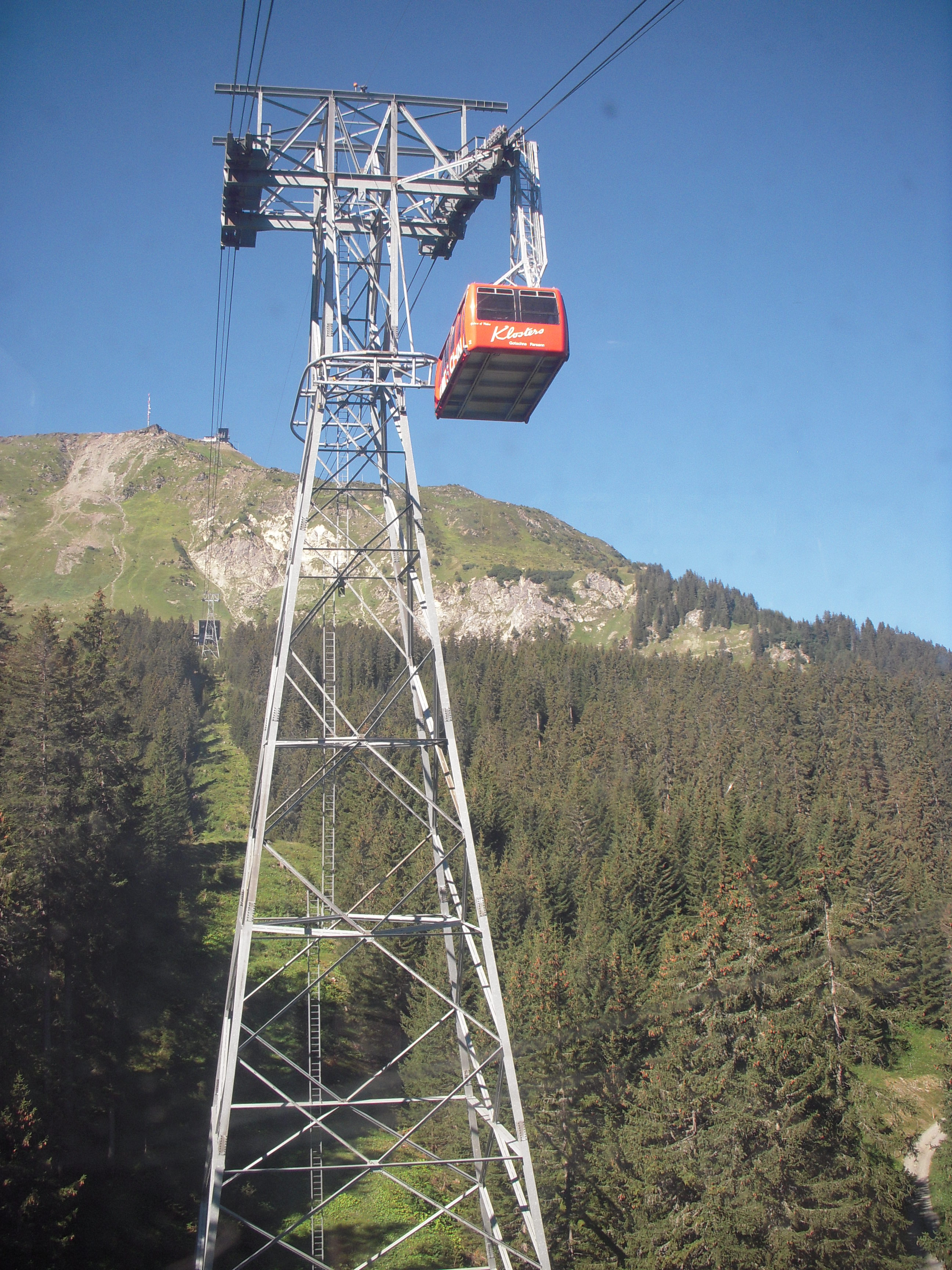
Cable car from Klosters Platz to the Gotschna summit, which is part of one of Davos' ski arena

Klosters-Serneus is classed as a tourist community. In 2015 local hotels had a total of 128,053 overnight stays, of which 54.4% were international visitors.

As of 2014, there were a total of 2,190 people employed in the municipality. Of these, a total of 144 people worked in 62 businesses in the primary economic sector. The secondary sector employed 554 workers in 83 separate businesses. There were 10 small businesses with a total of 219 employees and one mid sized business with a total of 97 employees. Finally, the tertiary sector provided 1,492 jobs in 313 businesses. There were 25 small businesses with a total of 645 employees. In 2015 a total of 10.2% of the population received social assistance.

In 2011 the unemployment rate in the municipality was 1.2%.

In 2015 the average cantonal, municipal and church tax rate in the municipality for a couple with two children making SFr 80,000 was 3.5% while the rate for a single person making SFr 150,000 was 15%, both of which are close to the average for the canton and nationally. In 2013 the average income in the municipality per tax payer was SFr 70,989 and the per person average was SFr 40,079, which is greater than the cantonal averages of SFr 69,964 and SFr 33,075 respectively In contrast, the national tax payer average is SFr 82,682, while the national per person average is SFr 35,825.

== Religion ==
From the 2000 census, 895 or 23.0% are Roman Catholic, while 2,587 or 66.5% belonged to the Swiss Reformed Church. Of the rest of the population, there are 106 individuals (or about 2.72% of the population) who belong to the Orthodox Church, and there are 13 individuals (or about 0.33% of the population) who belong to another Christian church. There are 32 (or about 0.82% of the population) who are Muslim. There are 14 individuals (or about 0.36% of the population) who belong to another church (not listed on the census), 221 (or about 5.68% of the population) belong to no church, are agnostic or atheist, and 27 individuals (or about 0.69% of the population) did not answer the question.

== Transport ==
Kloster Platz has cable car lift service to the top of Gotschnagrat at 2,281 m (7,484 ft). In winter it is part of the large ski area between Davos and Klosters.

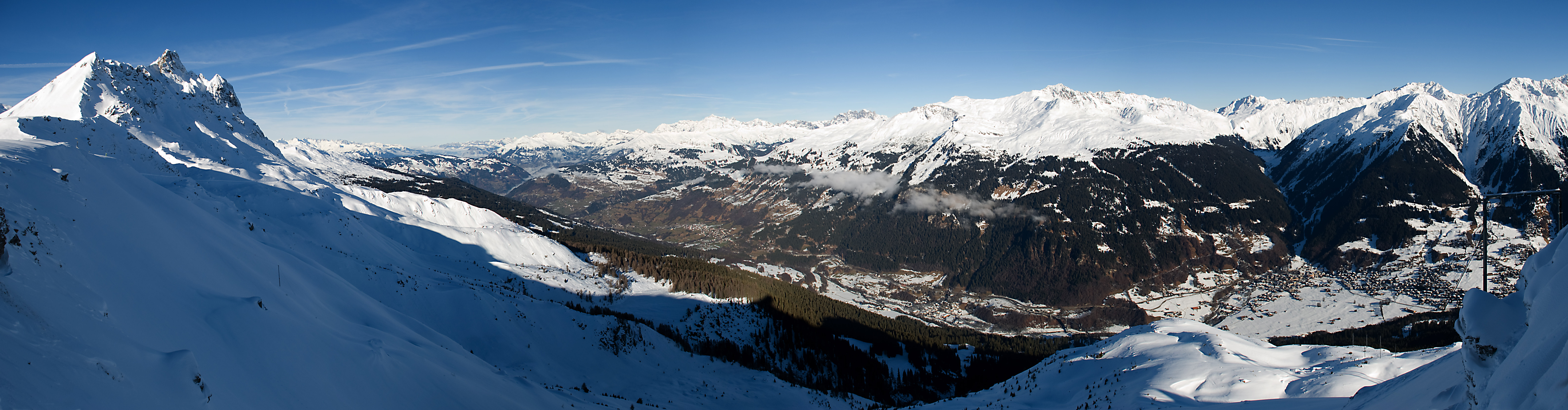
Panoramic view from Gotschnagrat: Casanna (2557m, left), Serneus (center), Madrisahorn (2826m), and Klosters Dorf (right).

Klosters lies 150 km (93 mi) southeast from Zürich, the nearest international airport. National train service is available from Zürich to Landquart, with regular regional train service to Klosters.

The municipality has four railway stations: Klosters Platz, Klosters Dorf, Cavadürli, and Saas. There is also a variety of regional and local bus services. The local Rhaetian line is the Landquart-Davos Platz line, which connects at Landquart railway station with national rail to Zürich. The portion from Landquart to Klosters was first opened in 1889. Near Serneus this local line passes the 525 m long award-winning Sunniberg Bridge, which was completed 1998 as the centerpiece of the Klosters bypass and the Lanquart valley that lies south of the railway. In 2005 the Klosters bypass, which includes both the Sunniberg Bridge and the Gotschna Tunnel, was opened for traffic in a ceremony with Prince Charles, a frequent visitor to Klosters.

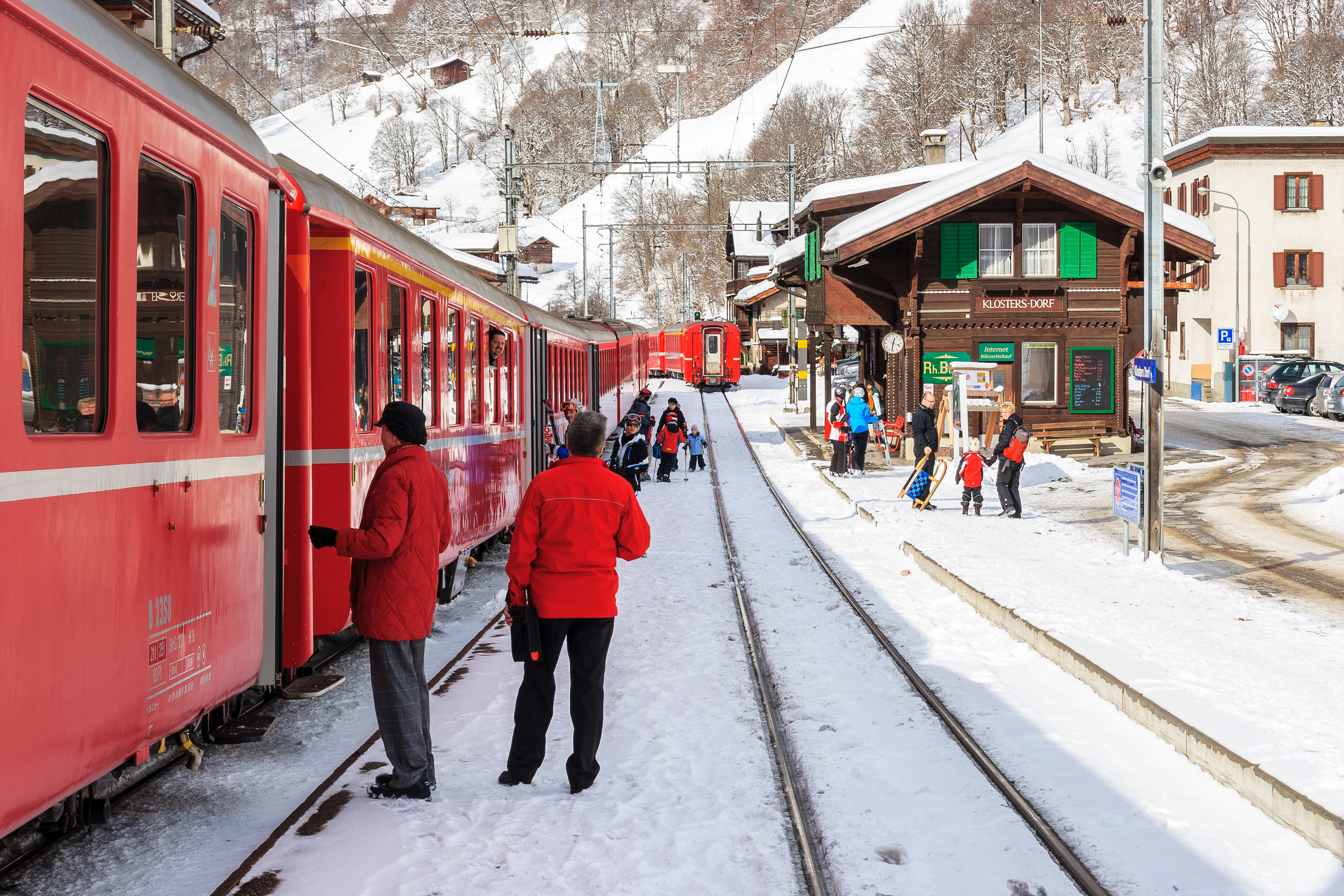
Klosters-Dorf station

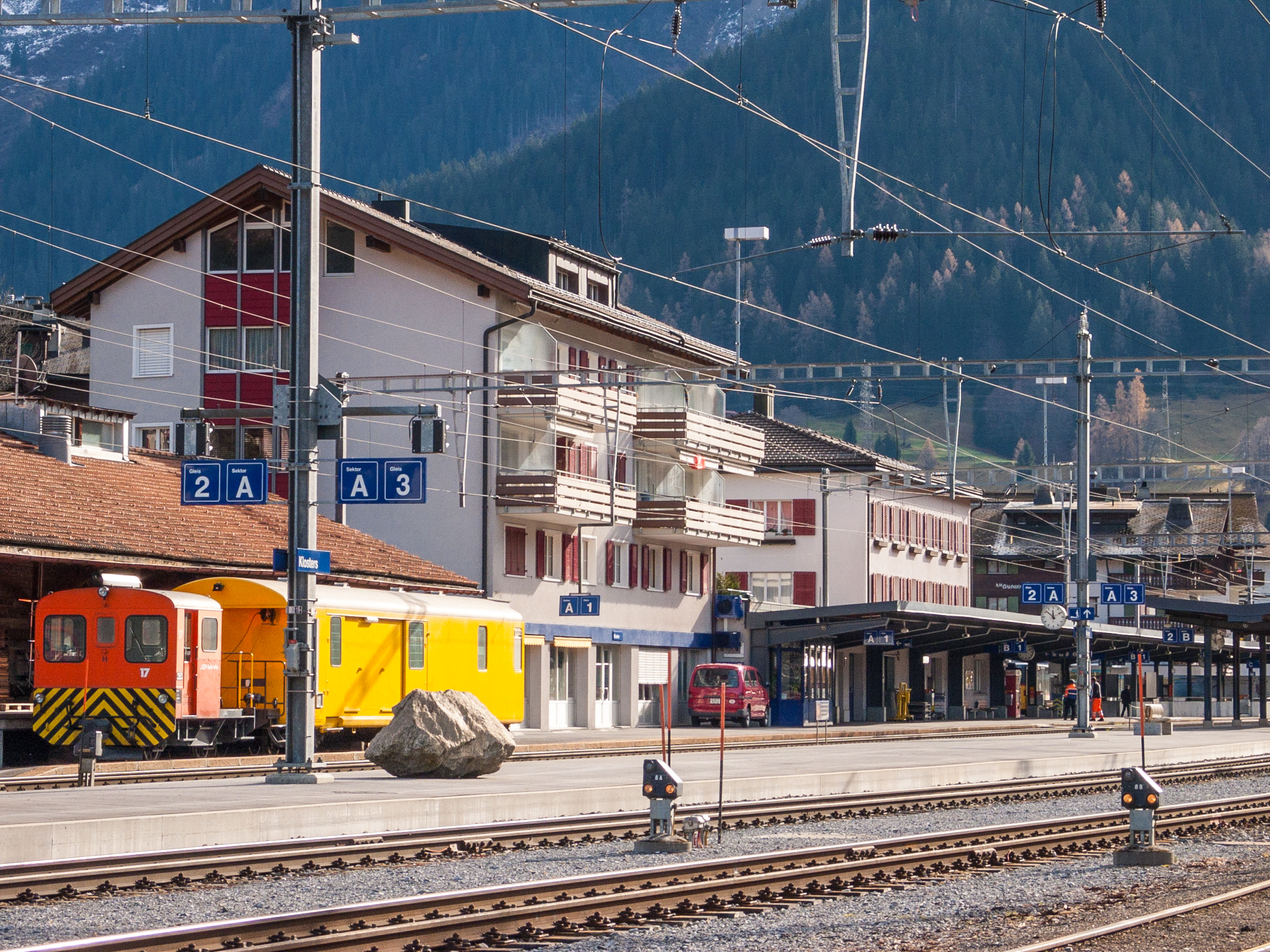
Klosters-Platz station (2006)

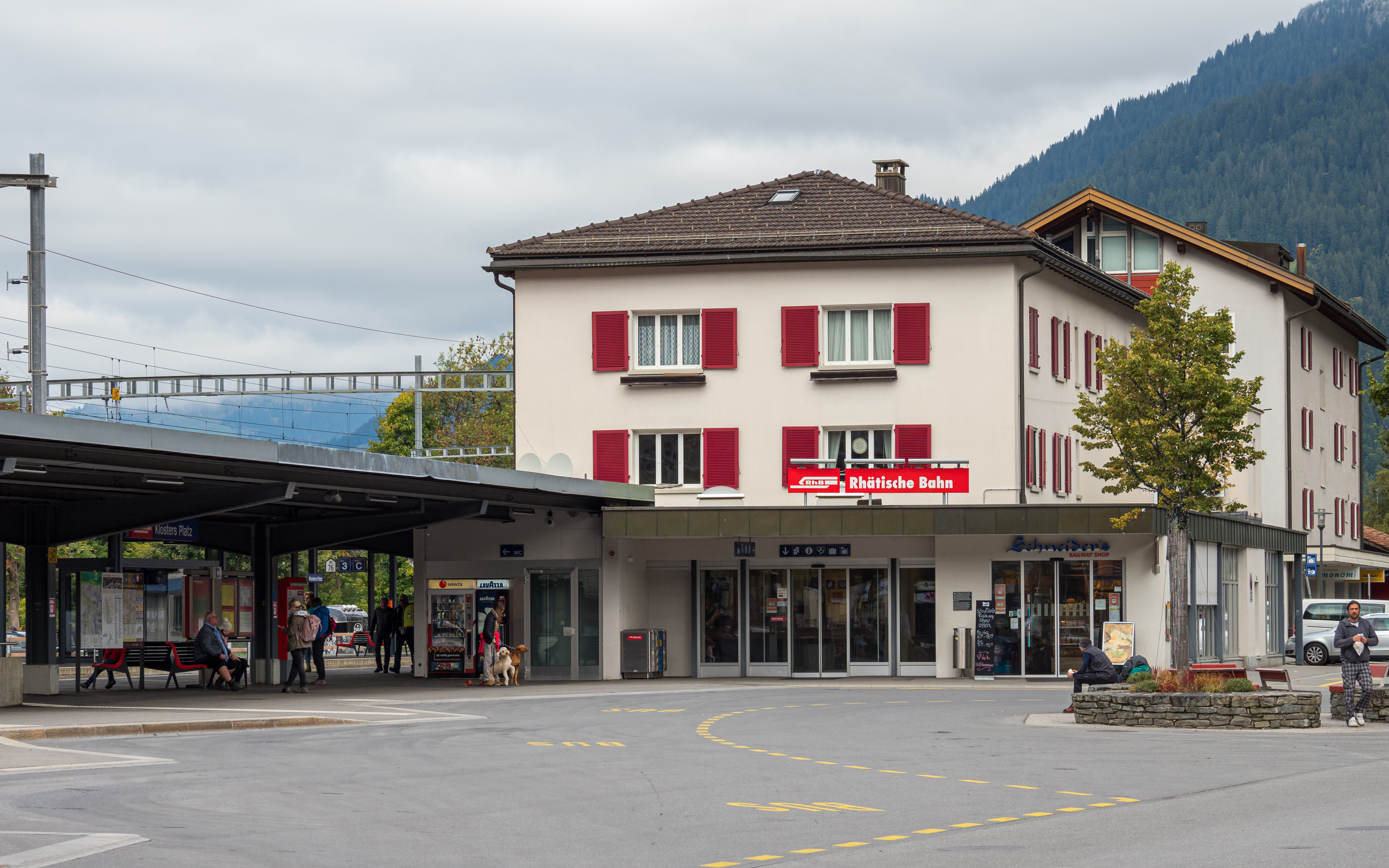
Klosters-Platz station (2021)

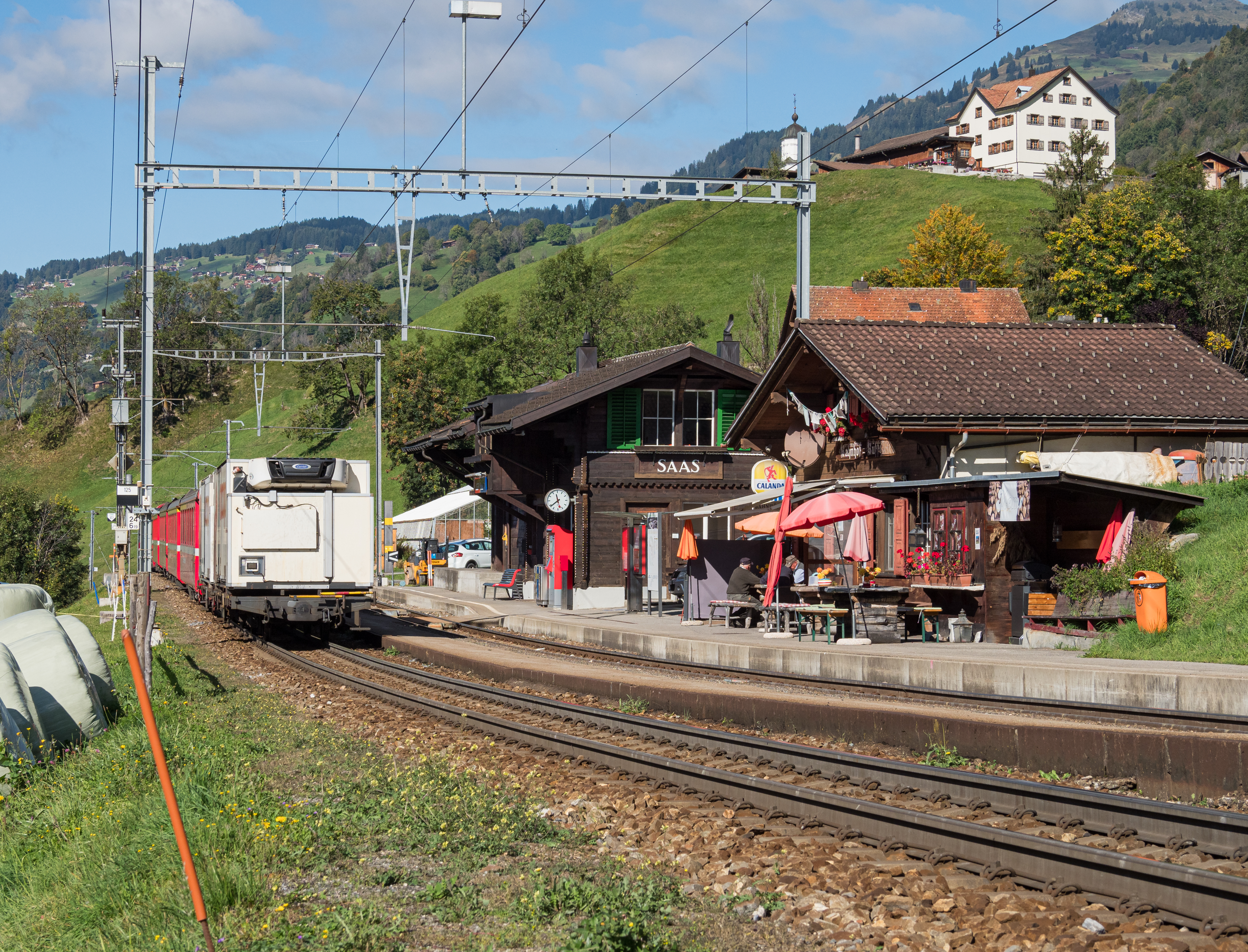
Saas station

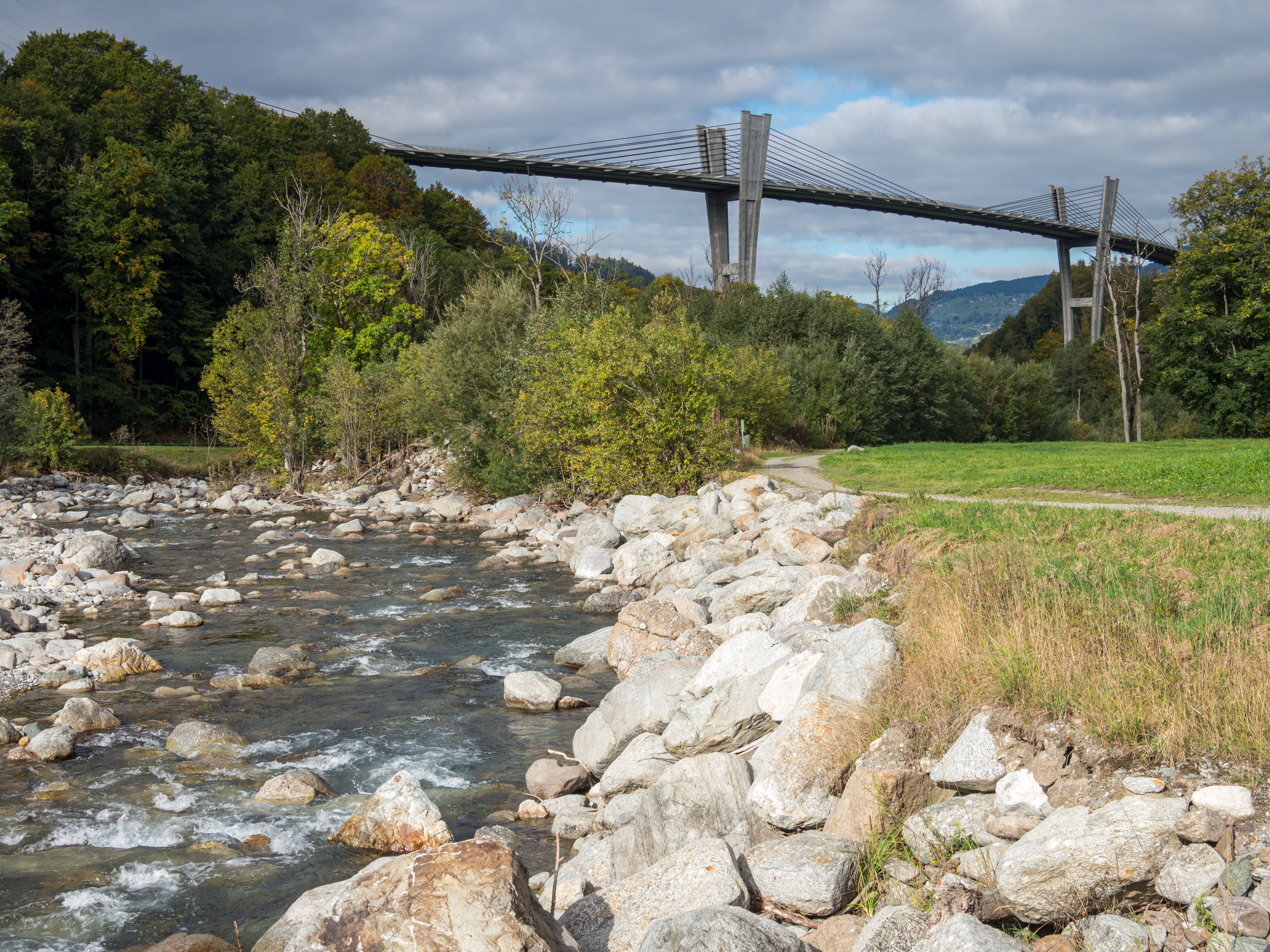
Landquart and Sunniberg bridge

== Society ==
The Klosters ski resort has been the winter destination for the British royal family, notably Prince Charles, for over three decades. Klosters takes pride in what Tom Robbins refers to as "Discreet luxury yes, pomposity just for show, no", it warns; here "understatement is written in capital letters". Prince William and Prince Harry learned to ski in the village and were often spotted at their usual haunt: Casa Antica. Other notables include Paul Newman, Gregory Peck, Yul Brynner, Lauren Bacall, Juliette Gréco, Irwin Shaw, Paul McCartney, Charles Korvin, Robert Capa, Greta Garbo and Gene Kelly, who famously danced on the tables in the hotel bar of the legendary Hotel Chesa Grischuna where Rex Harrison discussed his musical notes for "My Fair Lady" with the hotel pianist. Peter Viertel described Klosters as "Hollywood on the Rocks" in his acclaimed autobiography "Dangerous Friends" and in 1960 married Deborah Kerr in Klosters. In more recent history other regulars include Peter Mandelson, billionaires Nathaniel Rothschild, Thomas Schmidheiny, Friede Springer, Guy Spier and Peter Munk. Other notables include Tara Palmer-Tomkinson, Rupert Everett and Swiss movie producer Marc Forster. Local hotel proprietor and skier Ruth Guler ran the Hotel Wynegg, and socialised with several royals, though she treated them no differently to other guests. Nicholas Wheeler and Chrissie Rucker own the Haus Alpina chalet in Klosters.

== Climate ==
Klosters has a Tundra climate (ET) under the Köppen climate classification. The average annual temperature is 2 °C (36 °F). The average coldest month is January with an average temperature of −9 °C (15 °F), while the warmest month is July with an average temperature of 13 °C (55 °F). The wettest month is August during which time Klosters received an average of 110 millimeters (4.3 in) of rain or snow. During this month it receives precipitation for 14.6 days. The month of June has the most precipitation days, 14.9 but only has 86 millimeters (3.4 in) of precipitation. The driest month is February during which time Klosters receives an average of 36 millimeters (1.4 in) of rain or snow. During this month it receives precipitation for 10.6 days.

Climate data for Klosters
Month	Jan	Feb	Mar	Apr	May	Jun	Jul	Aug	Sep	Oct	Nov	Dec	Year
Mean daily maximum °C (°F)	−3 (27)	−1 (31)	4 (39)	8 (47)	14 (57)	18 (65)	21 (69)	19 (67)	16 (60)	10 (50)	3 (37)	−3 (27)	9 (48)
Daily mean °C (°F)	−9 (15)	−8 (18)	−3 (27)	2 (36)	7 (45)	11 (51)	13 (55)	12 (53)	9 (48)	4 (39)	−3 (27)	−8 (17)	2 (36)
Mean daily minimum °C (°F)	−16 (4)	−14 (6)	−9 (15)	−4 (25)	1 (33)	3 (38)	5 (41)	4 (40)	2 (36)	−2 (28)	−8 (18)	−13 (8)	−4 (24)
Average precipitation mm (inches)	38 (1.5)	36 (1.4)	51 (2)	56 (2.2)	71 (2.8)	86 (3.4)	100 (4.1)	110 (4.3)	89 (3.5)	81 (3.2)	66 (2.6)	51 (2)	840 (33)
Average precipitation days (≥ 1.0 mm)	11.7	10.6	12.6	12.6	14.2	14.9	14.3	14.6	10.3	8.2	10.6	11	133.9
Average rainy days (≥ 1.0mm)	4.9	4.6	6	6.3	6.9	8	8.8	9	8	7.7	6.7	6.3	83.2
Average relative humidity (%)	78	74	72	69	66	64	65	69	72	74	77	79	72

== See also ==
- Tourism in Switzerland
- klosters.com (klosters - Travel Pages)
