= Patty Bonet =

Spanish actress, journalist, and television presenter (born 1984)

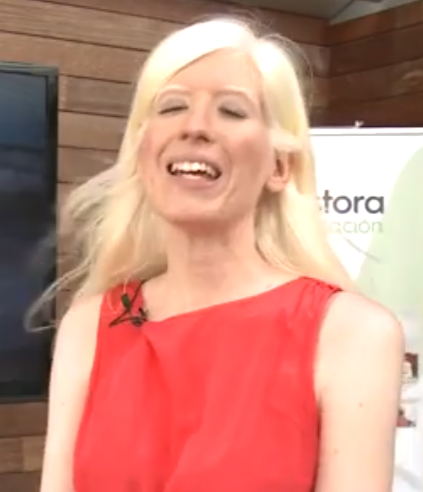
- In a short documentary she wrote and directed at CEU in 2016
- Born: November 21, 1984 (age 41); Valencia, Spain
- Education: CEU Cardenal Herrera University (Journalism)
- Occupations: Actress; journalist; television presenter
- Years active: 2015–present
- Known for: ONCE lottery presenter; Advocacy for albinism awareness
- Website: pattybonet.com

Patty Bonet (born 21 November 1984) is a Spanish actress, journalist, and television presenter. Born with albinism, she has become a prominent advocate for disability awareness and inclusion in the entertainment industry. Since September 2022, she has served as a presenter for the ONCE lottery draws broadcast on Televisión Española. Bonet has appeared in several Spanish productions, including the Netflix film The Platform 2 (2024) and the series Feria: The Darkest Light.

In 2025, she received recognition from the Government Delegation of Madrid for her work in promoting visibility of albinism and functional diversity.

== Early life and education ==
Patty Bonet was born on 21 November 1984 in Valencia, Spain. She was born with albinism, a genetic condition that affects pigmentation and vision, reducing her vision to approximately 17%. From the age of five, she has been a member of the Coral Allegro choir of ONCE (Spanish National Organization of the Blind).

Bonet graduated with a degree in Journalism from CEU Cardenal Herrera University. Despite the visual challenges associated with her condition, she pursued her career aspirations in media and entertainment.

== Career ==
=== Journalism ===
Bonet began her career in journalism, working as a radio presenter. She hosts the program "Para que veas" (So You Can See) on Radio 5 Todo Noticias, and collaborates on the film program "Cine a ciegas" (Blind Cinema) on Radio Requena COPE. She has also presented various events including the Solidarity Awards, the ONCE School Contest, the Music Biennial, and the ConONCE agencies program.

=== Television presenting ===
In September 2022, Bonet joined the team of presenters for the ONCE lottery draws, a television program broadcast on Televisión Española. Her appointment marked a significant step in representation for people with disabilities on Spanish television.

=== Acting career ===
Bonet has pursued acting alongside her journalism career. She has appeared in several Spanish productions, demonstrating her versatility as a performer.

Her film credits include God's Crooked Lines (Los renglones torcidos de Dios, 2022) and The Platform 2 (El hoyo 2, 2024), both distributed by Netflix. She also appeared in the television series Feria: The Darkest Light (Feria: la luz más oscura).

As a filmmaker, Bonet has written and directed several short films, including "De puntillas" (On Tiptoes, 2015), "¿Lo ves?" (Do You See It?, 2016), and "Breaking Myths" (2018).

=== Recent projects ===
In 2024, Bonet appeared in additional projects including "La mitad de Ana" (Half of Ana) and "Bodegón con fantasmas" (Still Life with Ghosts). She has also been involved in theater, presenting Chekhov's "The Seagull" in 2024.

== Activism and advocacy ==
Bonet is a vocal advocate for disability rights and inclusion in the entertainment industry. She works to increase visibility and understanding of albinism, challenging misconceptions about the condition. Through her media presence and public speaking, she promotes the importance of diverse representation in Spanish media.

Her advocacy work focuses on educating the public about visual disabilities and breaking down barriers for people with disabilities in professional environments.

== Personal life ==
Bonet has been open about the challenges and experiences of living with albinism. She has spoken about the importance of having role models and representation for people with disabilities in media and entertainment.

In 2024, she experienced the loss of her companion dog Pirulo, who had been with her for thirteen years and provided significant emotional support.

== Awards and recognition ==
In 2025, during International Women's Day celebrations, the Government Delegation of Madrid recognized Bonet's work in promoting visibility of albinism and functional diversity as part of the II edition of the '8M. 8 Women, 8 Reasons' awards.

== Filmography ==
=== Film ===
Year	Title	Role	Notes
2015	De puntillas		Short film (director/writer)
2016	¿Lo ves?		Short film (director/writer)
2018	Breaking Myths		Short film (director/writer)
2022	God's Crooked Lines	Disturbing woman	
2024	The Platform 2	Blonde woman	
2024	La mitad de Ana	Haberdashery shop assistant	
2024	Bodegón con fantasmas		

=== Television ===
Year	Title	Role	Notes
2022–present	ONCE Lottery Draws	Presenter	Televisión Española
