= Historic Hotels of Europe =

Coat of arms

The Historic Hotels of Europe (HHE) is an umbrella organisation established to promote like-minded independent hotel associations throughout Europe. Castles, manors, convents, palaces, monasteries, townhouses, villas and residences which have maintained their historic character are part of the HHE.

== History ==
The original concept for forming a Federation with associations representing historic hotels, castles, manors, and restaurants within Europe was initiated by the "Châteaux & Hôtels de France" (today Châteaux & Hôtels Collection) of France and the "Schlosshotels & Herrenhäuser" of Austria. The idea was to promote national cultural traditions, historic heritage, and architecture under one umbrella organisation. The Federation to advocate a more "cultural and historic" style of holiday was established in November 1997, initially consisting of eight associations in different countries.

The first formal meeting of the "European Federation of Traditional Accommodation and Historic Houses" was held in Cádiz, Spain and hosted by the "Estancias de España" in 1998. Since this first general meeting, General Assemblies are held twice a year, and the board of directors meet whenever it is necessary for the development of the Federation. The meetings take place all over Europe, and are always hosted by one of the members associations.

The Federation was renamed Historic Hotels of Europe in 2003. By 2016, its membership had been extended to include 13 associations in 18 countries. The HHE with its network encompasses almost 500 properties.

== Member organisations ==
Country	Organisation	Ref.
Austria	Schlosshotels & Herrenhäuser	
Benelux	Hampshire Hotels	
France	Symboles de France	
Greece	Yades Greek Historic Hotels	
Hungary	Hungarian Castle Hotels Association	
Ireland	Ireland's Blue Book	
Italy	Abitare la Storia	
Norway	De Historiske	
Portugal	Hotels Heritage Lisboa	
Slovakia	Historické Hotely Slovenska	
Sweden	Countryside Hotels	
Switzerland	Swiss Historic Hotels	
Wales	Welsh Rarebits	

== See also ==
- European Network for Accessible Tourism
- Historic Hotels of America
- National Trust for Historic Preservation
