= Salteras =

Coordinates: 37°25′N 6°06′W

Salteras, Spain
- city
- Flag Coat of arms
- Interactive map of Salteras, Spain
- Country: Spain
- Province: Seville
- Comarca: Comarca Metropolitana de Sevilla
- Municipality: Salteras

Area
  - Total: 57 km^{2} (22 sq mi)
- Elevation: 152 m (499 ft)

Population (2025-01-01)
  - Total: 5,604
  - Density: 98/km^{2} (250/sq mi)
- Time zone: UTC+1 (CET)
  - Summer (DST): UTC+2 (CEST)

Salteras is a city in the Province of Seville, Spain. It has a population of 5,604 inhabitants (2025 INE). It borders Olivares to the west, Gerena to the northwest, Guillena to the north, La Algaba to the northeast, Valencina to the east and Espartinas to the south. Known to the Romans as Paesula, its origins are ancient. It was historically part of the Comarca del Aljarafe, but now legally forms part of the Comarca Metropolitana de Sevilla.

== Gallery ==
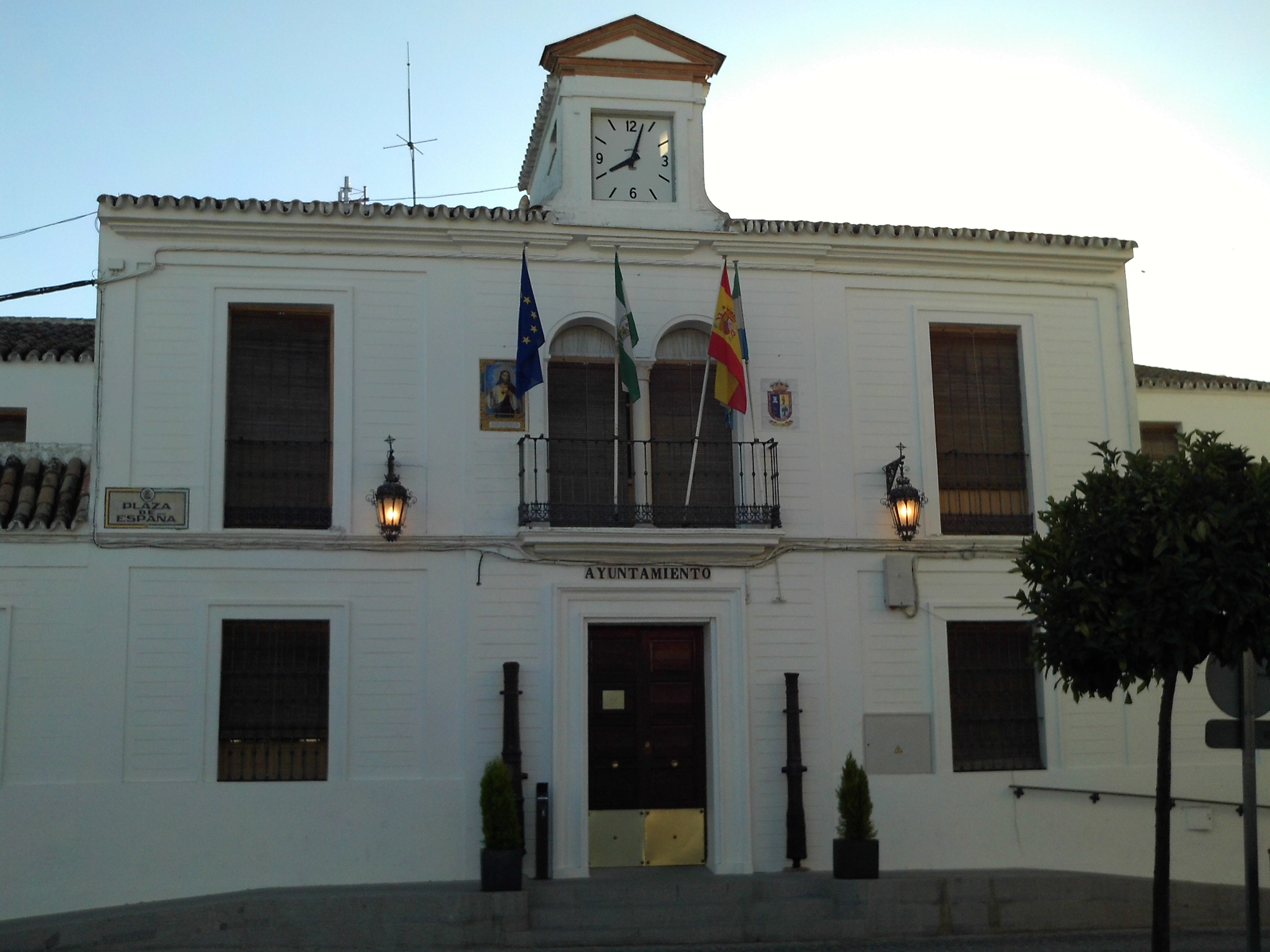
Salteras City Hall

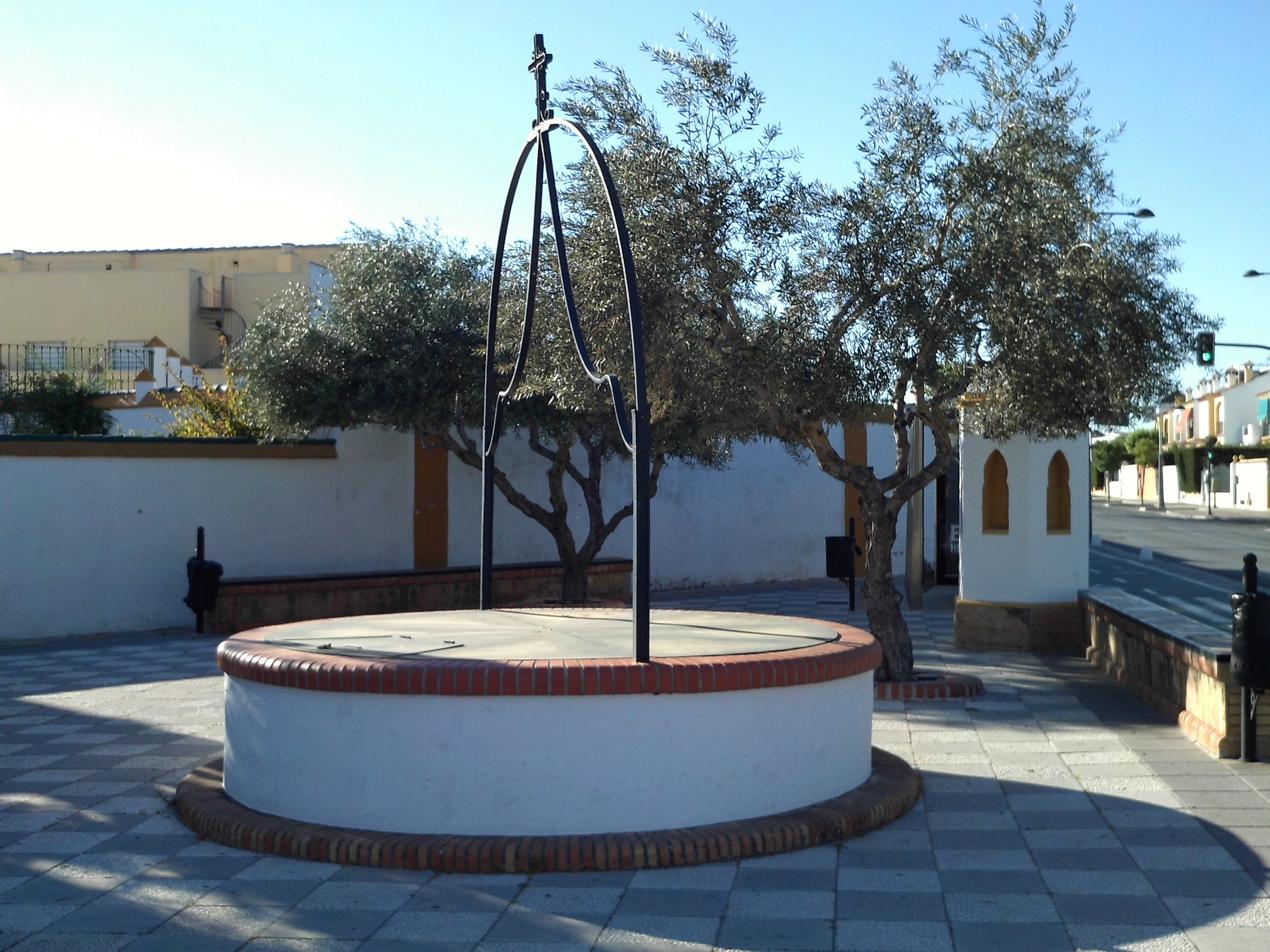
Plaza del Humilladero

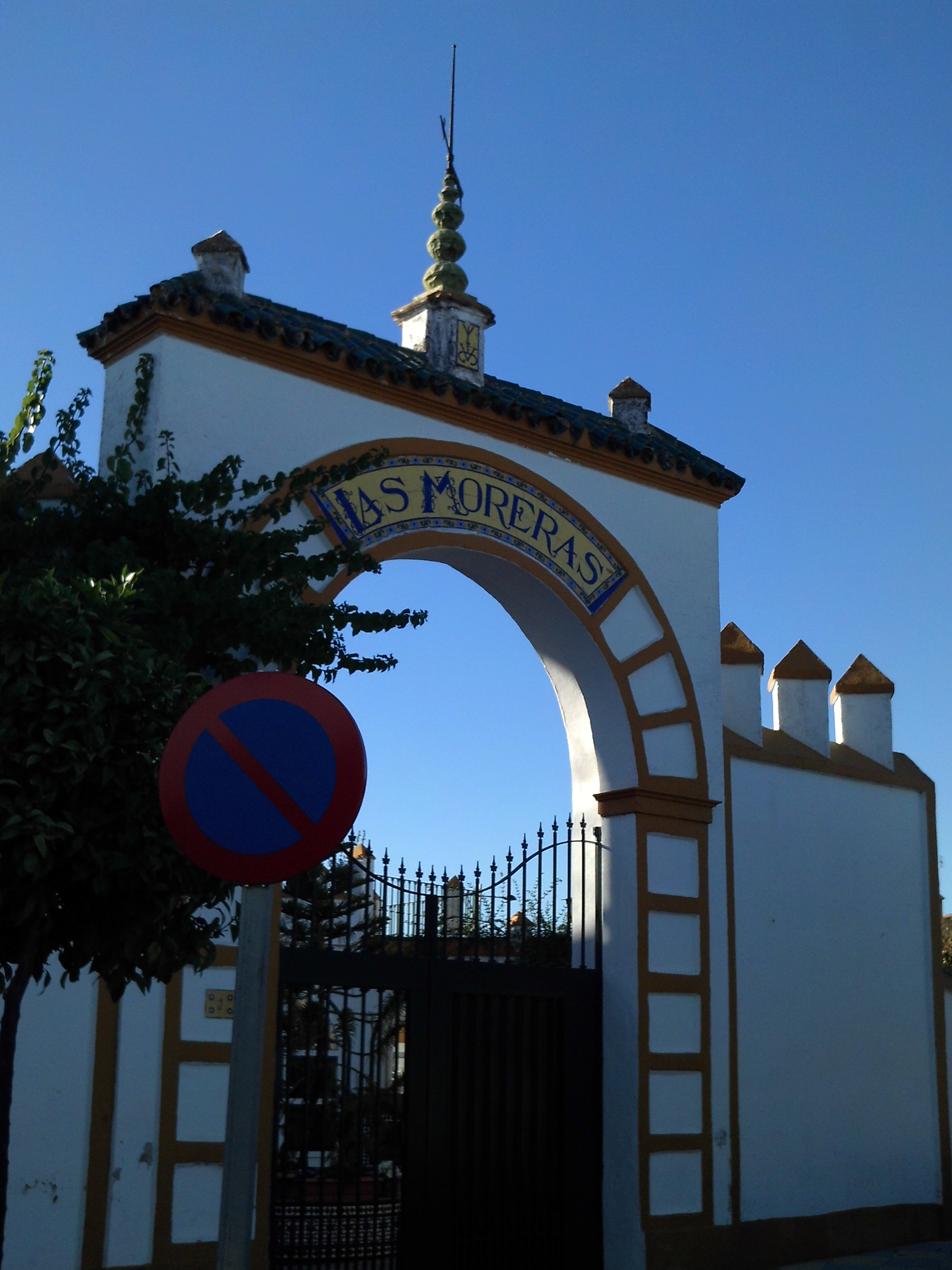
Hacienda de las Moreras

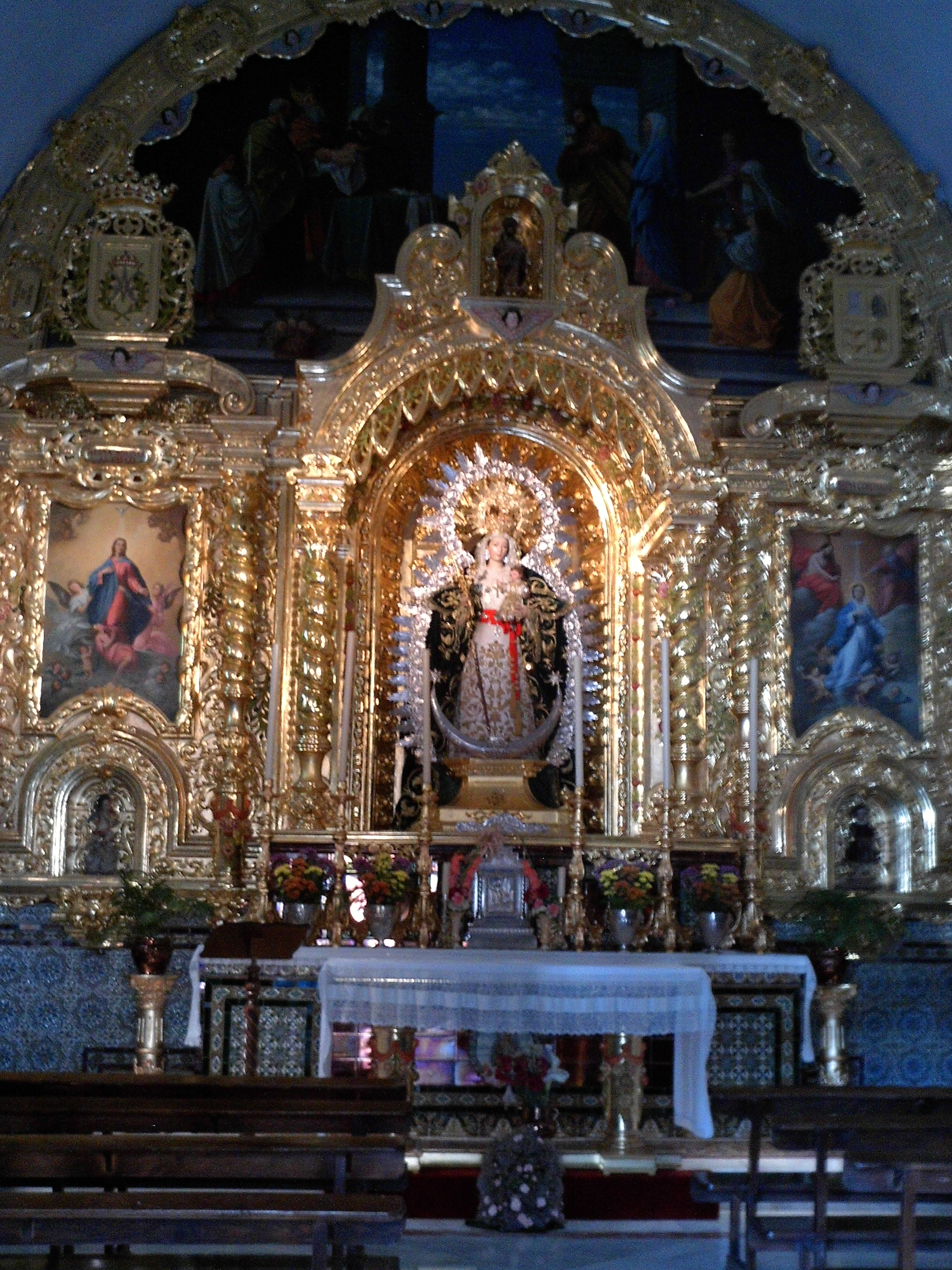
Retablo of the Virgen de la Oliva

== Landmarks and institutions ==
Amonng the historic places of Salteras are the Church of Santa María de la Oliva, the Chapel of the Virgen de la Oliva, the Hacienda El Mayorazgo, or La Alberquilla fountain Also are of interest the natural environment known as Cárcava del Chorrito and the Pickman Museum. Very known in Spain is the "Santa Ángela de la Cruz Centre", the unique residential centre specialized in deafblind people in Spain, from the Spanish Association of Families of Deafblind Persons

== See also ==
- List of municipalities in Seville
