= Spanish Association of Families of Deafblind Persons =

Spanish non-profit

Spanish Association of Families of Deafblind People (APASCIDE)
- Asociación Española de Familias de Personas con Sordoceguera
- Abbreviation: APASCIDE
- Founded: 1991
- Type: Non-profit organization
- Headquarters: Madrid, Spain
- Region served: Spain
- Key people: Dolores Romero
- Website: apascide.org

The Spanish Association of Families of Deafblind People (APASCIDE, from the Spanish Asociación Española de Familias de Personas con Sordoceguera) is a Spanish non-profit organization founded in 1991. Its purpose is to promote the welfare, education, and inclusion of people with deafblindness and to support their families throughout Spain.

APASCIDE develops social, educational, and residential programs and provides professional training in deafblind communication and care. The association has been recognized by the Fundaciónn Lealtad for transparency and good governance practices.

== History ==
During the 1990s and early 2000s, professionals of the Organización Nacional de Ciegos Españoles helped APASCIDE to consolidate a national framework of support for deafblind people and their families. In 2006 the association was declared of public utility by the Spanish Ministry of the Interior, and it later collaborated with the Fundación Once para la Atención de Personas con Sordoceguera, the IMSERSO (Institute for Older Persons and Social Services), and several regional governments.

=== Centro Santa Ángela de la Cruz ===
APASCIDE’s most significant resource is the Centro Santa Ángela de la Cruz, located in Salteras, near Seville. Opened in 2010, it was the first residential and educational facility in Spain fully dedicated to people with deafblindness requiring intensive support. The center provides permanent housing, education, and occupational workshops based on a person-centred approach.

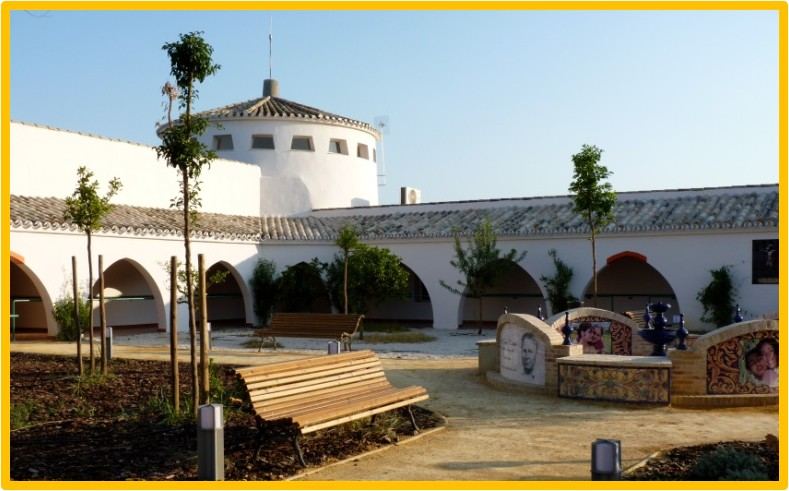

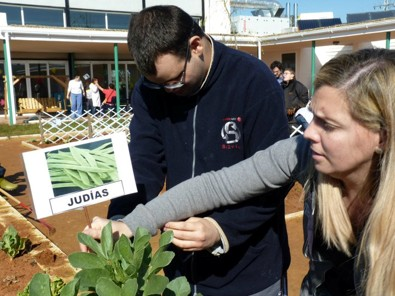

== International cooperation ==
APASCIDE takes part in European cooperation projects under Erasmus+, facilitating exchange and training of professionals in the field of deafblindness. In 2025, staff from institutions in the Netherlands and Republica Dominicana carried out exchanges with the Salteras center. APASCIDE is a member of Deafblind International.

== Recognition ==
APASCIDE has received various acknowledgments for its social contribution. It obtained the quality seal of the Fundaciónn Lealtad for meeting the nine principles of transparency and good practices. The association and its programs are cited in Spanish academic and professional literature concerning deafblindness.

== Social impact ==
According to institutional data, APASCIDE’s initiatives reach several hundred deafblind persons and their relatives each year. The organization has contributed to the recognition of deafblindness in Spanish disability legislation and in dependency-care policies. National and regional media such as El País, ABC Sevilla, Europa Press, and Canal Sur have reported on its activities, highlighting its role in promoting the rights and inclusion of deafblind people

== See also ==
- Deafblindness
- Organización Nacional de Ciegos Españoles
- Salteras
- Disability in Spain
