= Casanna =

Mountain in Switzerland

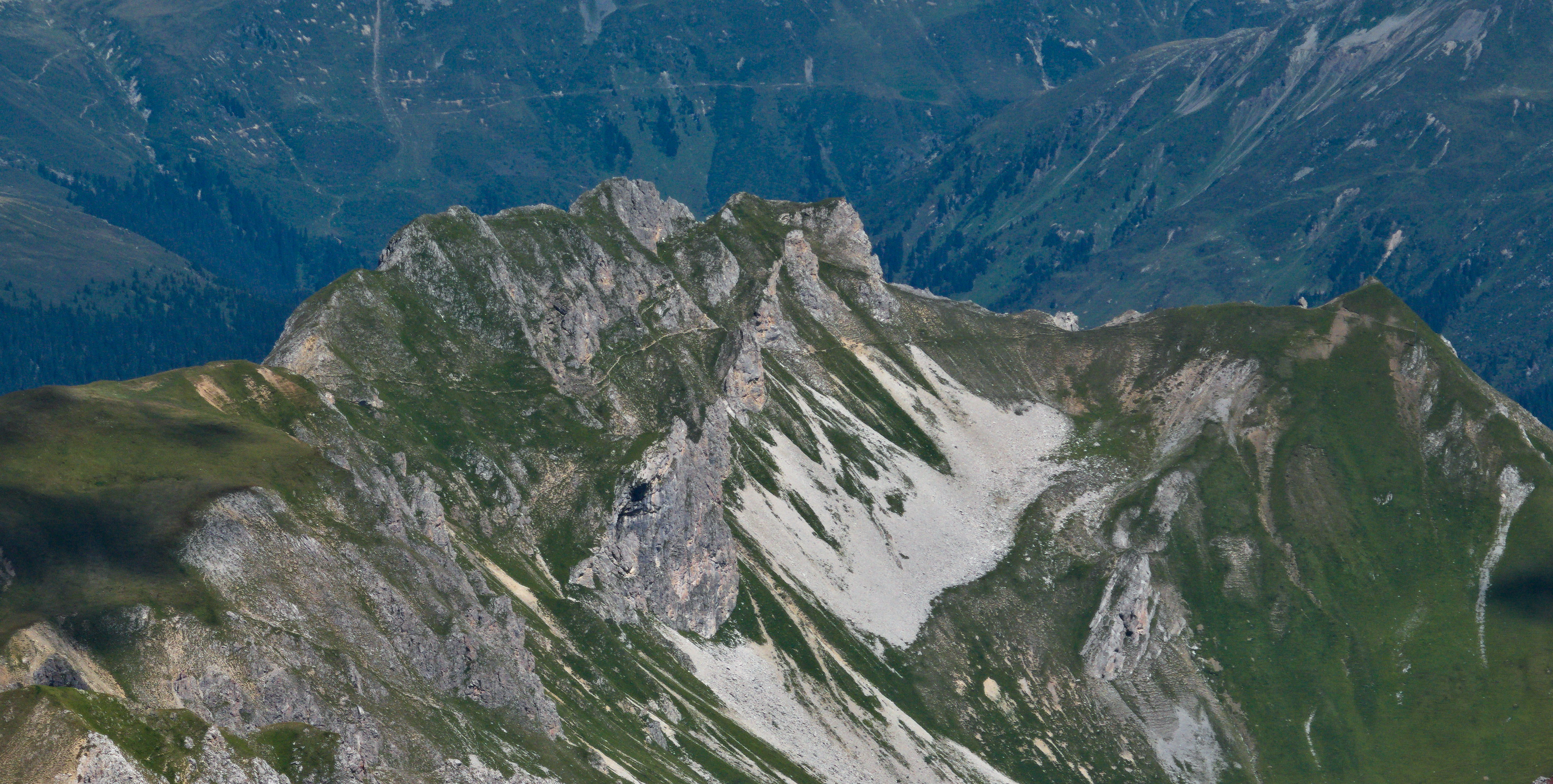

Highest point
- Elevation: 2,557 m (8,389 ft)
- Prominence: 122 m (400 ft)
- Parent peak: Weissfluh
- Coordinates: 46°51′32.6″N 9°49′34.6″E

Geography
- Location within Switzerland
- Location: Graubünden, Switzerland
- Parent range: Plessur Alps

The Casanna is a mountain of the Plessur Alps, overlooking Serneus and Klosters in the canton of Graubünden. It lies west of the Gotschnagrat, where a cable car station is located.

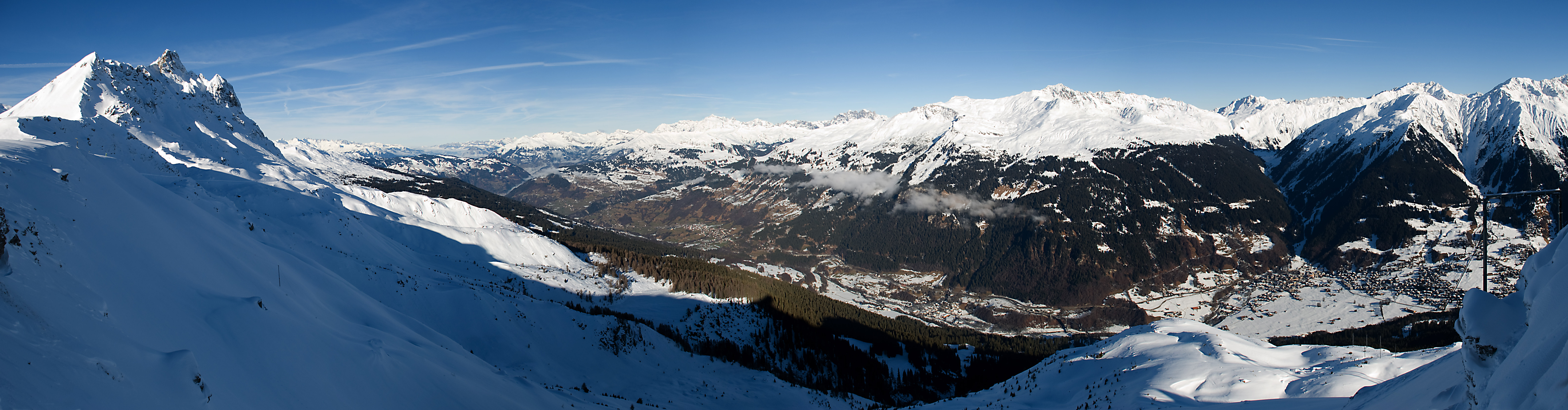
Panoramic view from Gotschnagrat: Casanna (2557m, left), Serneus (center), Madrisahorn (2826m), and Klosters Dorf (right).
