= Gotschnagrat =

Mountain in Switzerland

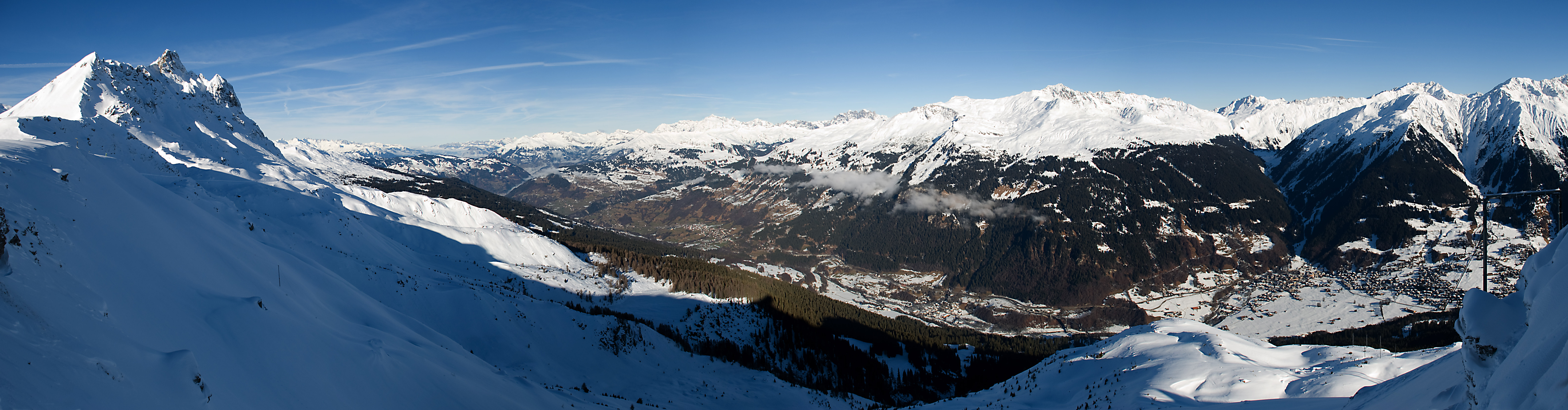
- View from the Gotschnagrat with the Casanna on the left

Highest point
- Elevation: 2,297 m (7,536 ft)
- Prominence: 19 m (62 ft)
- Parent peak: Aroser Rothorn
- Coordinates: 46°51′30″N 9°50′47″E

Geography
- Location within Switzerland
- Location: Graubünden, Switzerland
- Parent range: Plessur Alps

Climbing
- Easiest route: Aerial tramway

The Gotschnagrat is a mountain of the Plessur Alps, overlooking Klosters in the canton of Graubünden, Switzerland. It is a minor prominence on the ridge descending east of the Casanna.

The Gotschnagrat can be reached by cable car from Klosters. In winter it is part of the large ski area between Davos and Klosters. According to the latest Swisstopo maps, the peak is 2,297 m (7,536 ft) high. It has a minor prominence of only 19 m (62 ft).

== See also ==
- List of mountains of Switzerland accessible by public transport
