= Ruth Guler =

Swiss skier and hotelier

Ruth Guler

Ruth Guler (8 November 1930 – 10 February 2015) was a Swiss skier and hotelier, who ran the Hotel Wynegg in the skiing resort of Klosters, Switzerland. Her hotel was regularly visited by members of the British royal family.

== Biography ==
Guler was born and grew up in Klosters, and her parents owned the Wynegg. She learned English at a British language school and found work as an au pair before inheriting management of the hotel after her father's death. She was the only female member at the local ski school in the early 1950s and regularly participated with secret upper-class events, and enjoyed watching the racing at Royal Ascot. She was friends with royalty; particularly Prince Charles and Princess Diana who enjoyed staying at the Wynegg, and taught Charles how to ski.

Guler was known for her no-nonsense approach to hotel management. The playwright Robert L. Joseph described her as "diva-like". She kept basic facilities at the Wynegg and ensured a rigid discipline. Guests arriving with snow on their boots would be reprimanded and told to brush it off outside. On several occasions, she threw drunk guests out into the street, and on another, she refused to give a newlywed couple a double bed, saying "You are not here to sleep; you are here to ski". Journalist and socialite Tara Palmer-Tomkinson said Guler ran the hotel like a boarding school, throwing guests out of bed at 8am and saying "Come on, get up!" Though royalty stayed at the Wynegg regularly, she treated them no different from any other guest, saying that "otherwise, they'd tear the place down". She loved the British sense of humour, particularly its eccentricity, and despite her stern demands she was popular with regular guests including the royals.

In 2013, due to ill health, Guler retired from managing the Wynegg, leaving the running to three locals, a popular choice in Klosters. She died on 10 February 2015, having never married and without children.
