= European Network for Accessible Tourism =

The European Network for Accessible Tourism (ENAT) is a non-profit association of tourism enterprises, organisations and individuals from the private, public and NGO sectors aimed at evaluating good practices, as well as providing and endorsing services and products for accessible tourism in Europe. ENAT was first set up as a project activity in 2006, within the framework of the EC Disability Action Plan and was originally composed of nine founding members (partners), including VisitBritain and the ONCE Foundation, from six European countries.

Although the organization has Europe as its primary concern for accessible tourism, it also welcomes members from other countries and continents. As of 2012, the organisation includes almost 200 registered members from 28 countries, representing over 150 national, European and global organisations.

The first ENAT International Tourism for All Congress was held in Valencia, Spain in November 2007. The second international Congress took place in Vienna, Austria from September 30 to October 1, 2009.

The United Nations World Tourism Organization (UNWTO) took up Honorary Associate Membership, with Observer status in June 2008.

ENAT is registered in the European Commission's Transparency Register.

== See also ==
- Accessibility
- Accessible Tourism
