= Brusio spiral viaduct =

Railway viaduct

Brusio spiral viaduct Viadotto elicoidale di Brusio
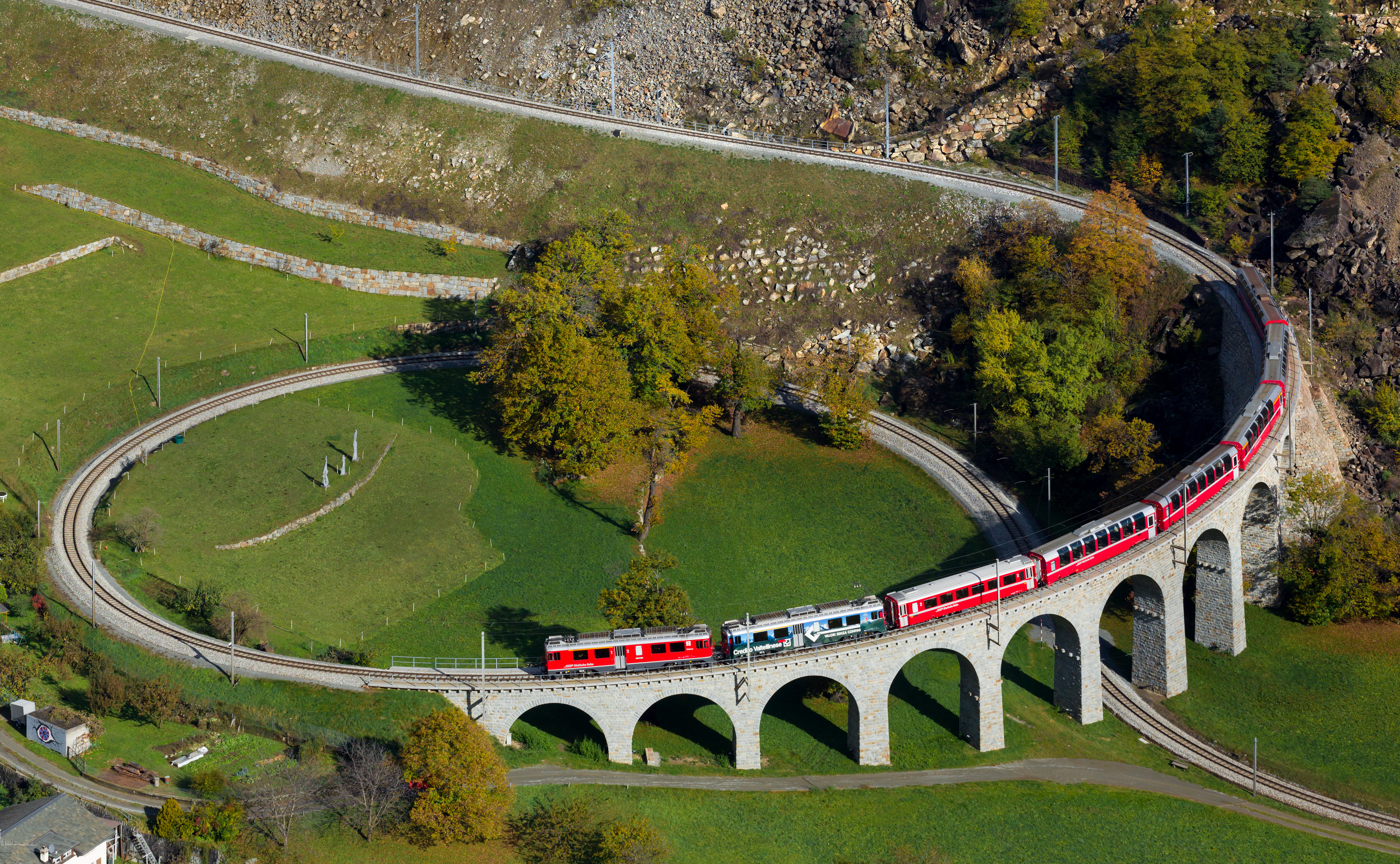
- The Bernina Express on the viaduct
- Coordinates: 46°15′14″N 10°07′40″E
- Carries: Rhaetian Railway
- Locale: Brusio, Switzerland
- Official name: Viadotto elicoidale di Brusio
- Other name: Kreisviadukt Brusio
- Owner: Rhaetian Railway
- Maintained by: Rhaetian Railway

Characteristics
- Design: Spiral arch bridge, viaduct
- Material: Stone
- Total length: 110 m (360 ft)
- No. of spans: 9, each of 10 m (33 ft)

History
- Opened: 1 July 1908

Location
- Interactive map of Brusio spiral viaduct

The Brusio spiral viaduct (or Brusio circular viaduct; Italian: Viadotto elicoidale di Brusio, German: Kreisviadukt Brusio) is a single-track nine-arched stone spiral railway viaduct on the Bernina Railway. It was opened on 1 July 1908.

A key structure of the World Heritage Site-listed Bernina Railway, it is located near Brusio, in the Canton of Graubünden, Switzerland, and was built to limit the railway's gradient at that location within its specified maximum of 7%. It is considered to be one of the architectural highlights of the Rhaetian Railway.

== Location ==
The Brusio spiral viaduct forms part of the Bernina Railway section between Brusio and Campascio railway stations. It is just south of Brusio, and approximately 54 kilometres (34 mi) from St. Moritz railway station.

== History ==
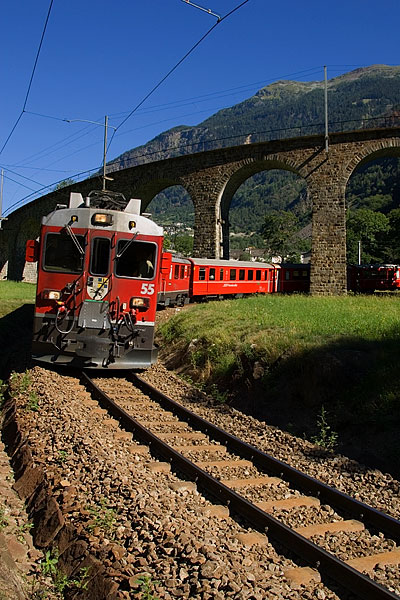
Train passing below the viaduct

During the construction of the Bernina Railway, its engineers decided that its route and features ought to follow and adapt to the natural landscape to the maximum extent, avoiding unnecessary complexity wherever possible. They also decided to avoid the construction of a rack-and-pinion railway due to a desire for the line to be suitable for both passenger and freight traffic; the adoption of a rack system would have made it impossible to run heavy trains, effectively preventing the line's use by freight trains. It was also desirable for the line to serve valley locations, and thus for the route to vary in height above the valley floor. It was such decisions that drove the construction of the Brusio spiral viaduct.

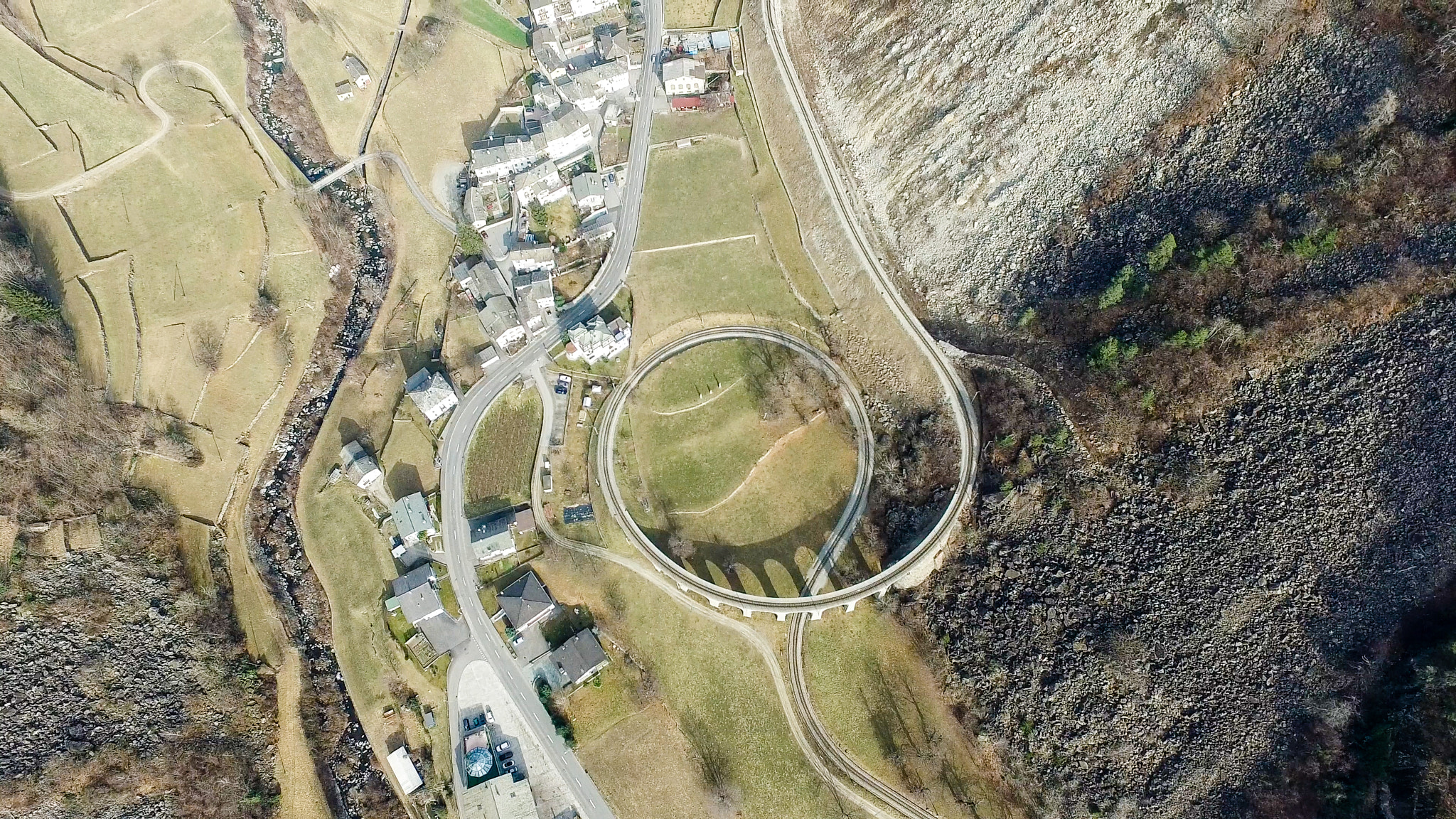
Spiral viaduct and railway from above

A spiral viaduct was required immediately south of Brusio to limit the railway's grade to the required maximum of 7%, so that the train would not slip on the way up, or be uncontrollable on the way down. The construction of a viaduct on this site had not been originally planned for; instead, a spiral tunnel was at one point intended to be constructed; however, local geological factors discouraged the boring of such a tunnel. Therefore, the line's engineers decided to construct a 360 degree curve with a 50 to 70 m (160 to 230 ft) radius, rising up from the valley floor, the viaduct forms a part of that curve.

The spiral viaduct is 110 metres (360 ft) long, has a horizontal radius of curvature of 70 metres (230 ft), a longitudinal slope of 7 percent, and is made up of nine spans, each 10 metres (33 ft) in length. The spiral configuration maximises the rate of elevation in comparison to a conventional curve, while also avoiding the inconveniences of a switchback alternative. Wherever reasonable, local materials were sourced for its construction.

On 1 July 1908, the viaduct was opened in conjunction with the opening of the Tirano–Poschiavo section of the Bernina Railway. In 1943, the whole of the Bernina Railway was taken over by the Rhaetian Railway; this company continues to both own and operate services across the spiral viaduct to the present day. The services the spiral viaduct carries facilitate not only local trade purposes but tourism as well. Since 2008, the spiral viaduct, along with the rest of the route, has been recognised as a UNESCO World Heritage Site.

== See also ==
- Arch bridge
- Spiral (railway)
- Track transition curve
- Bernina Express
- Rhaetian Railway
