= Celerina (disambiguation) =

Celerina may refer to the following places and jurisdictions :

- Celerina/Schlarigna, a municipality in the district of Maloja in the canton of Graubünden, Switzerland
  - Celerina (Rhaetian Railway station), its railway station on the Albula railway line
  - Celerina Staz (Rhaetian Railway station), its railway station on the Bernina railway line
- Celerina (see), a former Ancient city and bishopric in Numidia, now a Latin Catholic titular in modern Algeria
- Celerina seyrigii, a species of flowering plant in the monotypic genus Celerina (plant)
