= Brusio =

- Municipality
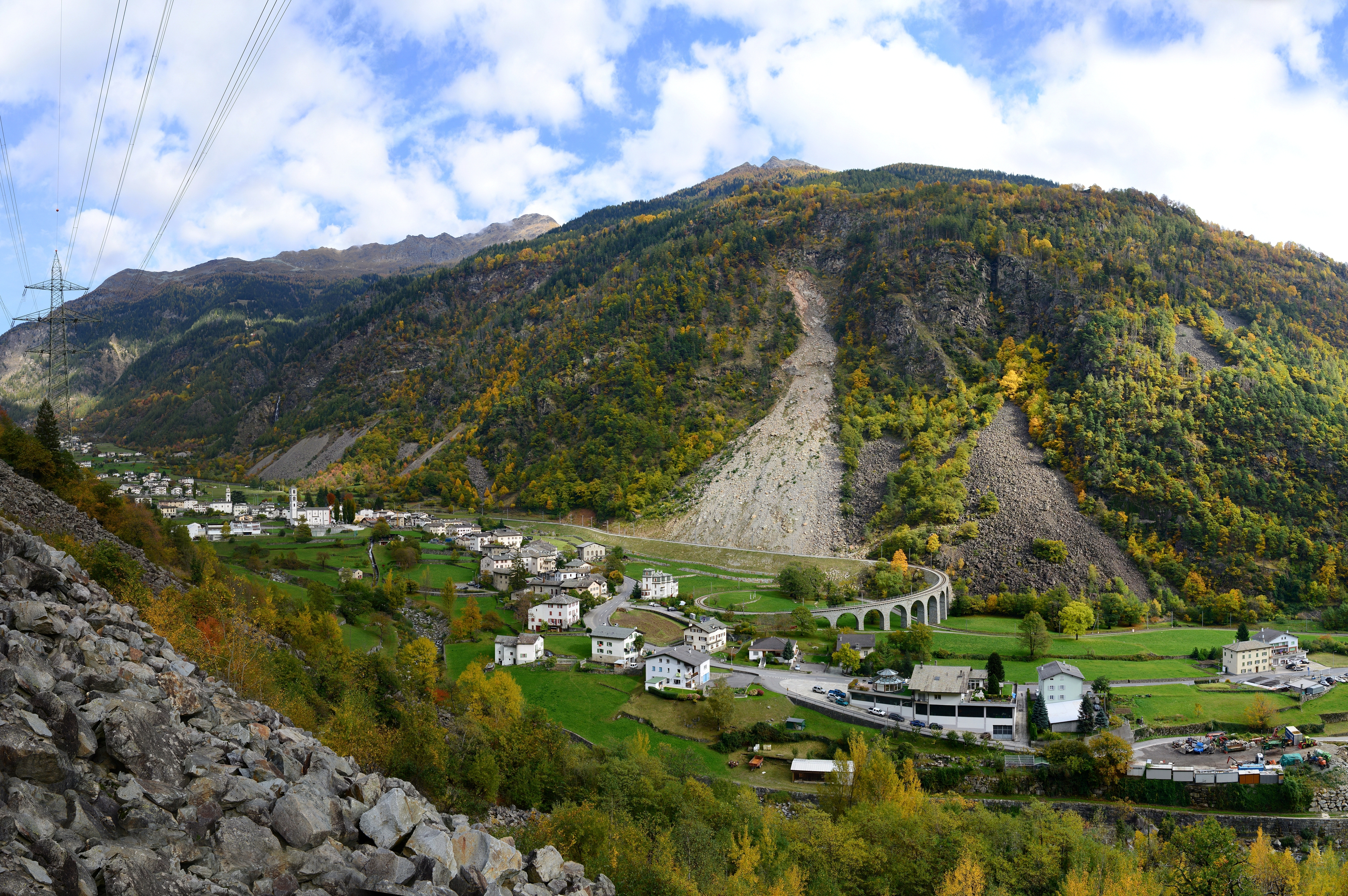

- Flag Coat of arms
- Location of Brusio
- Location within Switzerland Location within Canton of Grisons
- Coordinates: 46°15′N 10°8′E
- Country: Switzerland
- Canton: Grisons
- District: Bernina

Area
  - Total: 46.29 km^{2} (17.87 sq mi)
- Elevation: 780 m (2,560 ft)

Population (December 2015)
  - Total: 1,106
  - Density: 23.89/km^{2} (61.88/sq mi)
- Time zone: UTC+01:00 (CET)
  - Summer (DST): UTC+02:00 (CEST)
- Postal code: 7743
- SFOS number: 3551
- ISO 3166 code: CH-GR
- Localities: Viano, Cavaione, Campocologno, Campascio, Miralago, Zalende
- Surrounded by: Bianzone (IT-SO), Chiuro (IT-SO), Grosotto (IT-SO), Poschiavo, Teglio (IT-SO), Tirano (IT-SO), Vervio (IT-SO), Villa di Tirano (IT-SO)
- Website: www.brusio.ch

Brusio (Lombard: Brus; Romansh: Brüsch) is a municipality in the Bernina Region in the canton of Grisons in Switzerland.

== History ==
Brusio is first mentioned in 1106 as Bruse. It was first mentioned as Brusio in 1212. Previously it was known as Romansh: Brüsch and German: Brüs.

The monastery of San Romerio (earlier, San Remigio) was founded above the Val Poschiavo before 1055. Soon thereafter the village of Brusio was settled on the valley floor below the monastery. The monastery influenced this early stage of settlement and growth in the village. By 1212 it was an independent municipality with its own dean or senior pastor who represented the municipality's interests. In the 13th century, the entire Val Poschiavo became part of the fief of the Bishop of Chur. During the 14th century, Brusio was part of the practically (although not officially) independent municipality of Poschiavo. Around 1498, Poschiavo (with Brusio) joined the League of God's House and by extension, the Three Leagues. During the conquest of the Valtellina valley by the Three Leagues, the hamlets of Campocologno (1518) and Zalende (1526) were founded. In 1610 Brusio tried to leave the municipality of Poschiavo, but it wasn't until 1851 that they were successful. In 1863 the previously Italian side valley of Saiento and the hamlet of Cavajone joined Brusio and became Swiss.

== Geography ==
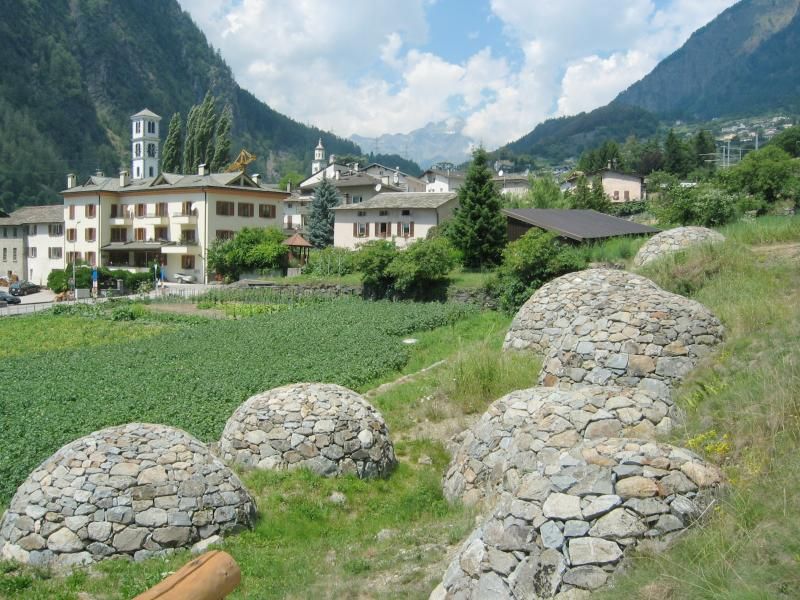
Brusio village

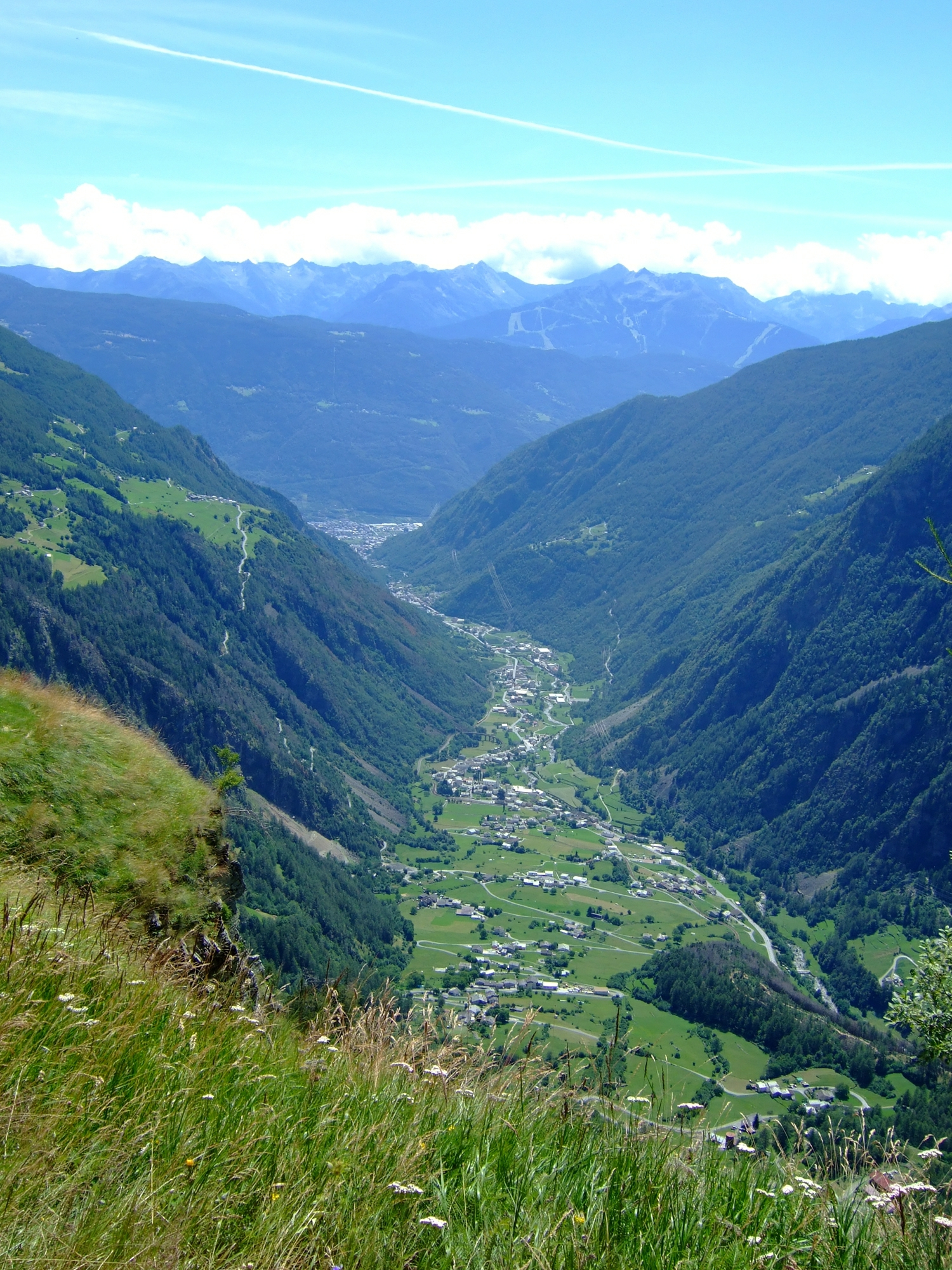
Brusio from San Romerio

Aerial view (1954)

Brusio has an area, as of 2006, of 46.3 km^{2} (17.9 sq mi). Of this area, 16.6% is used for agricultural purposes, while 54.1% is forested. Of the rest of the land, 2.3% is settled (buildings or roads) and the remainder (27%) is non-productive (rivers, glaciers or mountains).

The municipality is located in the Brusio sub-district of the Bernina district. It is located in the Val Poschiavo on the road from the Bernina Pass into Italy. Besides the village of Brusio itself, it consists of the hamlets of Campocologno, Zalende, Campascio, Piazzo and parts of Miralago as well as the small settlements of Viano and Cavaione high in the mountains.

== Demographics ==
Brusio has a population (as of 31 December 2020) of 1,120. As of 2008, 7.6% of the population was made up of foreign nationals. Over the last 10 years the population has decreased at a rate of 12.7%.

As of 2000, the gender distribution of the population was 48.7% male and 51.3% female. The age distribution, as of 2000, in Brusio is; 116 people or 9.7% of the population are between 0 and 9 years old. 71 people or 5.9% are 10 to 14, and 44 people or 3.7% are 15 to 19. Of the adult population, 117 people or 9.7% of the population are between 20 and 29 years old. 193 people or 16.1% are 30 to 39, 142 people or 11.8% are 40 to 49, and 181 people or 15.1% are 50 to 59. The senior population distribution is 146 people or 12.1% of the population are between 60 and 69 years old, 128 people or 10.6% are 70 to 79, there are 56 people or 4.7% who are 80 to 89, and there are 8 people or 0.7% who are 90 to 99.

In the 2007 federal election the most popular party was the SVP which received 40.8% of the vote. The next three most popular parties were the SPS (21.8%), the CVP (20.9%) and the FDP (15.9%).

In Brusio about 61% of the population (between age 25 and 64) have completed either non-mandatory upper secondary education or additional higher education (either university or a Fachhochschule).

Brusio has an unemployment rate of 1.9%. As of 2005, there were 107 people employed in the primary economic sector and about 30 businesses involved in this sector. 217 people are employed in the secondary sector and there are 24 businesses in this sector. 374 people are employed in the tertiary sector, with 70 businesses in this sector.

From the 2000 census, 1,052 or 87.5% are Roman Catholic, while 91 or 7.6% belonged to the Swiss Reformed Church. There are less than 5 individuals who are Muslims. There are 6 individuals (or about 0.50% of the population) who belong to another church (not listed on the census), 24 (or about 2.00% of the population) belong to no church, are agnostic or atheist, and 29 individuals (or about 2.41% of the population) did not answer the question.

The historical population is given in the following table:

year	population
1803	620
1850	1,000
1900	1,199
1950	1,528
1960	1,445
1970	1,344
1980	1,258
1990	1,220
2000	1,202

== Languages ==
Most of the population (as of 2000) speaks Italian (92.4%), with German being second most common (5.3%) and Portuguese being third (1.0%).

Languages in Brusio
Languages	Census 1980		Census 1990		Census 2000	
Languages	Number	Percent	Number	Percent	Number	Percent
German	43	3.42%	45	3.69%	64	5.32%
Romansh	15	1.19%	12	0.98%	8	0.67%
Italian	1,191	94.67%	1,150	94.26%	1,111	92.43%
Population	1,258	100%	1,220	100%	1,202	100%

== Heritage sites of national significance ==
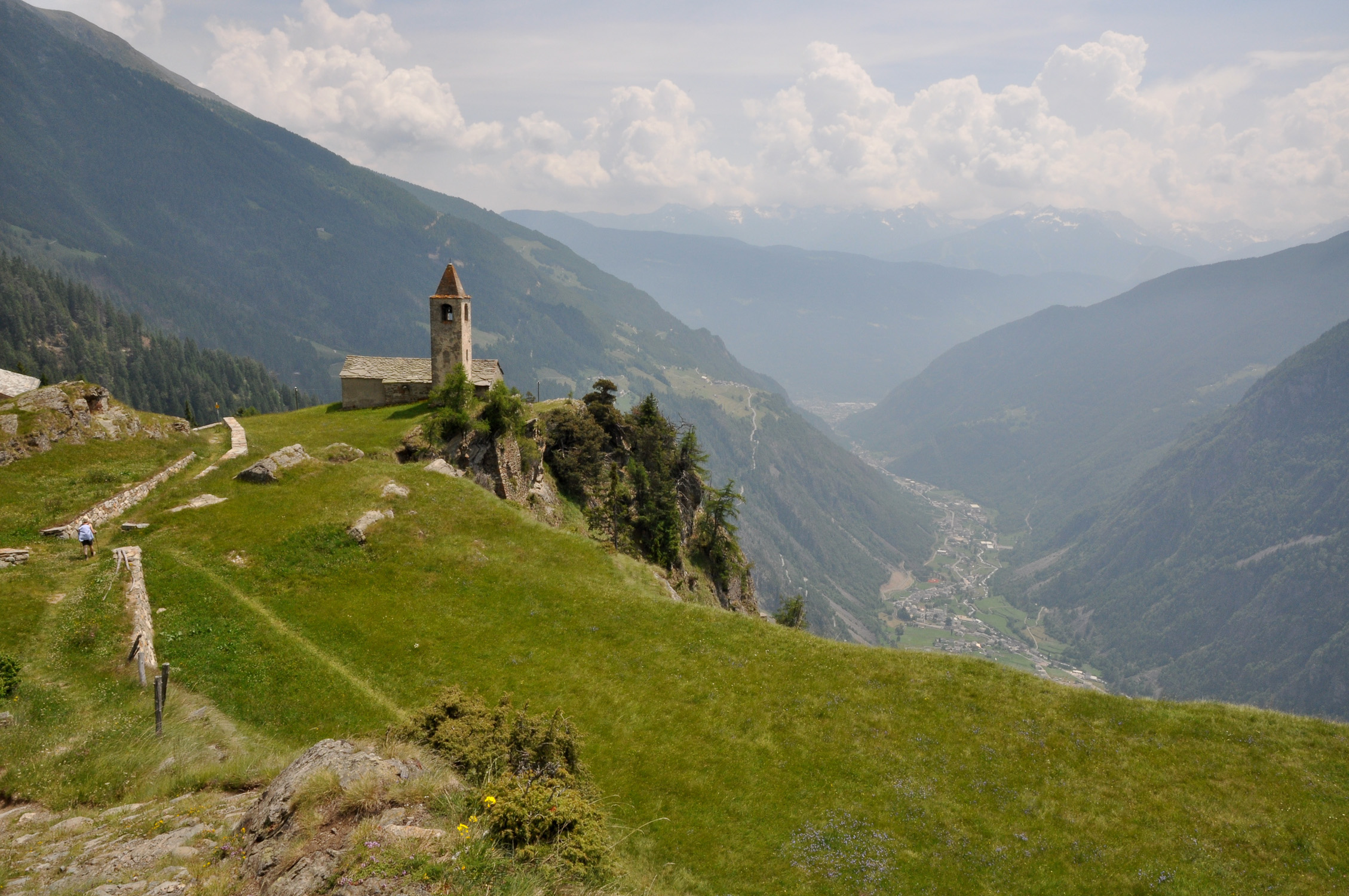
San Romerio Church (Chiesa di San Romerio e dintorni)

The Casa di Risch, Chiesa di San Romerio e dintorni (or San Romerio Church) and Gruppo di 9 «Crot» are listed as Swiss heritage sites of national significance.

The monastery of San Romerio (also San Remigio) was founded in the hills above the Val Poschiavo before 1055. The village of Brusio was settled soon after and was heavily influenced by the monastery.

== Transportation ==
The municipality has three railway stations: Brusio, Campascio, and Campocologno. All three are located on the Bernina line, with regular service to St. Moritz and Tirano. The municipality gives its name to the Brusio spiral viaduct.
