= Li Curt railway station =

Railway station in Switzerland

Li Curt
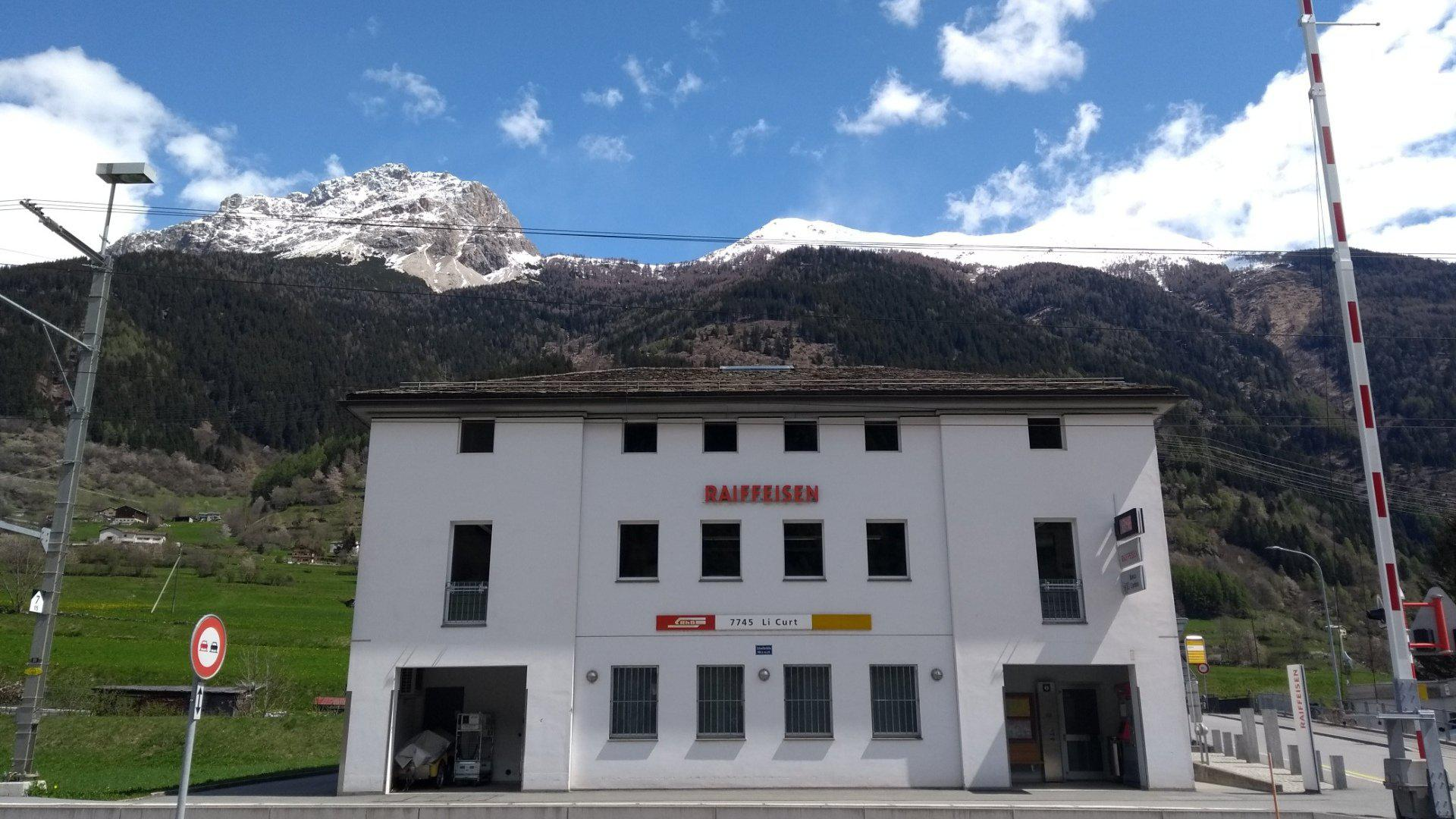
- The station building in 2019

General information
- Location: Li Curt 658A; Poschiavo; Switzerland
- Coordinates: 46°18′40″N 10°03′48″E
- Elevation: 988 m (3,241 ft)
- Owner: Rhaetian Railway
- Line: Bernina line
- Distance: 45.3 km (28.1 mi) from St. Moritz
- Train operators: Rhaetian Railway
- Connections: AutoPostale buses

History
- Opened: 1 July 1908

Passengers
- 2018: 50 per weekday

Services
Preceding station	Rhaetian Railway	Following station
Poschiavo towards St. Moritz	R 19	Le Prese towards Tirano
Location

Li Curt railway station is a railway station in the municipality of Poschiavo, in the Swiss canton of Graubünden. It is located on the Bernina line of the Rhaetian Railway.

The station is located on a road-side section of the Bernina line, and comprises a single track with a single platform and a station building. To the north of the station, the line shares the street with road traffic as it passes the Sant'Antonio church. To the south, as far as Le Prese, the line runs alongside the road.

== Services ==
As of the December 2023 timetable change, the following services stop at Li Curt:

- Regio: service every 2 hours between St. Moritz and Tirano.
