= Brusio railway station =

Railway station in Switzerland

Brusio
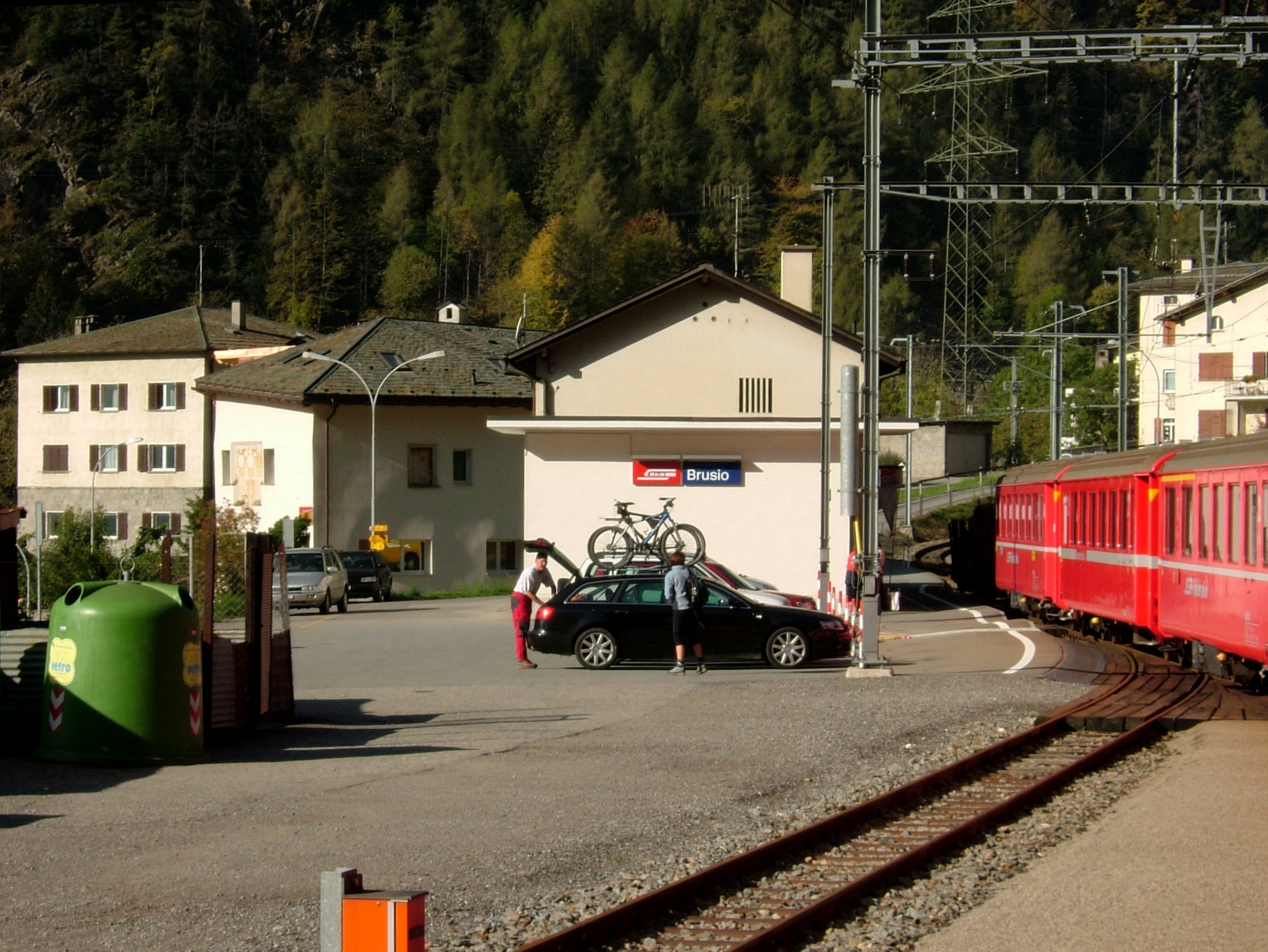
- A train arrives at the station in 2007

General information
- Location: Via Stazione; Brusio; Switzerland
- Coordinates: 46°15′34″N 10°07′31″E
- Elevation: 779 m (2,556 ft)
- Owner: Rhaetian Railway
- Line: Bernina line
- Distance: 53.9 km (33.5 mi) from St. Moritz
- Train operators: Rhaetian Railway
- Connections: AutoPostale buses

History
- Opened: 1 July 1908

Passengers
- 2018: 60 per weekday

Services
Preceding station	Rhaetian Railway	Following station
Miralago towards St. Moritz	RE 9	Campocologno towards Tirano
Miralago towards St. Moritz	R 19	Campascio towards Tirano
Location

Brusio railway station is a railway station in the municipality of Brusio, in the Swiss canton of Graubünden. It is located on the 1,000 mm (3 ft 3 3/8 in) metre gauge Bernina line of the Rhaetian Railway. Hourly services operate on this line.

== Services ==
As of the December 2023 timetable change, the following services stop at Brusio:

- RegioExpress / Regio: hourly service between St. Moritz and Tirano.
