= Cadera railway station =

Railway station in Graubünden, Switzerland

Cadera
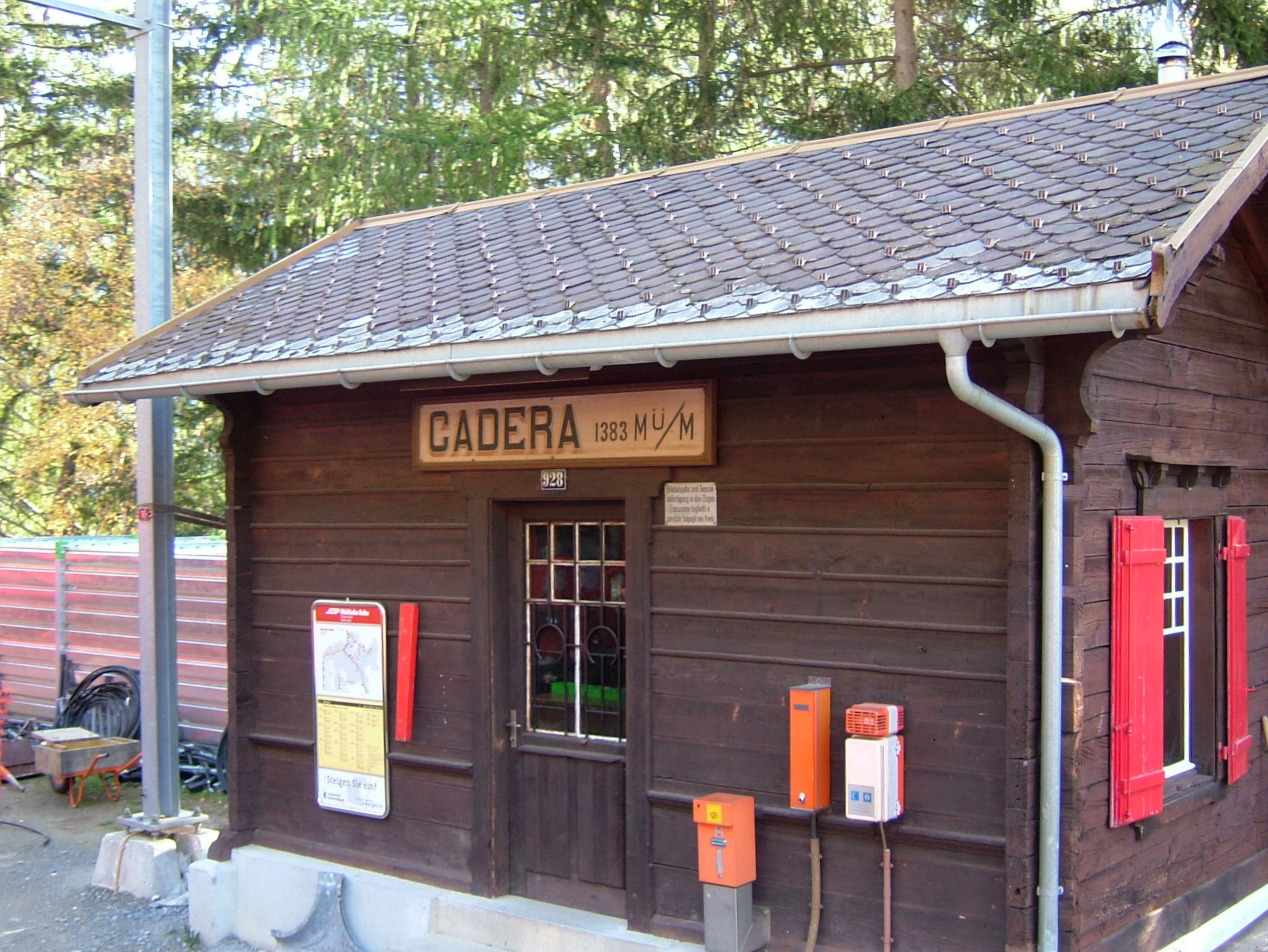
- The station building in 2007

General information
- Location: Poschiavo; Switzerland
- Coordinates: 46°20′43″N 10°03′05″E
- Elevation: 1,383 m (4,537 ft)
- Owner: Rhaetian Railway
- Line: Bernina line
- Distance: 38.2 km (23.7 mi) from St. Moritz
- Train operators: Rhaetian Railway

History
- Opened: 5 July 1910

Passengers
- 2018: 50 per weekday

Services
Preceding station	Rhaetian Railway	Following station
Cavaglia towards St. Moritz	R 19	Poschiavo towards Tirano
Location

Cadera railway station is a railway station in the municipality of Poschiavo, in the Swiss canton of Graubünden. It is located on the Bernina line of the Rhaetian Railway.

The station has two through tracks, only one of which is served by its single platform. There is a small, single-story timber station building.

== Services ==
As of the December 2023 timetable change, the following services stop (only on request) at Cadera:

- Regio: service every two hours between St. Moritz and Tirano.
