= Cavaglia railway station =

Railway station in Switzerland

Cavaglia
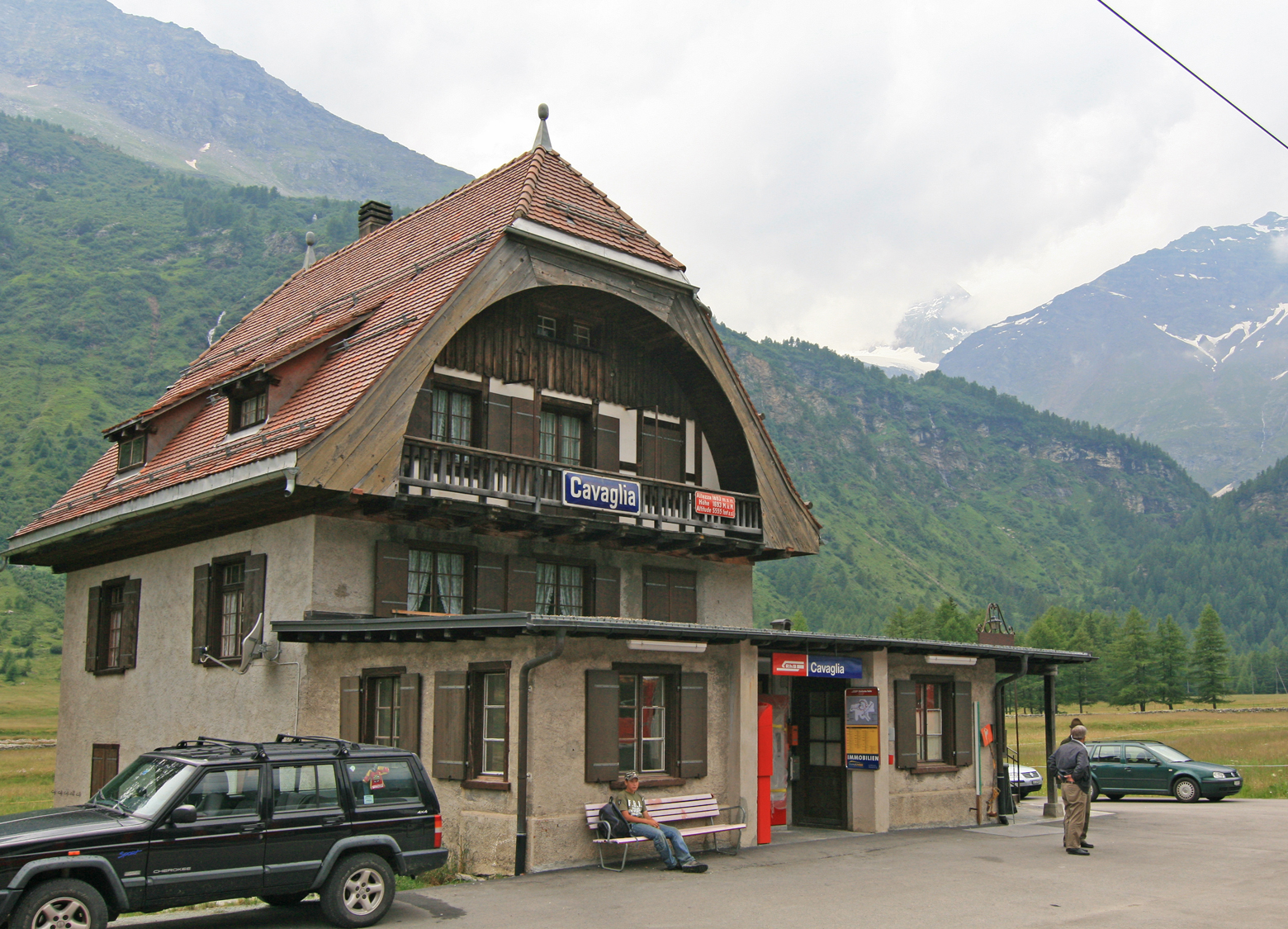
- The station in 2008

General information
- Location: Poschiavo; Switzerland
- Coordinates: 46°21′51″N 10°02′38″E
- Elevation: 1,692 m (5,551 ft)
- Owner: Rhaetian Railway
- Line: Bernina line
- Distance: 33.1 km (20.6 mi) from St. Moritz
- Train operators: Rhaetian Railway

History
- Opened: 5 July 1910

Passengers
- 2018: 200 per weekday

Services
Preceding station	Rhaetian Railway	Following station
Alp Grüm towards St. Moritz	RE 9	Poschiavo towards Tirano
Alp Grüm towards St. Moritz	R 19	Cadera towards Tirano
Location

Cavaglia railway station is a railway station in the village of Cavaglia, within the municipality of Poschiavo in the Swiss canton of Graubünden. It is located on the Bernina line of the Rhaetian Railway.

The station has three through tracks and two sidings. All three through tracks are served by platforms and station buildings.

The section of line between Ospizio Bernina and Poschiavo, on which the station is located, was opened in 1910. Initially Cavaglia was simply a crossing loop, but in 1911 it became the winter terminus of the southern section of the line, with the line over the Bernina pass operating only during the summer months, a situation that continued until the winter of 1913/4. The current station building was opened in 1912 as a privately owned hotel, being taken over by the railway in 1925, when a station office and waiting room was added.

A popular tourist destination near this stop are a series of pot holes (giant's kettle).

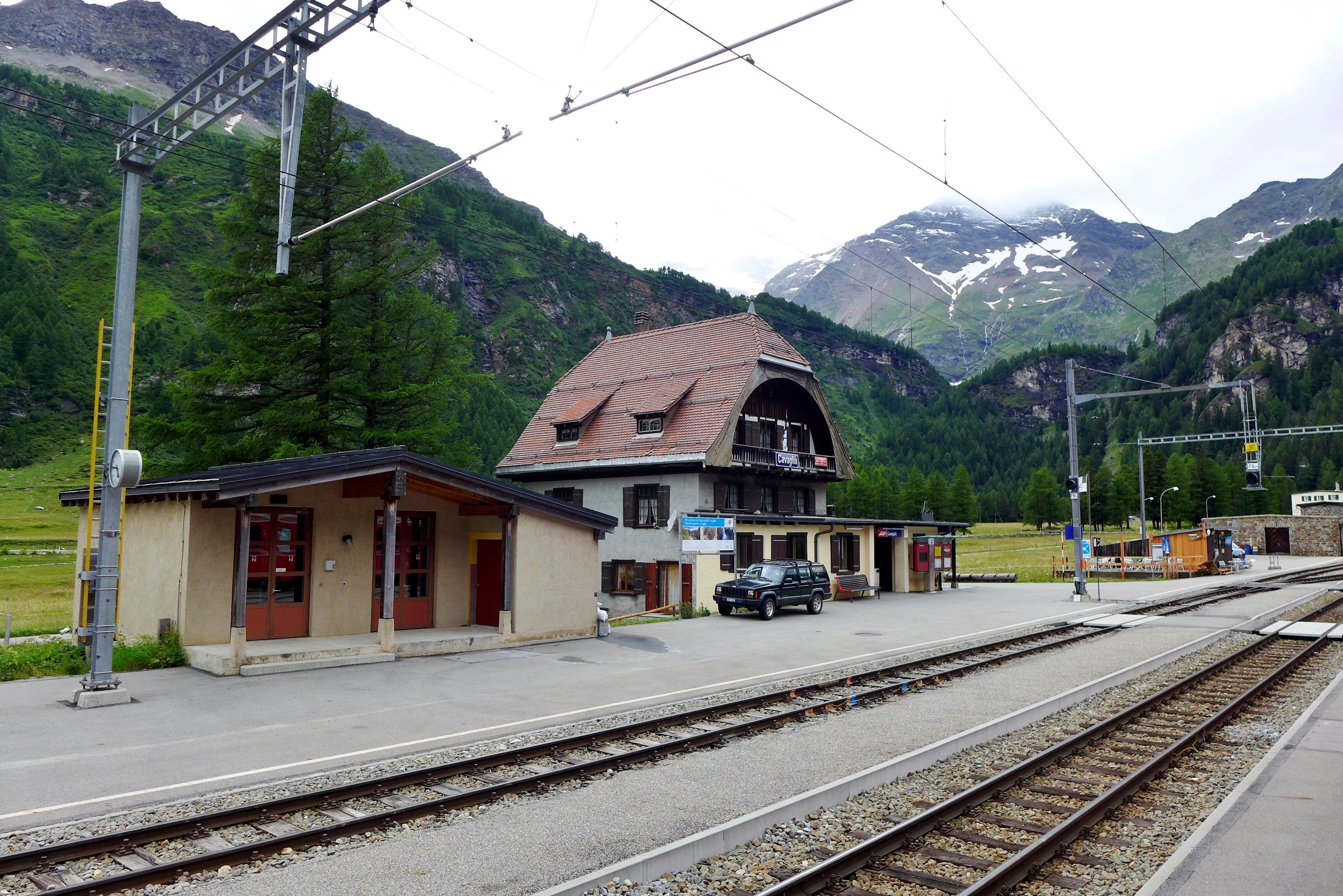
The railway station and buildings in 2014.

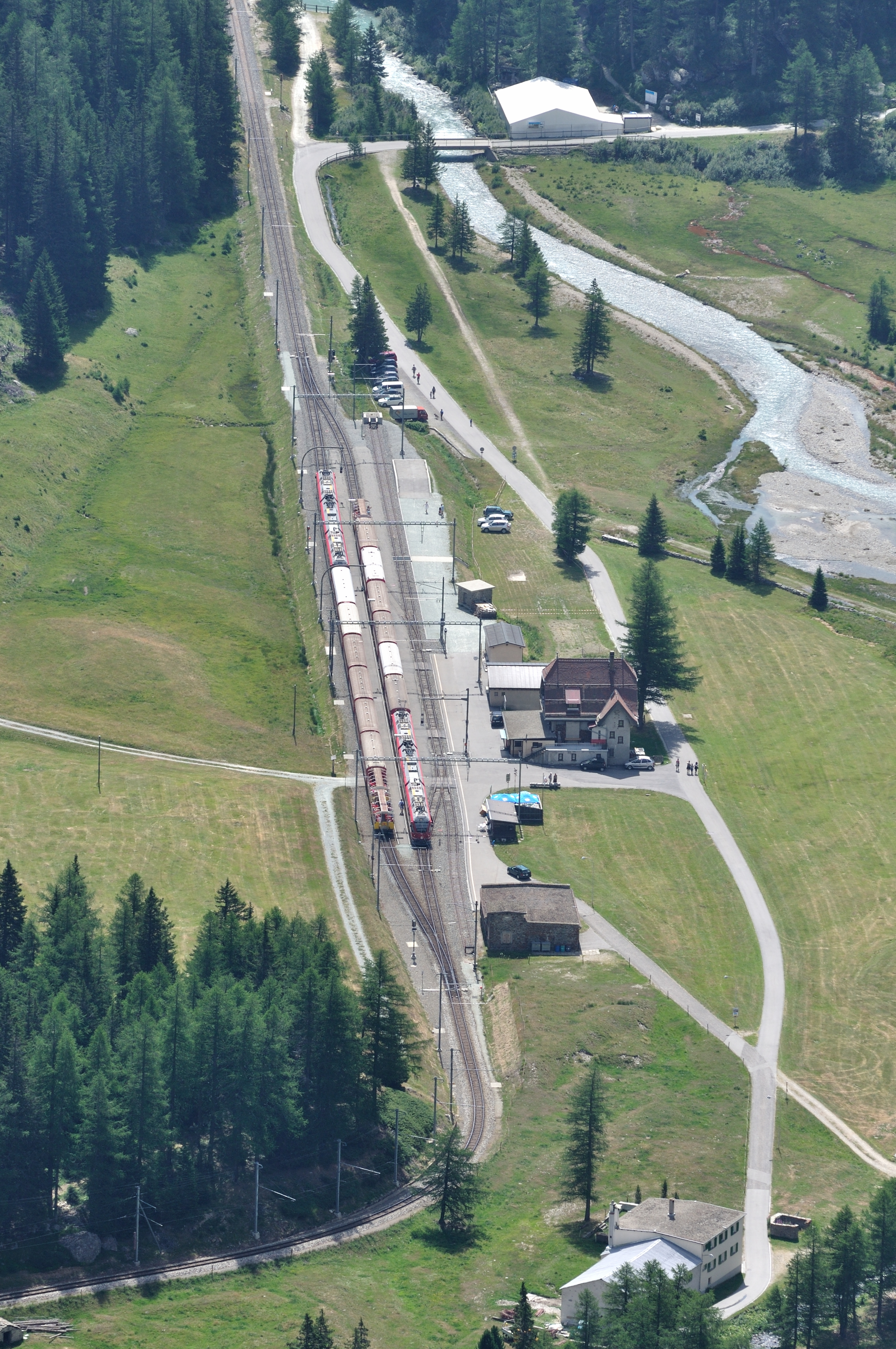
Cavaglia station viewed from Alp Grüm.

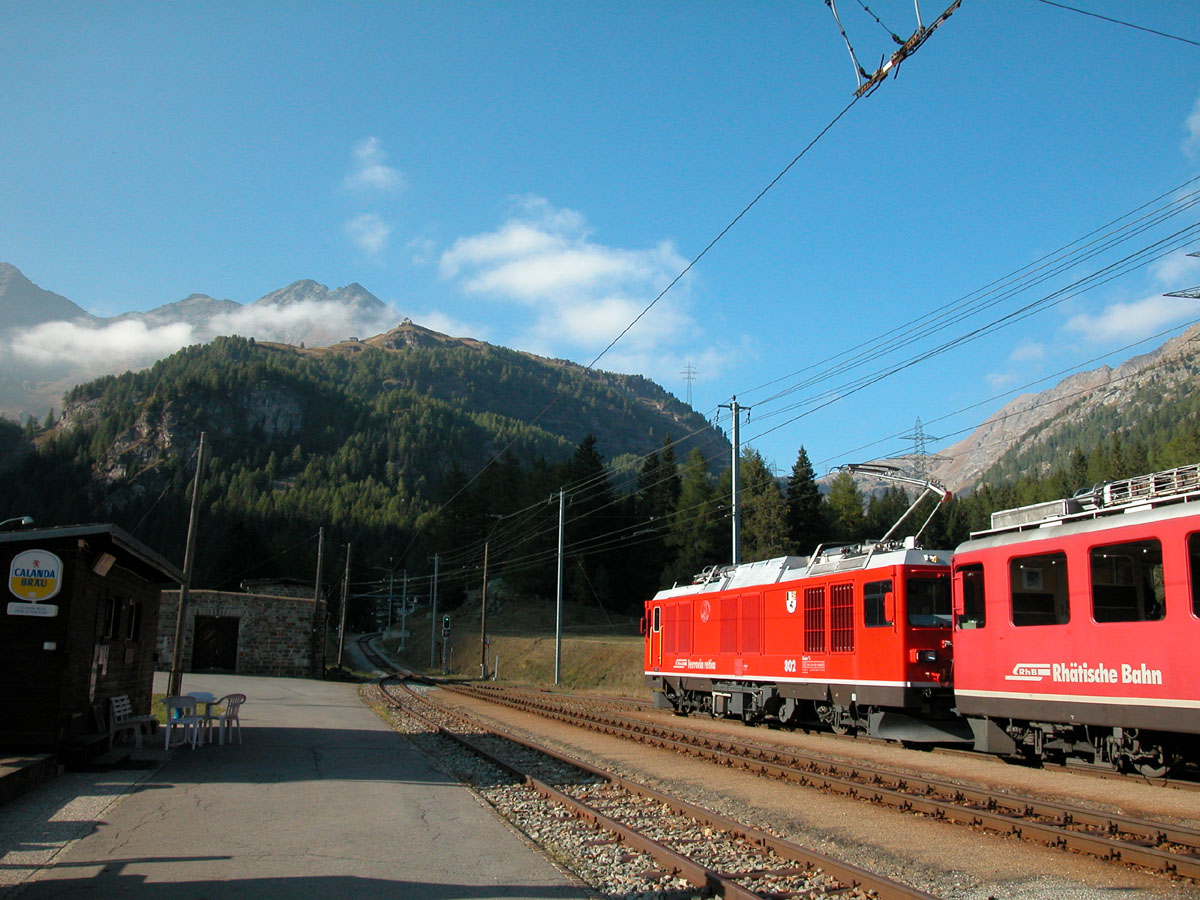
View back to Alp Grüm (in the middle distance). The overhead masts of the famous sky turn can just be made out.

== Services ==
As of the December 2023 timetable change, the following services stop at Cavaglia:

- RegioExpress / Regio: hourly service between St. Moritz and Tirano.
