= Miralago railway station =

Railway station in Switzerland

Miralago
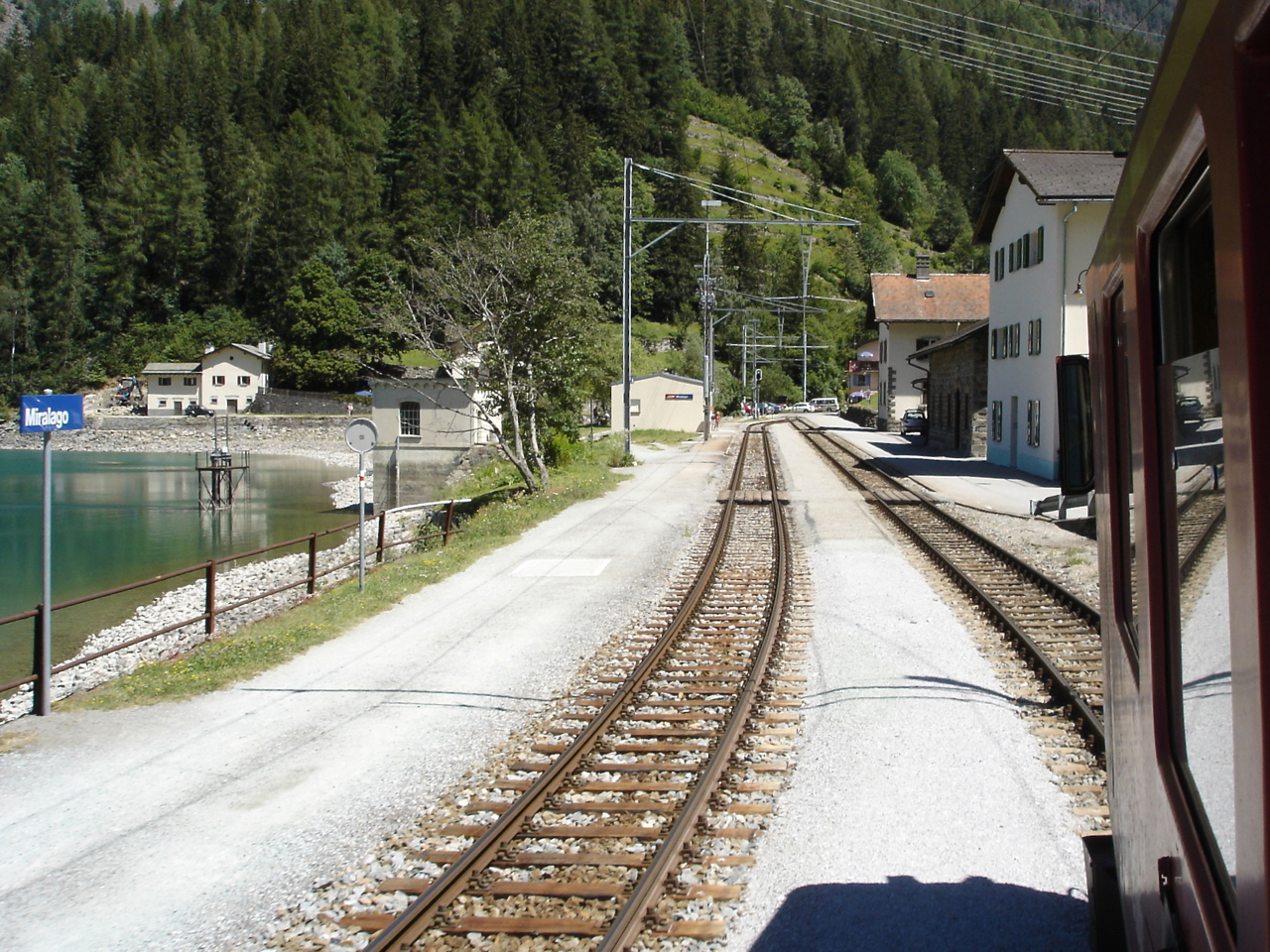
- The station, with lake and station building to the left, and village houses to the right

General information
- Location: Poschiavo; Switzerland
- Coordinates: 46°16′23″N 10°05′58″E
- Elevation: 964 m (3,163 ft)
- Owner: Rhaetian Railway
- Line: Bernina line
- Distance: 50.8 km (31.6 mi) from St. Moritz
- Train operators: Rhaetian Railway
- Connections: AutoPostale buses

History
- Opened: 1 July 1908

Passengers
- 2018: 60 per weekday

Services
Preceding station	Rhaetian Railway	Following station
Le Prese towards St. Moritz	RE 9	Brusio towards Tirano
Le Prese towards St. Moritz	R 19	Brusio towards Tirano
Location

Miralago railway station, previously known as Meschino railway station, is a station in the village of Miralago, within the municipality of Poschiavo and in the Swiss canton of Graubünden. It is located on the Bernina line of the Rhaetian Railway.

The station lies between the village and the Lago di Poschiavo, and has two through tracks, both served by ground level platforms, and a simple single story station building. To the north, as far as Le Prese, the line runs between the main road and the lake. To the south, the line runs briefly in the carriageway of a minor village street before crossing the Poschiavino river by a skew arch and commencing a more or less continuous 7% descent towards Brusio.

The Lago di Poschiavo acts as a reservoir serving hydro-electric plants downstream, and one of the reasons for the construction of the Bernina railway was to provide access to these works. The line was financed by Kraftwerke Brusio AG, the builders of the dam and power station. The station opened on 1 July 1908 with the opening of the Tirano to Poschiavo section of the Bernina line. Originally known as Meschino, the station was renamed to its current name in 1938.

== Services ==
As of the December 2023 timetable change, the following services stop at Miralago:

- RegioExpress / Regio: hourly service between St. Moritz and Tirano.
