= Le Prese railway station =

Railway station in Switzerland

Le Prese
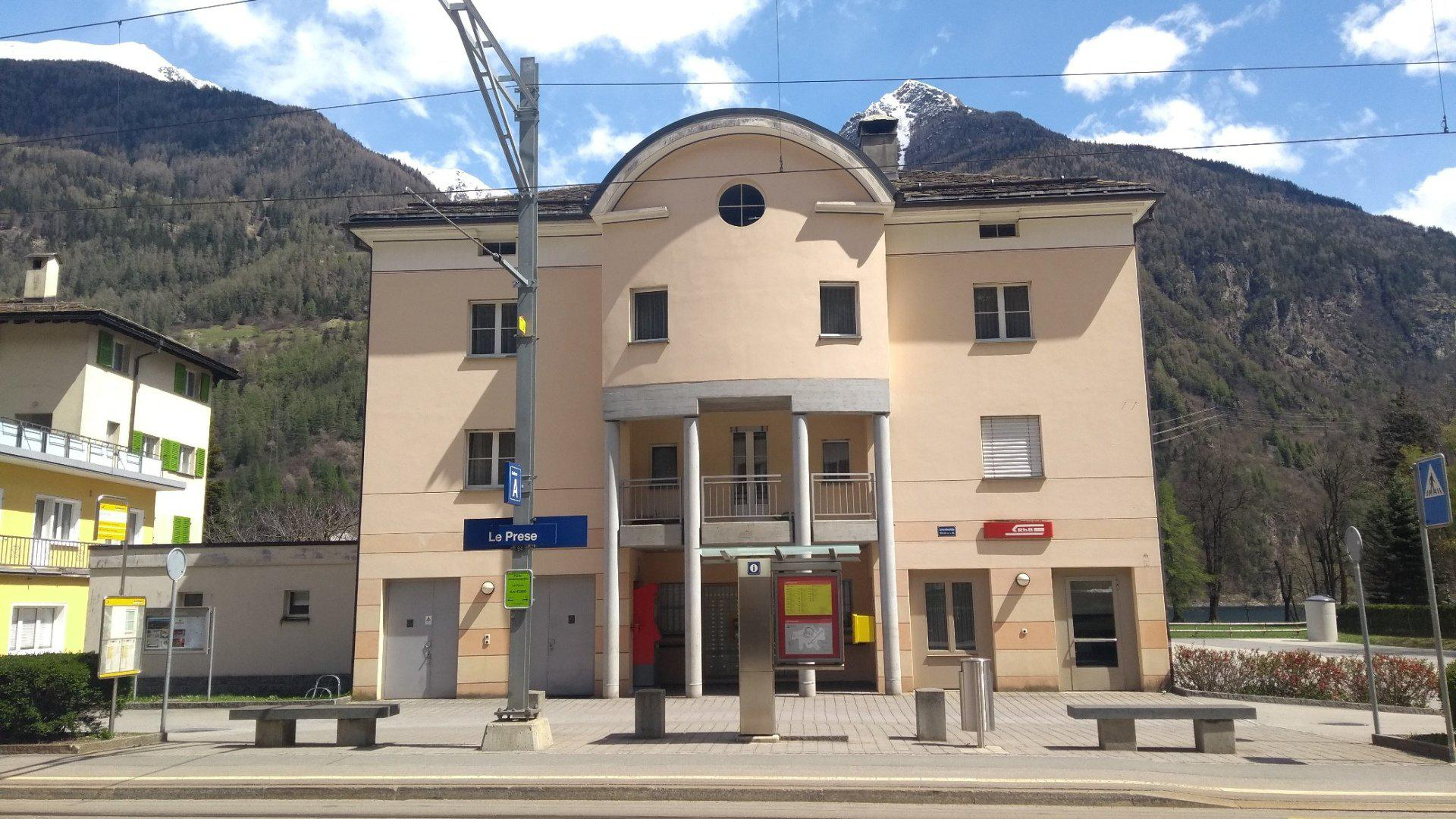
- The station building in 2019

General information
- Location: Via Principale; Poschiavo; Switzerland
- Coordinates: 46°17′32″N 10°04′40″E
- Elevation: 966 m (3,169 ft)
- Owner: Rhaetian Railway
- Line: Bernina line
- Distance: 48.0 km (29.8 mi) from St. Moritz
- Train operators: Rhaetian Railway
- Connections: AutoPostale buses

History
- Opened: 1 July 1908

Passengers
- 2018: 180 per weekday

Services
Preceding station	Rhaetian Railway	Following station
Poschiavo towards Chur or St. Moritz	Bernina Express	Campocologno towards Tirano
Poschiavo towards St. Moritz	RE 9	Miralago towards Tirano
Li Curt towards St. Moritz	R 19	Miralago towards Tirano
Location

Le Prese railway station is a railway station in the village of Le Prese, within the municipality of Poschiavo and canton of Graubünden in Switzerland. It is located on the Bernina line of the Rhaetian Railway.

The station is located in the road, and comprises a single track within the carriageway, with a single kerbside platform and a roadside station building. To the north of the station, the line continues to share the street with road traffic as it passes through the village of Le Prese, before reaching the passing loop of Spinadascio. To the south, as far as Miralago, the line runs between the road and Lago di Poschiavo.

The station opened on 1 July 1908 with the opening of the Tirano to Poschiavo section of the Bernina line. Originally train services halted directly in front of the entrance to the hotel, and until 1975 the station had a passing loop.

== Architecture and setting ==
The station building was erected in 1908 to a standard Bernina line design by architect Hans Studer: a three-storey block of quarry-faced gneiss with arched ground-floor openings and a half-hipped roof, echoing local Val Poschiavo farmhouses. It functioned as a combined railway office and annex to the neighbouring Hotel Le Prese, so the original platform lay directly against the hotel terrace. The structure is today listed in the Federal Inventory of Cultural Property (category B, regional significance).

== Track layout and upgrades ==
Le Prese is one of only four stations on the Bernina line where trains share the roadway with mixed traffic; through the village the timetable limits speed to 25 km/h and motorists must yield at flag-controlled entrances. The passing loop was removed in 1975, but a 2010–12 project installed a new 40 m-kerbside platform at the regulation 350 mm height, tactile paving for the visually impaired, and LED road signals that interlock with the railway block system. Control of the points and street-running signals is performed remotely from the Poschiavo operations centre.

== Services ==
As of the December 2023 timetable change, the following services stop at Le Prese:

- Bernina Express: Several round-trips per day between Chur or St. Moritz and Tirano.
- RegioExpress / Regio: hourly service between St. Moritz and Tirano.
