= Miralago =

- village
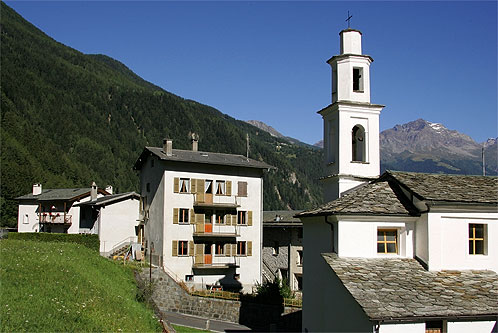

- Location within Switzerland
- Coordinates: 46°16′24″N 10°06′03″E
- Country: Switzerland
- Subdivision: Poschiavo, Brusio

Miralago is a village in the Val Poschiavo in the canton of Graubünden, Switzerland. It lies at 964 metres (3,163 ft) above sea level at the southern end of Lago di Poschiavo, and the Poschiavino river flows out of the lake in the village. The village is some 7 kilometres (4.3 mi) south of the village of Poschiavo and 3 kilometres (1.9 mi) north of the village of Brusio.

Miralago railway station, on the Bernina railway line, and the Cappella San Gottardo, built between 1682 and 1694, lie within the village. The village is actually bisected by the boundary between the municipalities of Poschiavo and Brusio, with the railway station and most of the houses in Poschiavo, but the church and some houses in Brusio.

Until 1938, Miralago was called Meschino (‘poor, miserable’). With the rise of tourism, the name was changed to the more appealing Miralago (lake view).
