= Campascio railway station =

Railway station in Switzerland

Campascio
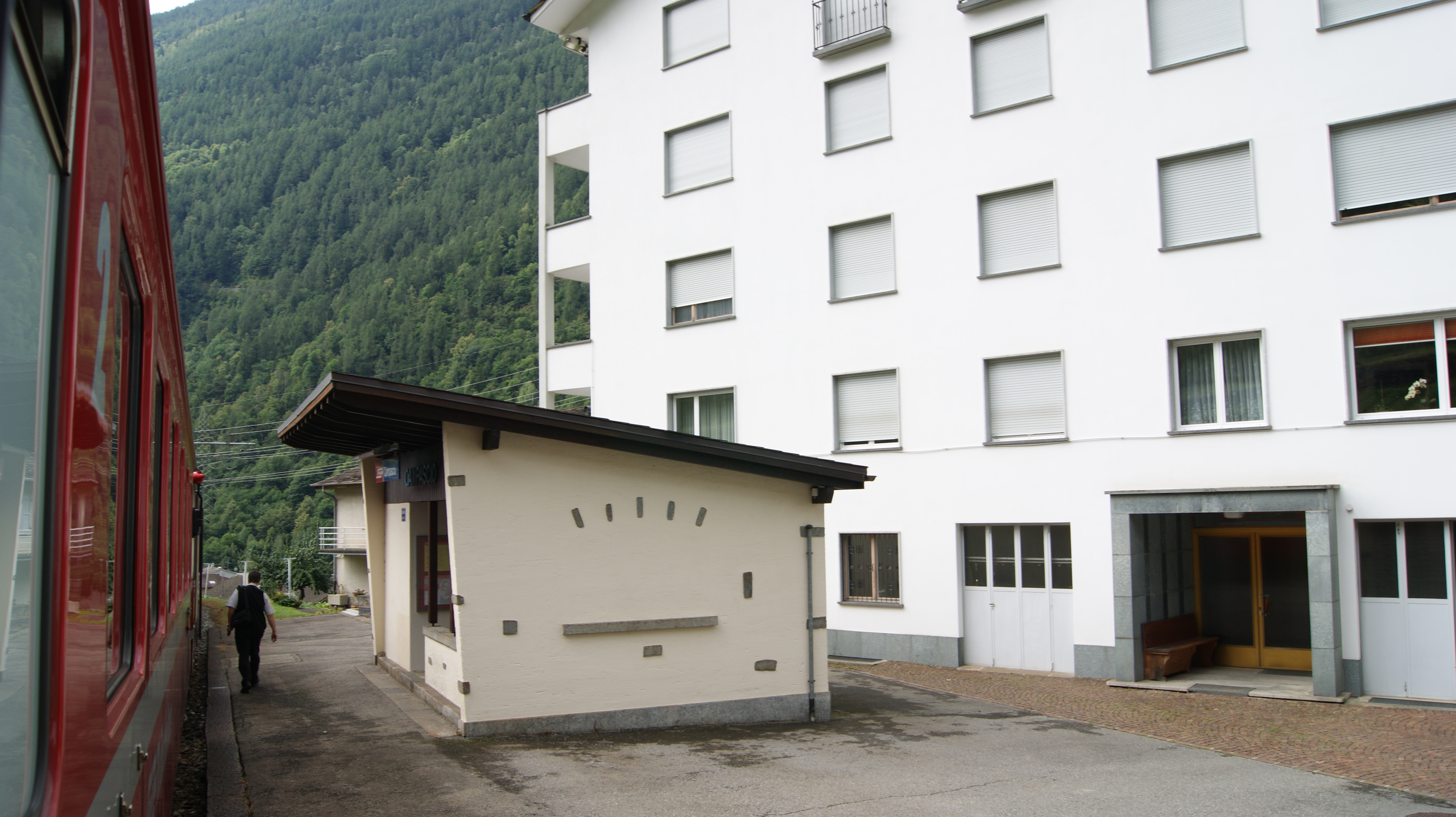
- A train at the platform in 2018

General information
- Location: Via Principale 190; Brusio; Switzerland
- Coordinates: 46°14′41″N 10°07′54″E
- Elevation: 636 m (2,087 ft)
- Owner: Rhaetian Railway
- Line: Bernina line
- Distance: 56.2 km (34.9 mi) from St. Moritz
- Train operators: Rhaetian Railway

History
- Opened: 1 July 1908

Passengers
- 2018: 50 per weekday

Services
Preceding station	Rhaetian Railway	Following station
Brusio towards St. Moritz	R 19	Campocologno towards Tirano
Location

Campascio railway station is a railway station in the municipality of Brusio, in the Swiss canton of Graubünden. It is located on the 1,000 mm (3 ft 3 3/8 in) metre gauge Bernina line of the Rhaetian Railway. Hourly services operate on this line, but not all trains stop at this station.

== Services ==
As of the December 2023 timetable change, the following services stop at Campascio:

- Regio: service every two hours between St. Moritz and Tirano.
