= Campocologno railway station =

Railway station in Switzerland

Campocologno
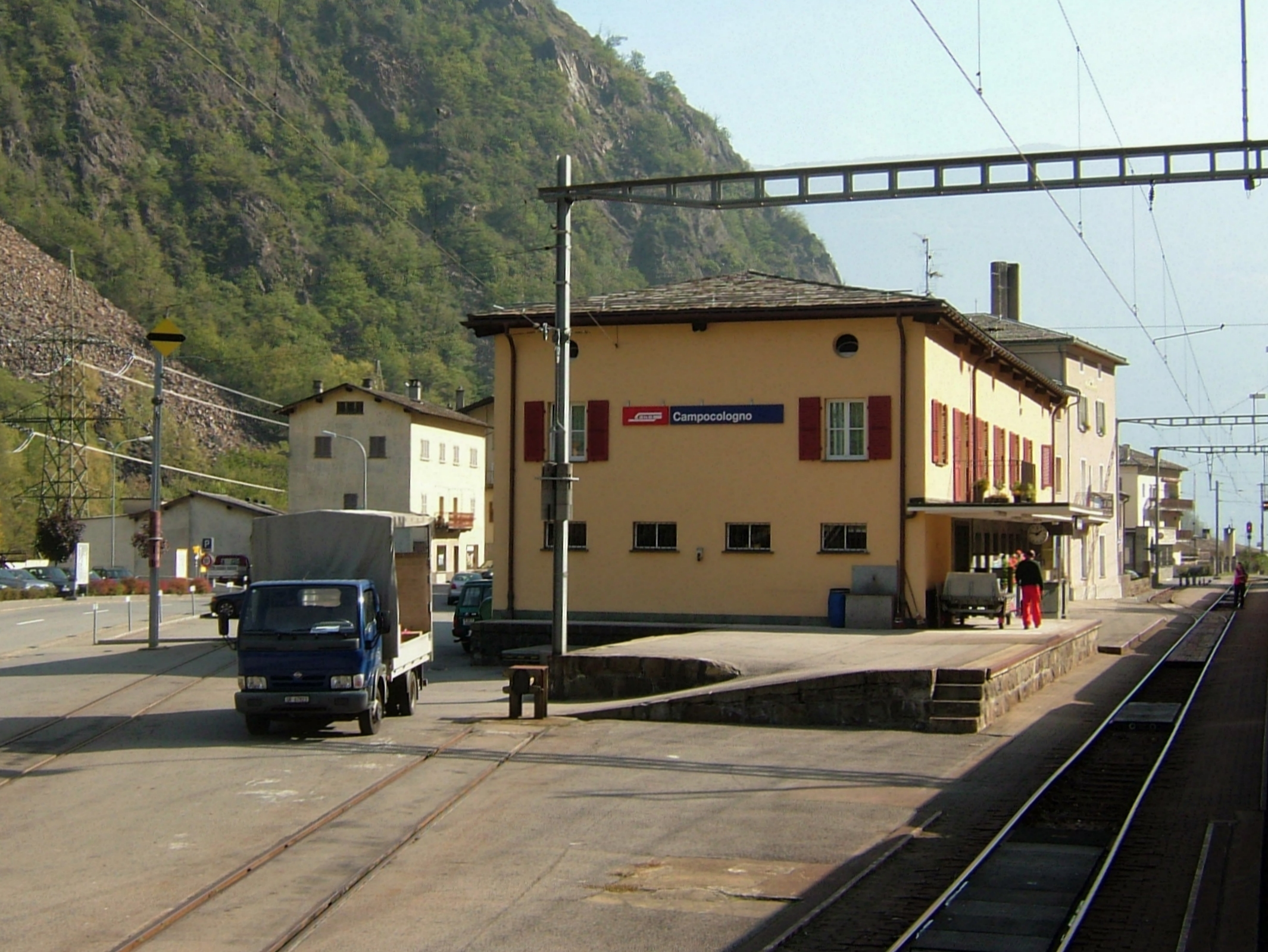
- The station in 2007, looking south

General information
- Location: Via Principale 65; Brusio; Switzerland
- Coordinates: 46°14′00″N 10°08′31″E
- Elevation: 552 m (1,811 ft)
- Owner: Rhaetian Railway
- Line: Bernina line
- Distance: 57.6 km (35.8 mi) from St. Moritz
- Train operators: Rhaetian Railway
- Connections: AutoPostale buses

History
- Opened: 1 July 1908

Passengers
- 2018: 50 per weekday

Services
Preceding station	Rhaetian Railway	Following station
Le Prese towards Chur or St. Moritz	Bernina Express	Tirano Terminus
Campascio towards St. Moritz	RE 9	Tirano Terminus
Campascio towards St. Moritz	R 19	Tirano Terminus
Location

Campocologno railway station is a railway station in the municipality of Brusio, in the Swiss canton of Graubünden. It is located at the border between Italy and Switzerland and is an intermediate stop on the 1,000 mm (3 ft 3 3/8 in) metre gauge Bernina line of the Rhaetian Railway. Hourly services operate on this line.

Just north of the station the railway shares a bridge over the Poschiavino river with Hauptstrasse 29.

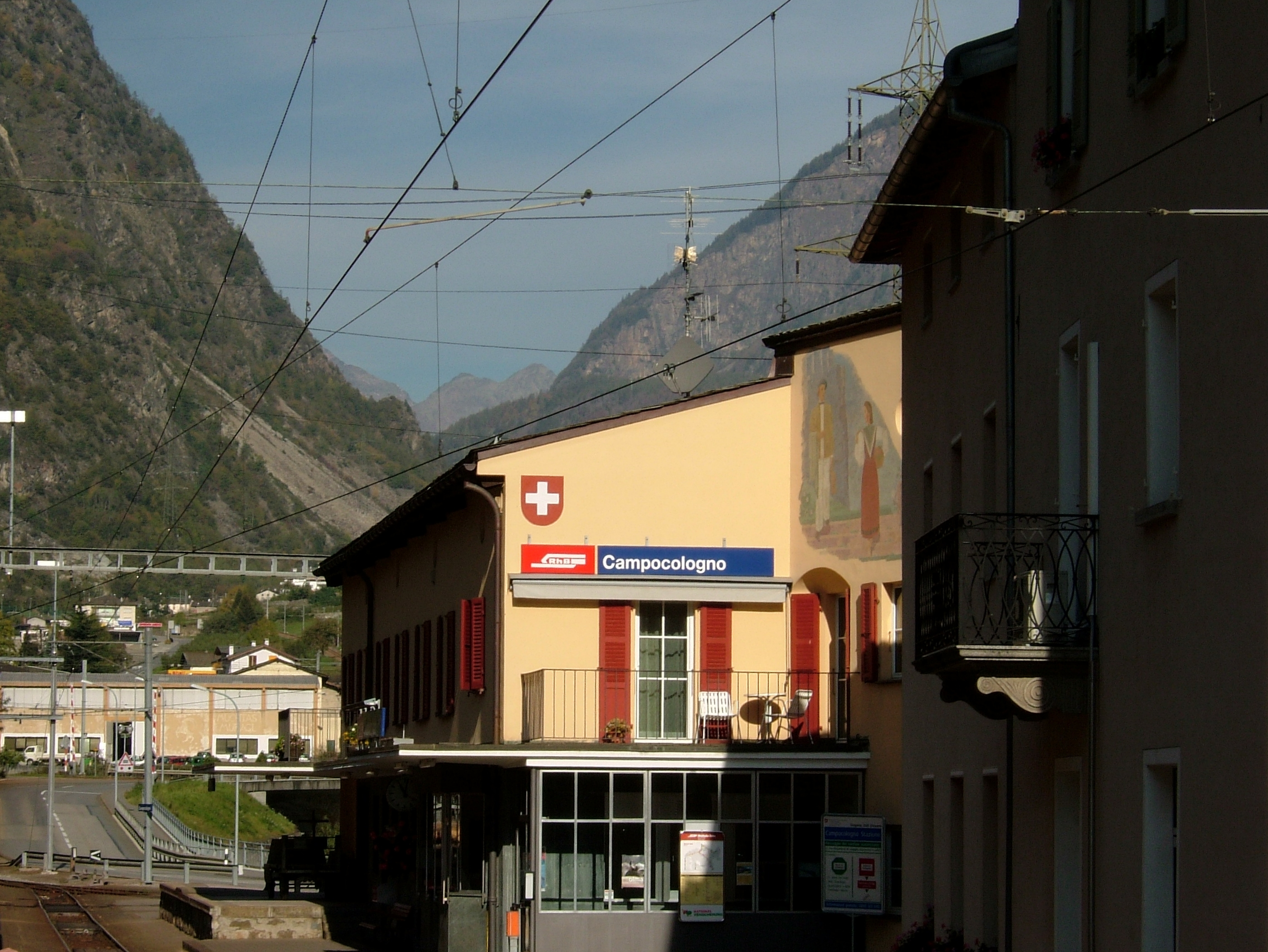
Campocologno station, looking north

== Services ==
As of the December 2023 timetable change, the following trains stop at Campocologno:

- Bernina Express: Several round-trips per day between Chur or St. Moritz and Tirano.
- RegioExpress / Regio: hourly service between St. Moritz and Tirano.

== See also ==
- Rail transport in Switzerland
