= Celerina Staz railway station =

Railway station in Switzerland

Celerina Staz
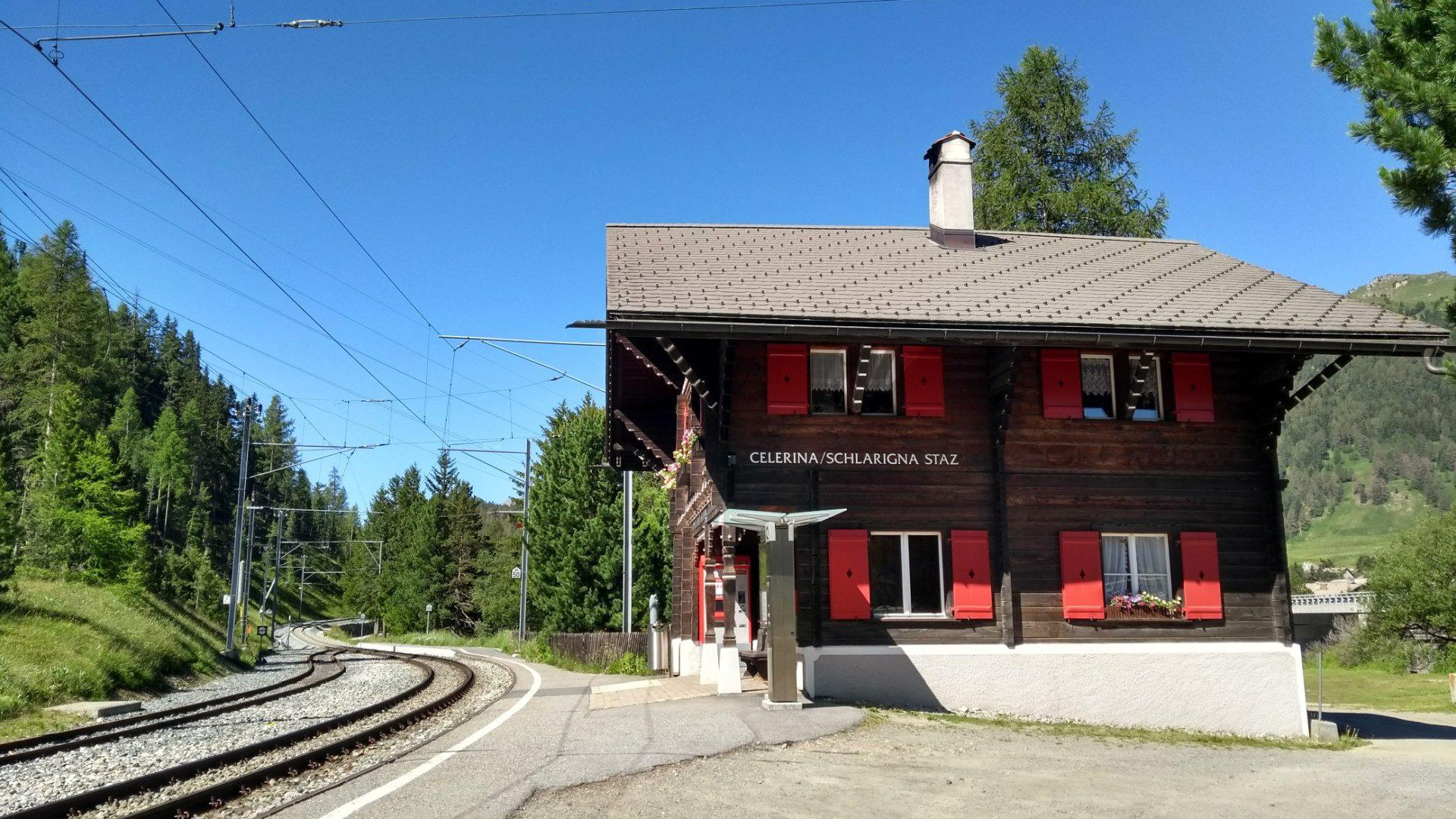
- The station building in 2018

General information
- Location: Via Bambas-ch 6; 7505 Celerina; Celerina/Schlarigna; Switzerland
- Coordinates: 46°30′35″N 9°51′54″E
- Elevation: 1,717 m (5,633 ft)
- Owner: Rhaetian Railway
- Line: Bernina line
- Distance: 2.0 km (1.2 mi) from St. Moritz
- Train operators: Rhaetian Railway

Other information
- Fare zone: 10 (Engadin Mobil)

History
- Opened: 18 August 1908

Passengers
- 2018: 50 per weekday

Services
Preceding station	Rhaetian Railway	Following station
St. Moritz Terminus	RE 9	Punt Muragl Staz towards Tirano
St. Moritz Terminus	R 19	Punt Muragl Staz towards Tirano
Location

Celerina Staz railway station is a railway station in the municipality of Celerina, in the Swiss canton of Graubünden. It is located on the Bernina line of the Rhaetian Railway.

The station has a single through track and a single platform with a station building. There is a siding in the station.

Celerina railway station, on the Albula line of the Rhaetian Railway, is located roughly 900 metres (3,000 ft) to the north within the village of Celerina.

== Services ==
As of the December 2023 timetable change, the following services stop at Celerina Staz:

- RegioExpress / Regio: hourly service between St. Moritz and Tirano.
