= Bernina Region =

Coordinates: 46°20′8″N 10°4′40″E

Bernina Region Regione Bernina (Italian)
- District
- Country: Switzerland
- Canton: Graubünden

Area
  - Total: 237.31 km^{2} (91.63 sq mi)

Population (2020)
  - Total: 4,561
  - Density: 19.22/km^{2} (49.78/sq mi)
- Time zone: UTC+1 (CET)
  - Summer (DST): UTC+2 (CEST)
- Municipalities: 2

Bernina Region is one of the eleven administrative districts in the canton of Graubünden in Switzerland. It had an area of 237.31 square kilometers (91.63 sq mi) and a population of 4,561 (as of 31 December 2020). It was created on 1 January 2017 as part of a reorganization of the Canton.

Municipalities in the Bernina Region
Municipality	Population (31 December 2020)	Area (km^{2})
Brusio	1,120	46.3
Poschiavo	3,441	191.01
