= Bernina railway line =

Narrow gauge railway line in Graubünden, Switzerland

Rhaetian Railway in the Albula / Bernina Landscapes
UNESCO World Heritage Site
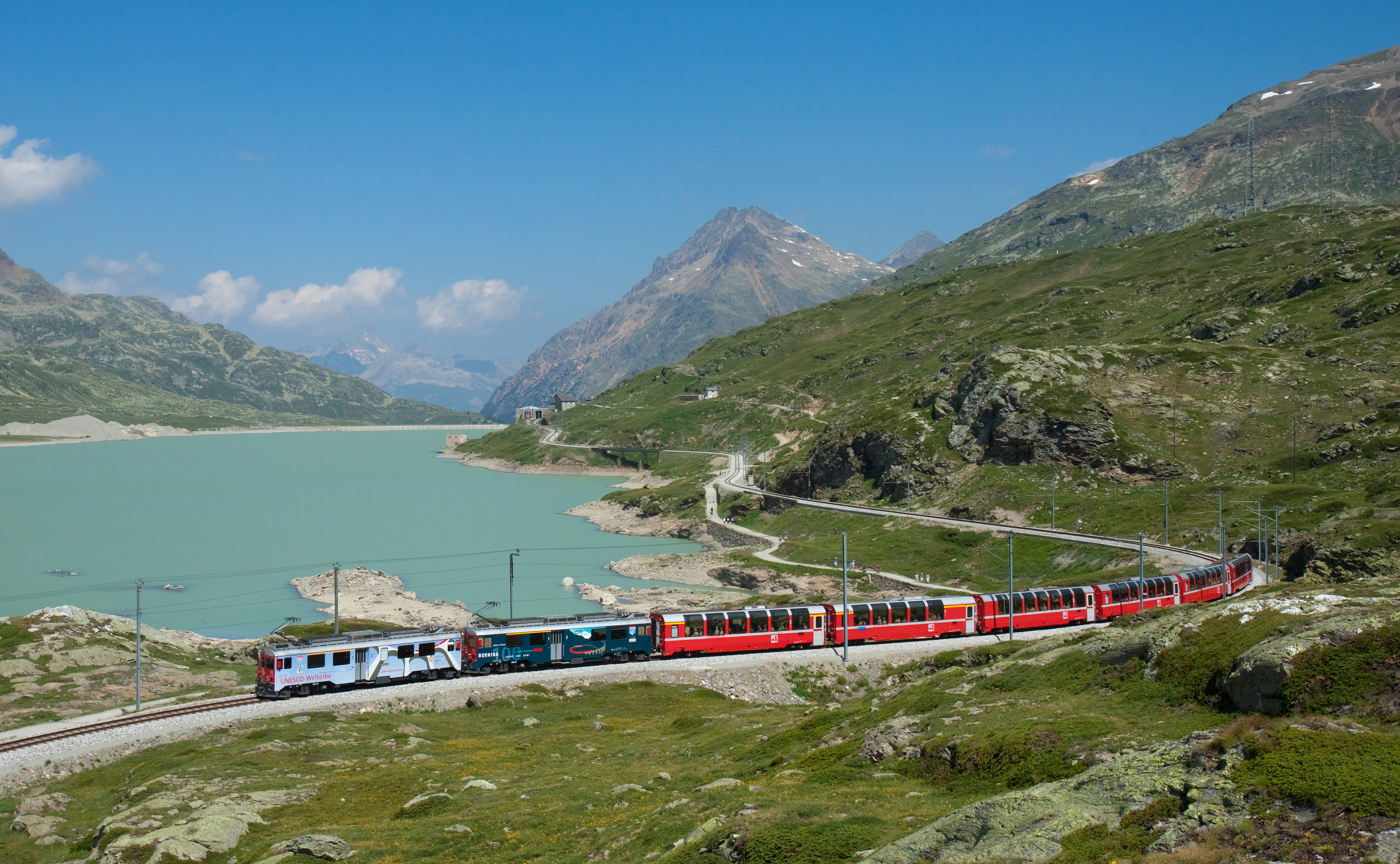
- Two Rhaetian Railway ABe 4/4 III multiple units with a Bernina Express train on the Bernina railway line, passing Lago Bianco with Ospizio Bernina railway station in the background

- Location within Canton of Grisons Location within Switzerland
- Location: Graubünden, Switzerland
- Part of: Rhaetian Railway in the Albula / Bernina Landscapes
- Criteria: Cultural: (ii), (iv)
- Reference: 1276
- Inscription: 2008 (32nd Session)
- Coordinates: 46°24′32″N 10°1′11″E

The Bernina railway line (German: Berninalinie; Italian: Linea del Bernina; Romansh: Lingia dal Bernina) is a single-track 1,000 mm (3 ft 3 3/8 in) metre gauge railway line forming part of the Rhaetian Railway (RhB). It links the spa resort of St. Moritz, in the canton of Graubünden, Switzerland, with the town of Tirano, in the Province of Sondrio, Italy, via the Bernina Pass. Reaching a height of 2,253 metres (7,392 ft) above sea level, it is the highest railway crossing in Europe and the third-highest railway in Switzerland. It also ranks as the highest adhesion railway of the continent, and—with inclines of up to 7%—as one of the steepest adhesion railways in the world. The elevation difference on the section between the Bernina Pass and Tirano is 1,824 m (5,984 ft), allowing passengers to view glaciers along the line.

On 7 July 2008, the Bernina line and the Albula railway line, which also forms part of the RhB, were recorded in the list of UNESCO World Heritage Sites, under the name Rhaetian Railway in the Albula / Bernina Landscapes. The whole site is a cross-border joint Swiss-Italian heritage area.

Trains operating on the Bernina line include the Bernina Express.

== History ==
Bernina railway line
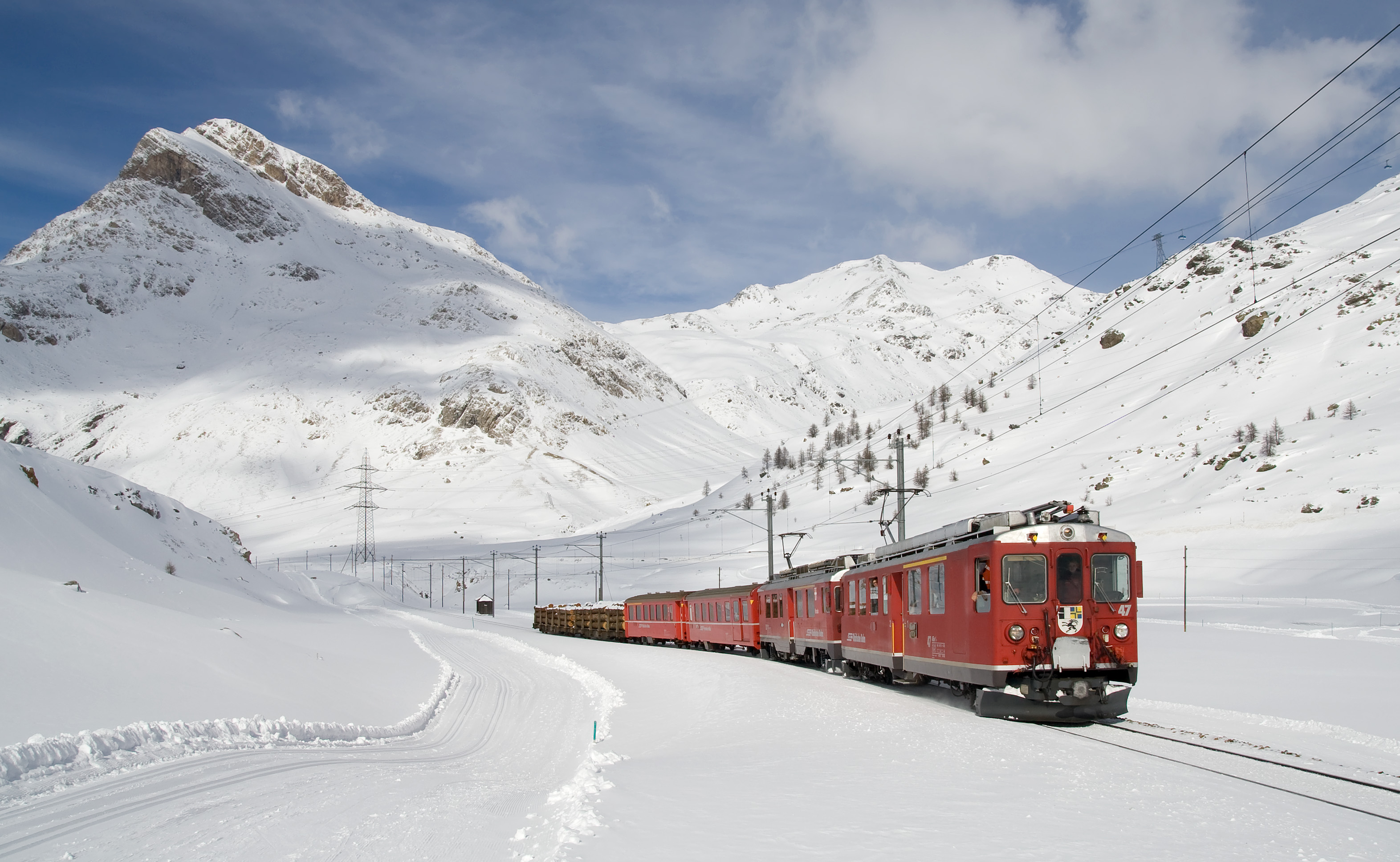
- Winter scene near the top of the Bernina Pass

Overview
- Status: Open
- Owner: Rhaetian Railway
- Locale: Engadin / Poschiavo, Graubünden, Switzerland; Valtellina, Province of Sondrio, Italy
- Termini: St. Moritz, Switzerland; Tirano, Italy
- Stations: 22
- Website: Rhaetian Railway

Service
- Type: Heavy rail
- System: Rhaetian Railway
- Services: Bernina Pass
- Operator: Rhaetian Railway
- Depot: Poschiavo

History
- Opened: 1 July 1908 / 5 July 1910

Technical
- Line length: 60.69 km (37.71 mi)
- Number of tracks: Single track with Passing loops
- Track gauge: 1,000 mm (3 ft 3 3/8 in) metre gauge
- Minimum radius: 45 m (148 ft)
- Electrification: Overhead catenary, 1,000 V DC
- Highest elevation: 2,253 m (7,392 ft) above sea level
- Maximum incline: 7%

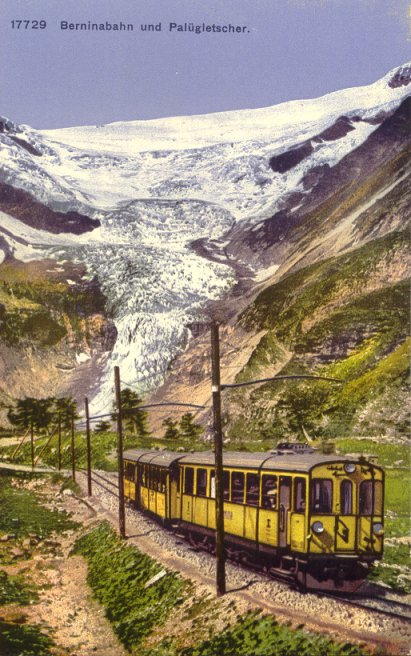
Bernina railway line with the Palü Glacier in the background. Postcard from ca. 1910

In the year following the completion of the Albula railway line in 1904, the Bernina-Bahngesellschaft (BB) was established, with the objective of opening a railway line between St Moritz and Tirano, via the Bernina Pass. Two requirements drove the planning; the need for access to hydro-electric plants on the south side of the Bernina pass, and the provision of access for tourists to tourist attractions of the high mountain area. The concession for the line was obtained in 1906, and the construction was financed by the investors in Kraftwerke Brusio AG, the builders of the hydro-electric works, without the aid of cantonal subsidy.

The line opened from 1908 (118 years ago) onwards, in several sections: on 1 July 1908 between Pontresina and Morteratsch, and between Tirano and Poschiavo; on 18 August of the same year between Pontresina and Celerina; and on 1 July 1909 between Celerina and St Moritz, and between Morteratsch and Bernina Suot. It was only on 5 July 1910 that the whole line could be opened, upon completion of the most difficult section between Bernina Suot and Poschiavo. The line was electrically operated with DC current from the start. In 1935 the voltage was increased from 750 to 1000 volts.

Originally, the Bernina line was intended for use only in summer, but in 1913/14 the BB commenced winter operations as well. This development was associated with major weather-related problems, necessitating further erection of avalanche barriers.

In the first years of its existence, the BB was always on the verge of bankruptcy. The costs of construction expenditure on the line to 1915 amounted to around 15 million Swiss francs. Even the introduction of a restaurant car in 1928, and packages for tourists, could not save the little railway company from ruin. Due to its difficult financial situation, it was taken over by the Rhaetian Railway in 1943.

The RhB modernised the line fundamentally, also for military reasons, and completely renewed the section at the top of the pass. Previously, the line formation on the north ramp of the Bernina Pass had been laid out in curves giving passengers extensive views, but also lying in the path of avalanche courses. The new parts of the line cut off those curves, the catenary and the flat bottomed rails of the old formation were removed, but the substructure is still visible in the high mountains.

Since the mid-1980s, the Rhaetian Railway has been marketing the natural and technical attractions of the Bernina line specifically to tourists. Thus, the section from Pontresina to Tirano forms part of the route of the Bernina Express. In October 2011, it was the first railway line in the world to be photographed and put on Google Street View.

== Description of the railway ==
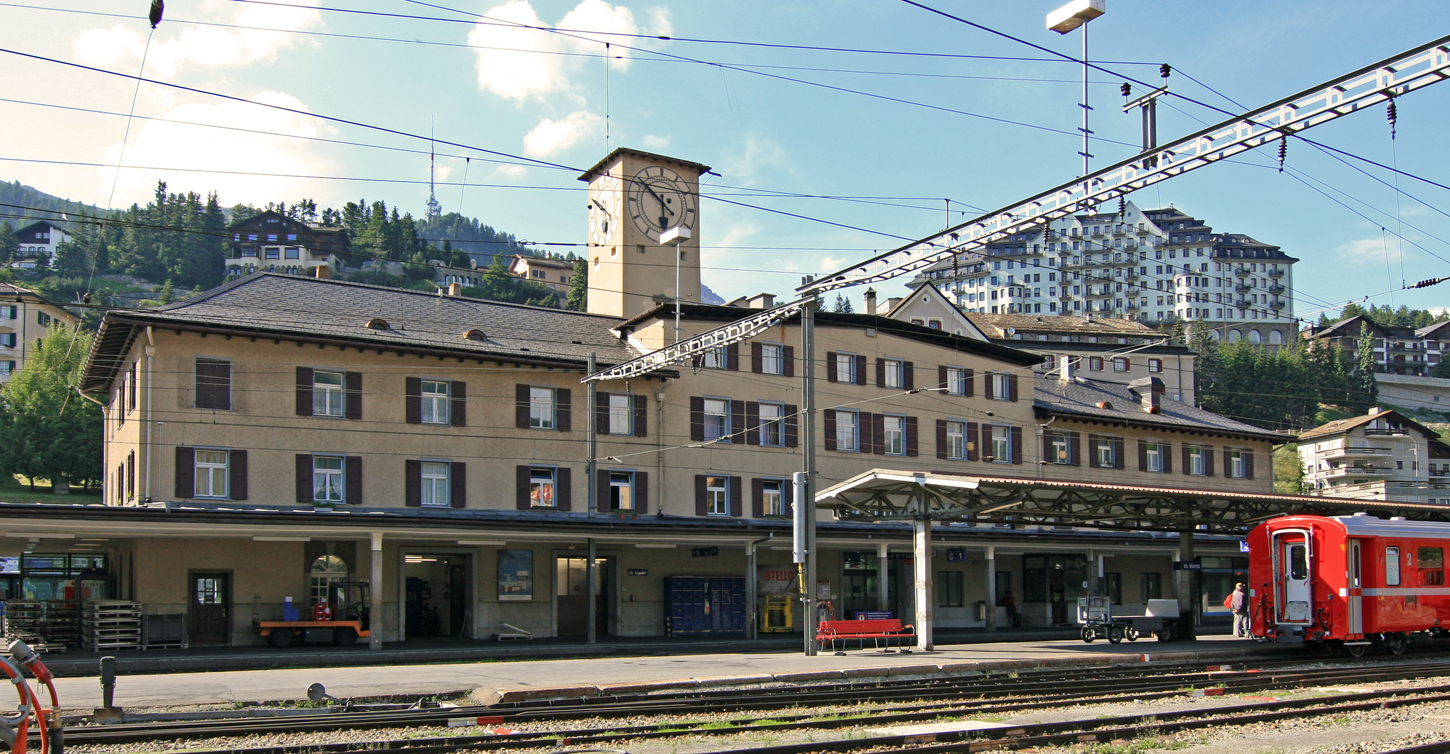
St Moritz station

St Moritz is the terminus of both the Albula line and the Bernina line. As the two lines are powered by different electrification systems, they meet at the same station, but operate on separate lines from separate platforms. The Bernina line leaves St Moritz station in an easterly direction, and crosses the Inn River on a 64 m (210 ft) long viaduct. It then passes through the 689 m (2,260 ft) long Charnadüra-Tunnel II, the longest tunnel on the entire route. The next station, Celerina Staz, is, at 1,716 m (5,630 ft) above sea level, the lowest point on the north side of the Bernina Pass. From there until Ospizio Bernina, the line will now climb almost continuously. After returning to the banks of the Inn, the line reaches the small station Punt Muragl Staz. At this point is the valley station of Muottas-Muragl-Bahn, the funicular to Muottas Muragl, opened in 1907.

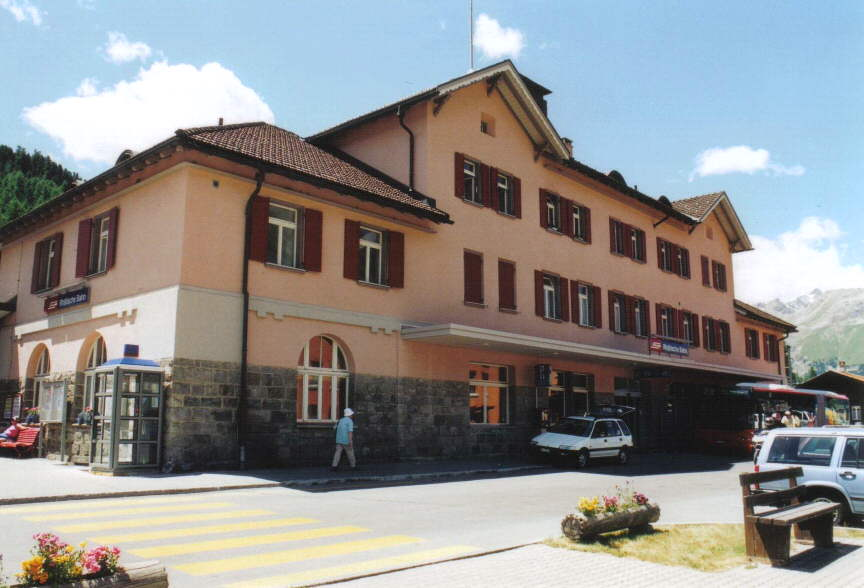
Pontresina station

The next station in Pontresina represents, together with St Moritz station, a curiosity in the network of the RhB: two completely different electrification systems meet here. The 11 kV AC powered trains, which enter the station on the line from Samedan, use tracks 1 to 3, while the 1,000 V DC powered Bernina trains use tracks 3 to 7. Track 3 has a catenary that can be switched from alternating current to direct current, and a special signal to display to train crews the type of current being used. By means of track 3, the trains using the core network (from Samedan) and the Bernina line trains can use the same line, despite their differing electrification systems. On track 3 is also the exchange of locomotives for the famous Bernina Express, which operates between Chur or Davos Platz and Tirano.

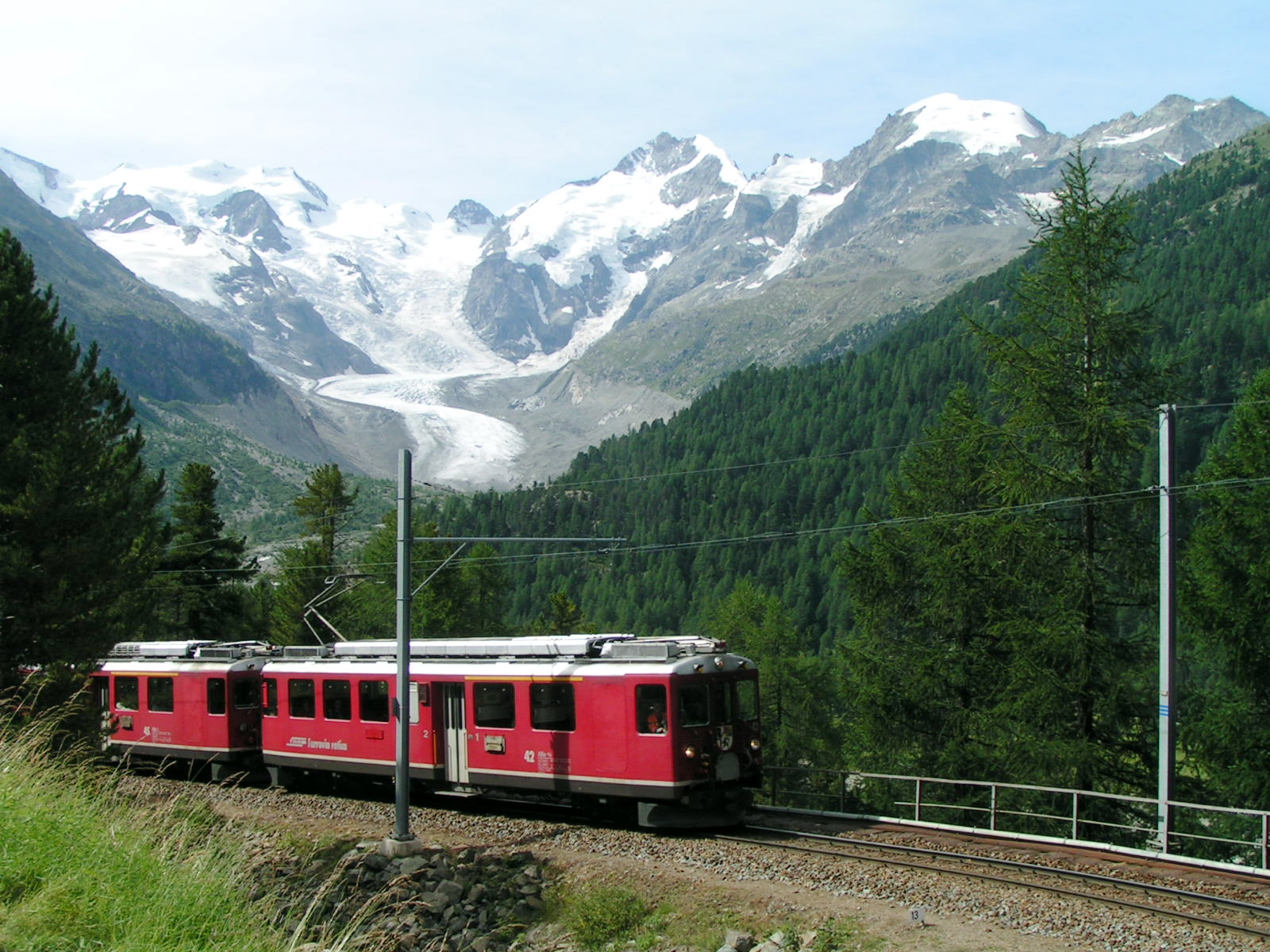
At "Montebello Curve" railway crossing

The line now turns to the south east. After crossing the Rosegbach, passing through the Surovas station (which was previously called "Sans Souci" (Carefree)), and crossing the Berninabach, it reaches Morteratsch station, about 2 km (1.2 mi) below the Morteratsch Glacier. Past the other end of the station is the world-famous Montebello Curve, where the line meets the road over the pass. The line and the road will now accompany each other as far as Ospizio Bernina. At the recently modernised Bernina Suot passing loop, the tree line has already been reached. The next stations are Diavolezza and Bernina Lagalb; both are departure points of cableways.

The next section is probably the most interesting on the north side of the pass. Here, the route is very winding, and moves from one side of the valley to the other. First, the Berninabach is crossed, using the 37 m (121 ft) long Lower Berninabach Bridge, and then the line crosses the Arlasbach, a tributary of the Berninabach. On the Upper Berninabach Bridge, the line moves back to the eastern side of the valley. Southwest of here, the Piz Bernina and the Piz Palü rise majestically. Next follows the 175 m (574 ft) long Arlas Gallery, which provides protection against snow drifts. On the southwestern side are the small lakes known as Lej Pitschen and Lej Nair. Directly behind them towers the 15 m (49 ft) high and 283 m (928 ft) long Lago Bianco dam, which also marks the watershed between the Danube and the Po.

The railway now runs along the eastern bank of the lake, and, near Ospizio Bernina, reaches its highest point, at 2,253 m (7,392 ft) above sea level. The Bernina line is thereby (mountainside railways excluded) the highest railway line in the Alps, operating as a public railway with year-round traffic. As the section from here to Poschiavo is particularly badly affected by drifting snow, countless engineering structures have been erected from the southern dam wall onwards: the 140 m (460 ft) long Scala Gallery, the 192 m (630 ft) long Scala Tunnel, the Sassal Mason Gallery, even longer at 348 m (1,142 ft), and the 54 m (177 ft) long Drago Tunnel.

After the Grüm Gallery, the attractive Alp Grüm station is reached. It not only is located at the tree line, but also marks the last station before the Italian linguistic border. From here onwards, the line clambers, with a gradient of up to 7%, and via multiple s-bends, downwards into the Poschiavo valley. That this occurs without the assistance of a rack railway system makes the Bernina line one of the steepest adhesion railways in the world.

Immediately behind the Alp Grüm station, the line winds in a tight 180° bend, and passes below Alp Grüm through the Upper Palü Gallery. In a further 180° bend, it heads through the Palü Tunnel and subsequently through the Lower Palü Gallery. A further four half circle loops follow, until the line reaches the Cavaglia station. Since about 2000, there has also been a new automatic passing loop, Stablini, between Alp Grüm and Cavaglia. It bisects a portion of the line that was previously prone to traffic delays. In zigzag fashion, the line continues from Cavaglia further down into the valley via Cadera to the former station of Privilasco. From there, the line leaves the tight bends behind, and, still at its maximum gradient, reaches the Poschiavo Valley. In Poschiavo it meets up once again with the Bernina Pass road.

At the request of the Poschiavo community, the station at Poschiavo was built just outside the village boundaries. It has a railway depot and workshop, in which a few historic railcars of the Bernina line are also stored. The remaining section of line of approximately 17 km (11 mi) to Tirano are laid partially still as a mountain railway, but also partially in the manner of a tramway system. After the stopping point Li Curt, erected only in 1977, the line ends up running on a street in the village of Le Prese. Between Le Prese and Miralago the line passes along the banks of the Poschiavo Lake, thus remaining at the lake's altitude of 965 m (3,166 ft) above sea level.

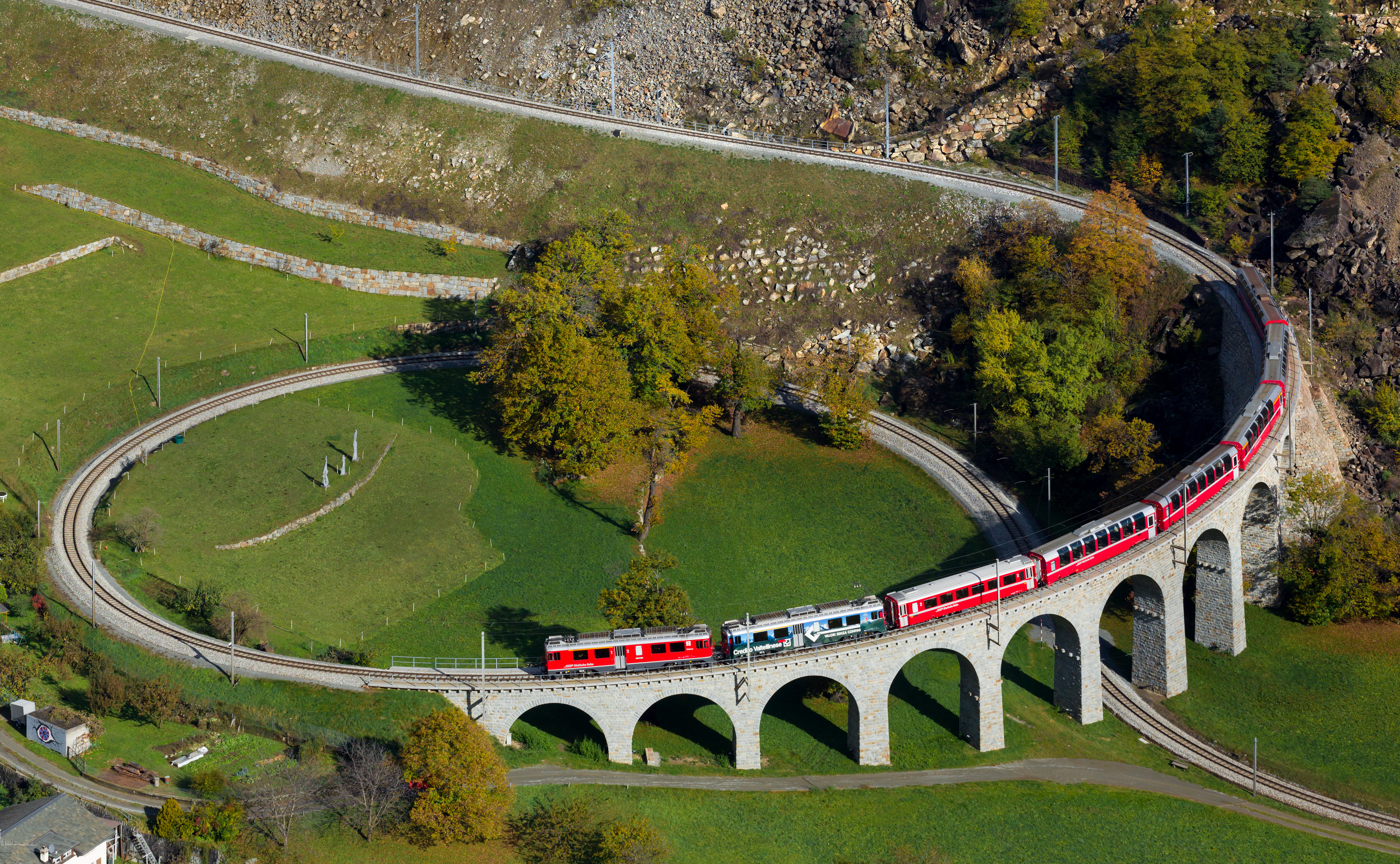
Brusio spiral viaduct

Slope diagram of the Bernina line

Below Brusio, the railway has, as its last highlight, the Brusio spiral viaduct, which serves only to adjust the altitude of the line. The spiral viaduct is followed by the stopping point for the village of Campascio, which still belongs to Brusio. Beyond the border station of Campocologno, which is unusually large due to its customs facilities, the line reaches Italy, and, after crossing the main square of Madonna di Tirano, it reaches its terminal station Tirano. Here, the Bernina line meets the standard gauge station and line of the Italian state rail infrastructure company Rete Ferroviaria Italiana (RFI), which links Tirano through Valtellina to Milan.

== Rolling stock and traffic ==
Today, the following classes of railcar and locomotive are used in scheduled commercial services on the Bernina line: fifteen ABe 8/12^{I} starting service in 2010, to replace the old series of engines, such as four ABe 4/4^{I} and nine ABe 4/4^{II}. Still in service also six ABe 4/4^{III} and two Gem 4/4 that can operate without electrical feeding, thanks their diesel-generator inside (double engine locomotives).

This fleet, consisting of railcars, also has freight cars. Some freight cars are added to passenger trains until the maximum towing capacity of such trains of 140 tonnes (138 long tons; 154 short tons) is reached. For reasons of safety, due to the presence of dangerous goods, other freight cars are operated in pure freight trains. Despite being set up originally only for tourist traffic, the Bernina line now also assists trade with Italy by carrying considerable quantities of freight, consisting mostly of heating oil, fuels and timber. Additionally, the regional shopping businesses of the Poschiavo valley are served partly by rail.

The timetable is tightly designed, with year-round services of one passenger train per hour in each direction. The flagship services are the now fully panorama car-equipped Bernina Express and the Trenino Rosso travelling in the opposite direction.

In winter, an old 1913 steam rotary snowplow is regularly in service, but also two electrical rotary snowplows from 1968 and also two modern engines from 2010 are used as well. Their operation is also a tourist attraction that draws in railway enthusiasts from all over the world, especially for the steam one. The two Gem 4/4 assure the shunt of the rotary snowplow.

In connection with the danger of avalanches on the Bernina line, the Rhaetian Railway has developed an unusual procedure for the removal of these high alpine hazards. In late winter, when the risk of avalanche is greatest, artillery is fired at the points of origin of avalanches, to bring some control to their occurrence.
