= Celerina seyrigii =

Scientific classification
- Kingdom: Plantae
- Clade: Tracheophytes
- Clade: Angiosperms
- Clade: Eudicots
- Clade: Asterids
- Order: Lamiales
- Family: Acanthaceae
- Genus: Celerina; Benoist (1964)
- Species: C. seyrigii

Binomial name
- Celerina seyrigii Benoist (1964)

Varieties
- Celerina seyrigii var. egena Benoist; Celerina seyrigii var. seyrigii

Species of flowering plant

Celerina seyrigii is a species of flowering plant in the family Acanthaceae. It is endemic to southern Madagascar. It is the sole species in genus Celerina.

Two varieties are accepted:

- Celerina seyrigii var. egena Benoist
- Celerina seyrigii var. seyrigii
