= Celerina (see) =

Latin Catholic titular see in North Africa

Celerina is an Ancient city, former bishopric and present Latin Catholic titular see in North Africa.

It's presumably located near Guebeur-Bou-Aoun, in modern Algeria.

== History ==
The city was important enough in the Roman province of Numidia to become a suffragan bishopric of the capital's Metropolitan Archbishop. However it faded, presumably under Islam.

== Titular see ==
The diocese was nominally restored in 1933 as a titular bishopric.

It has had the following incumbents, all of the lowest (episcopal) rank :

- Georges-Louis Mercier, White Fathers (M. Afr.) (1948.06.21 – 1955.09.14)
- Luís Victor Sartori (1956.01.10 – 1960.09.14)
- Karl Gnädinger (1960.11.05 – 1995.03.12)
- Marko Sopi (1995.11.02 – 2006.01.11)
- Athanasius Schneider, Crosier Canons (O.R.C.) (2006.04.08 – ...), Auxiliary Bishop of Mary Most Holy in Astana (Kazakhstan)

== See also ==
- Catholic Church in Algeria
