= Celerina railway station =

Railway station in canton of Graubünden, Switzerland

Celerina
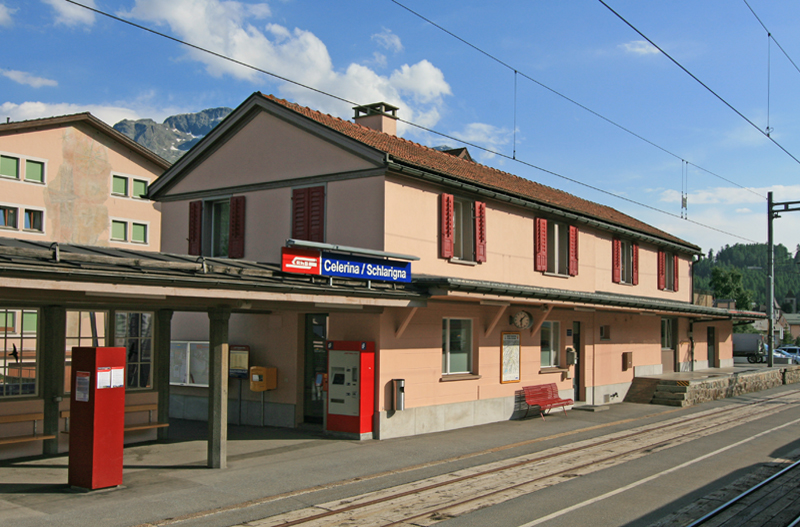
- The station building in 2008

General information
- Location: Plazza de la Staziun; Celerina/Schlarigna; Switzerland
- Coordinates: 46°30′50″N 9°51′30″E
- Elevation: 1,729 m (5,673 ft)
- Owner: Rhaetian Railway
- Line: Albula line
- Distance: 100.3 km (62.3 mi) from Landquart
- Train operators: Rhaetian Railway
- Connections: Engadin Bus

Other information
- Fare zone: 10 (Engadin Mobil)

History
- Opened: 1 July 1903

Passengers
- 2018: 320 per weekday

Services
Preceding station	Rhaetian Railway	Following station
St. Moritz Terminus	IR 38	Samedan towards Chur
St. Moritz Terminus	RE 3	Samedan towards Landquart
Location

Celerina railway station is a railway station in the municipality of Celerina/Schlarigna, in the Swiss canton of Graubünden. Half-hourly services operate on this section of the line. Another station, Celerina Staz, is located roughly 900 metres (3,000 ft) to the south on the far side of the Inn.

== Services ==
As of the December 2023 timetable change, the following services stop at Celerina:

- InterRegio: hourly service between Chur and St. Moritz.
- RegioExpress: hourly service between Landquart and St. Moritz.
