= St. Moritz railway station =

Railway station in Switzerland

St. Moritz
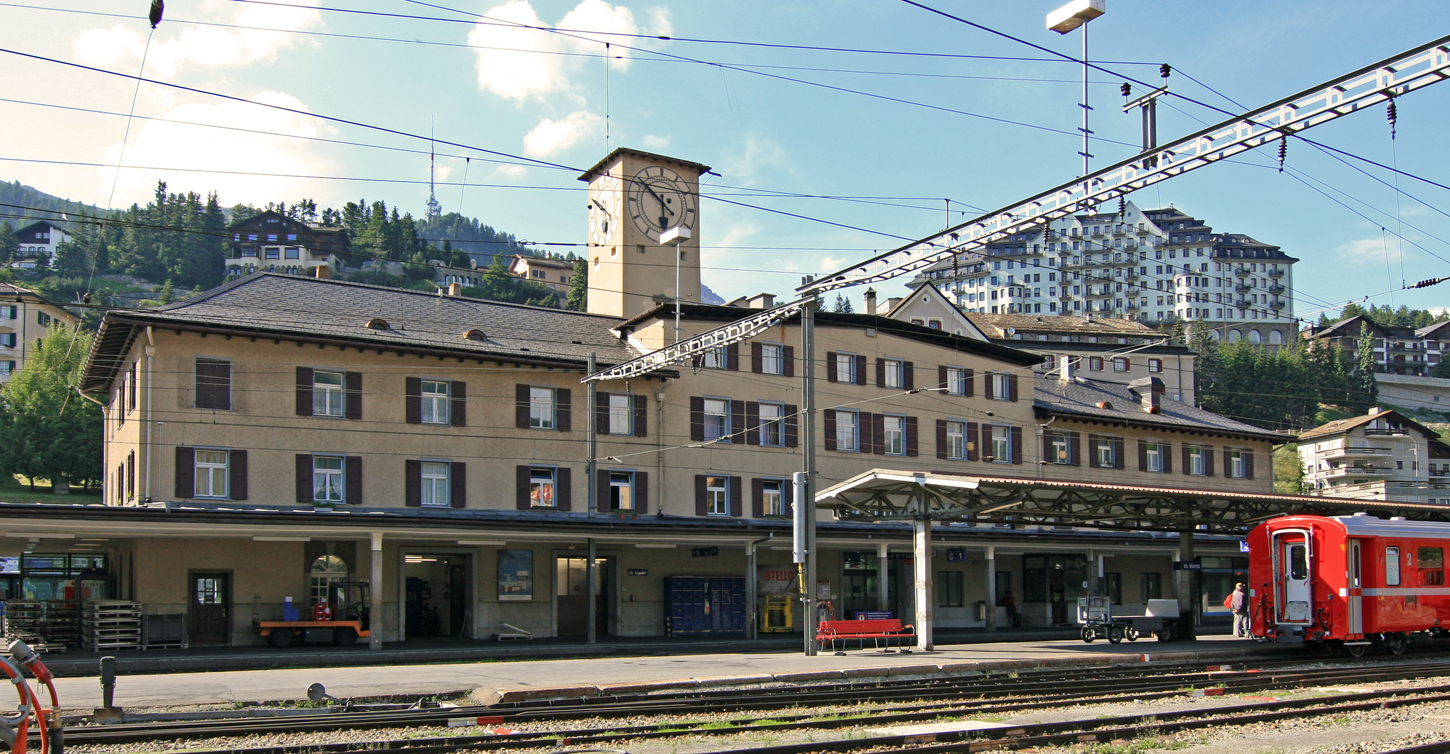
- The station building in 2008

General information
- Location: Via Grevas; St. Moritz; Switzerland
- Coordinates: 46°29′53″N 9°50′47″E
- Elevation: 1,775 m (5,823 ft)
- Owner: Rhaetian Railway
- Lines: Albula line; Bernina line
- Distance: 100.3 km (62.3 mi) from Landquart
- Platforms: 5
- Train operators: Glacier Express; Rhaetian Railway
- Connections: PostAuto Schweiz and Engadin Bus

Other information
- IATA code: ZKH
- Fare zone: 10 (Engadin Mobil)

History
- Opened: 10 July 1904

Passengers
- 2018: 3,300 per weekday

Services
| Preceding station | Rhaetian Railway | Following station |
|---|---|---|
| Terminus | Bernina Express | Pontresina towards Tirano |
| Terminus | IR 38 | Celerina towards Chur |
| Terminus | RE 3 | Celerina towards Landquart |
| Terminus | RE 9 | Celerina Staz towards Tirano |
| Terminus | R 19 | Celerina Staz towards Tirano |
| Preceding station | Glacier Express | Following station |
| Terminus | Glacier Express | Samedan towards Zermatt |
Location

St. Moritz railway station is a railway station in the resort town of St. Moritz, in the Swiss canton of Graubünden. It is the southern terminus of the Albula Railway line from Chur, and a northern terminus for the Bernina Railway line from Tirano in Italy. The station also serves as a terminus for local bus and Postbus services.

Hourly services operate on both the Albula and Bernina lines. Because these two lines operate with different types and levels of power supply, St Moritz is also a "power supply switch" station (Systemwechselbahnhof).

The station is located at a height of 1,775 m (5,823 ft) above sea level and is the highest urban railway station in Switzerland.

== History ==
The station came into operation in 1904. At this time St Moritz had already had its own electric tram service, Strassenbahn St. Moritz, since 1896 and there were plans to build a branch line to link the tram service to the new station. For financial reasons the short linking branch line was never built. In August 2017 a rebuild of the station was completed.

== Services ==
As of the December 2023 timetable change, the following services stop at St. Moritz:

- Glacier Express: Several round-trips per day to Zermatt.
- Bernina Express: Up to three round-trips per day to Tirano.
- InterRegio: hourly service to Chur.
- RegioExpress / Regio: hourly service to Landquart and Tirano.

== Gallery ==
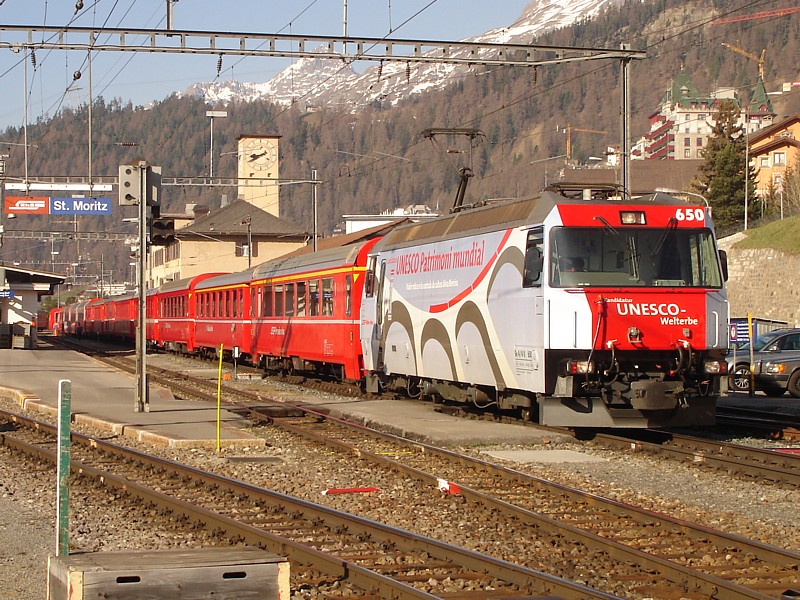
Train leaving St. Moritz.

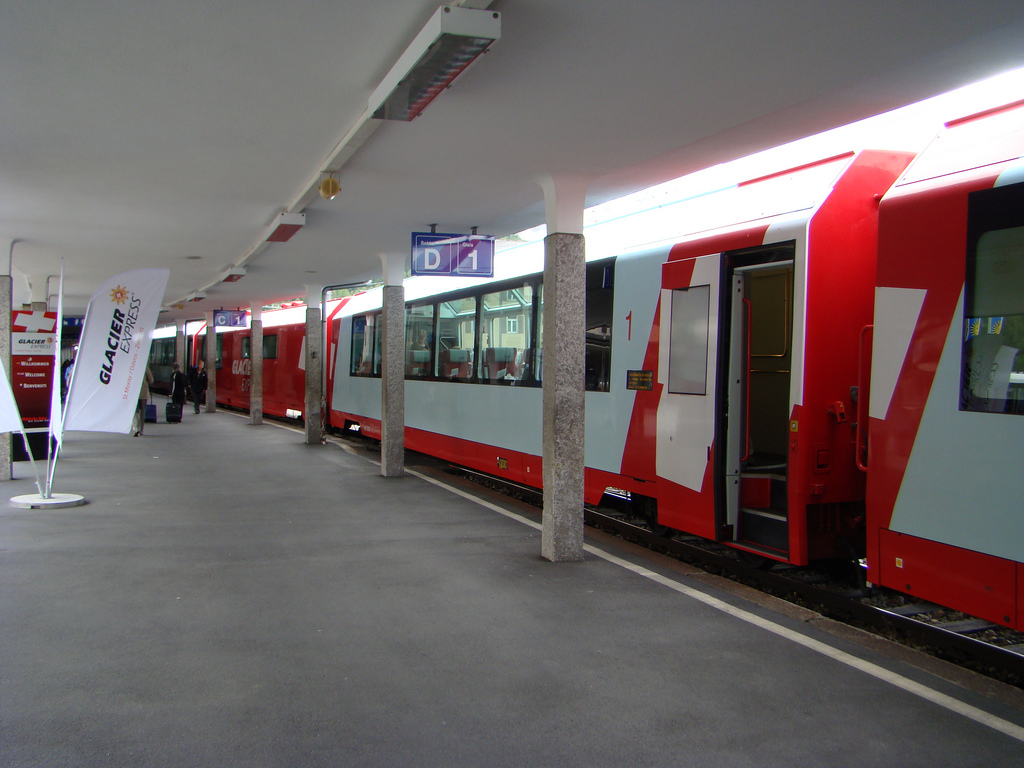
Glacier Express at platform 1 of St. Moritz.

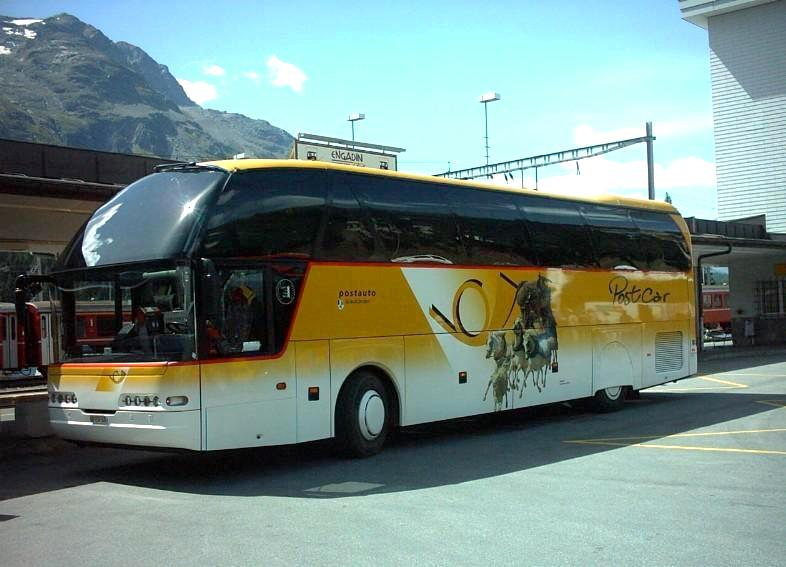
Postbus at St. Moritz station.

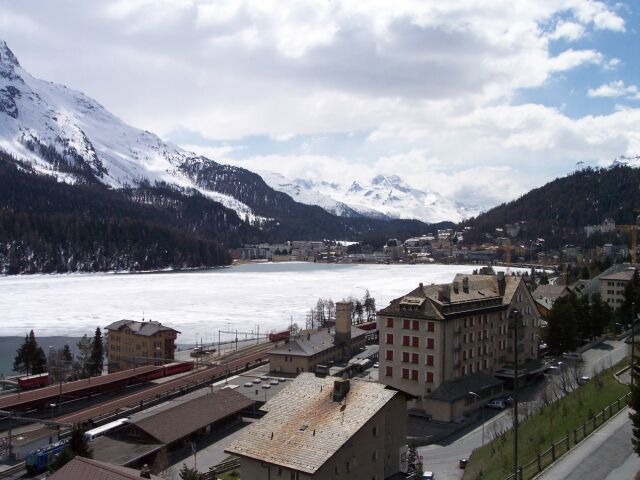
St. Moritz station from above.

== See also ==
- Rail transport in Switzerland
