= Tirano railway station (RhB) =

Railway station of the Rhaetian Railway in Italy

Tirano
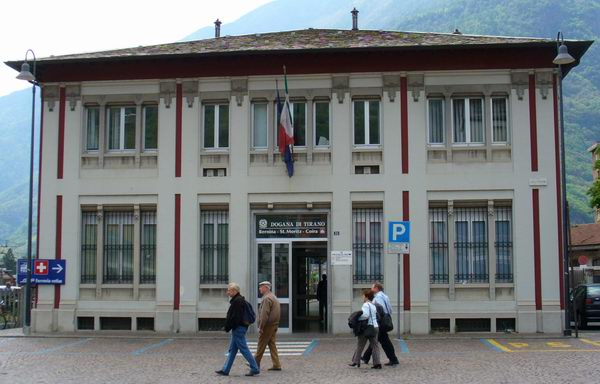
- The station building in 2005

General information
- Location: Piazzale Stazione; Tirano; Italy
- Coordinates: 46°12′55″N 10°10′00″E
- Elevation: 429 m (1,407 ft)
- Owner: Rhaetian Railway
- Line: Bernina line
- Distance: 60.7 km (37.7 mi) from St. Moritz
- Train operators: Rhaetian Railway
- Connections: AutoPostale buses

History
- Opened: 1 July 1908

Services
Preceding station	Rhaetian Railway	Following station
Campocologno towards Chur or St. Moritz	Bernina Express	Terminus
Campocologno towards St. Moritz	RE 9	Terminus
Campocologno towards St. Moritz	R 19	Terminus
Location

Tirano railway station is one of two stations in Tirano, Italy. It is the southern terminus of the metre gauge Bernina line of the Rhaetian Railway from St. Moritz. There are hourly trains on this line. It is adjacent to the main-line Rete Ferroviaria Italiana Tirano railway station.

== Services ==
As of the December 2023 timetable change, the following trains stop at Tirano:

- Bernina Express: Several round-trips per day to Chur or St. Moritz.
- Regio: hourly service to St. Moritz.

== Gallery ==
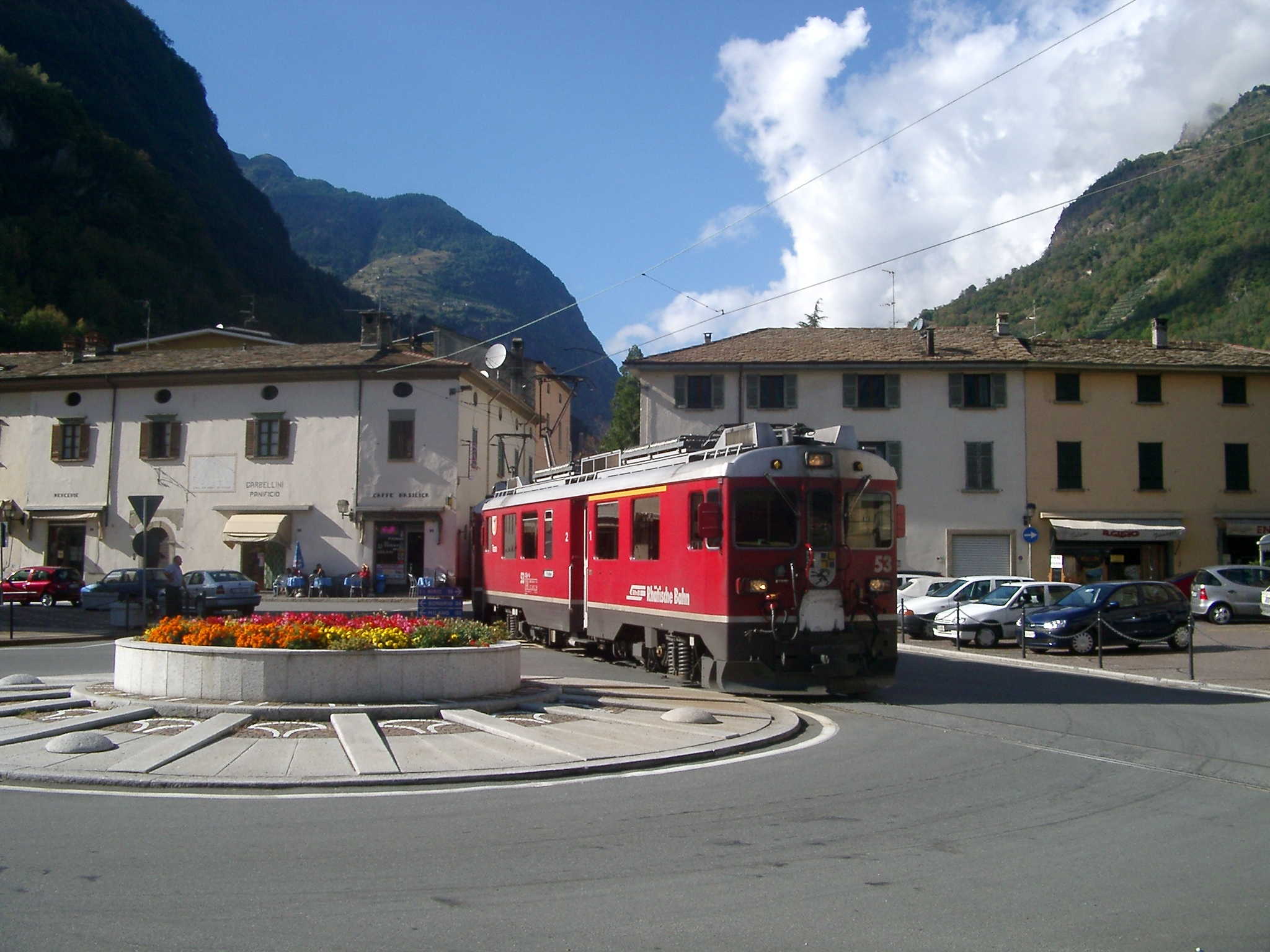
Train through Tirano

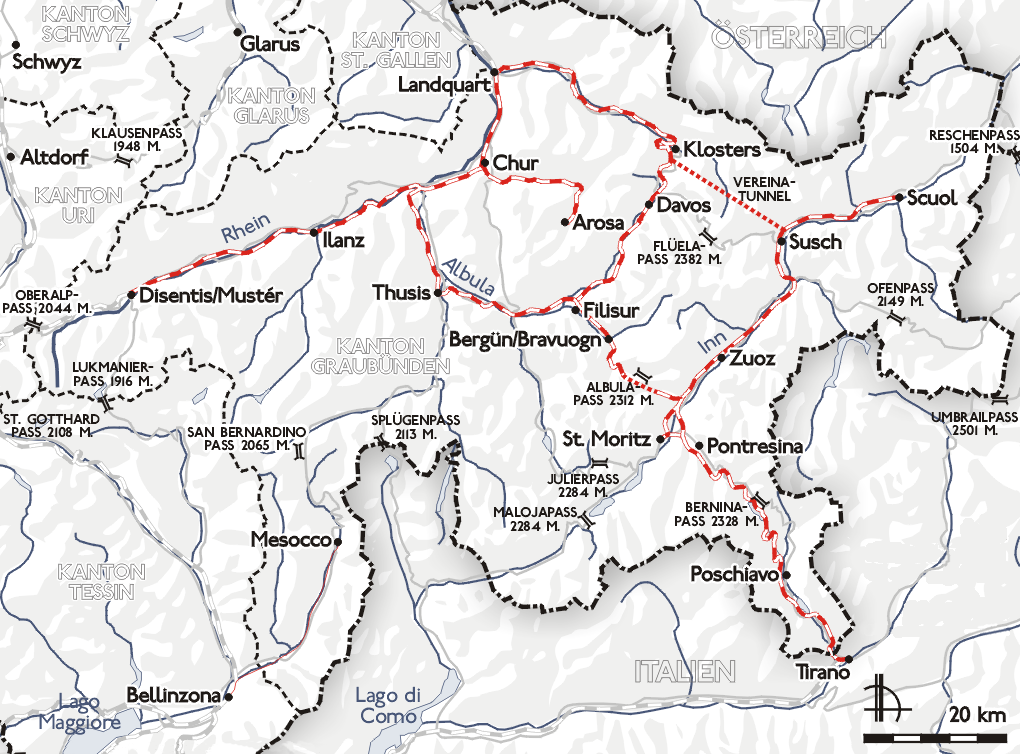
Tirano as shown on the RhB network
