= Bernina-Bahngesellschaft Fe 2/2 51 =

Bernina-Bahngesellschaft Fe 2/2 51 Rhaetian Railway Fe 2/2 51 Rhaetian Railway De 2/2 151
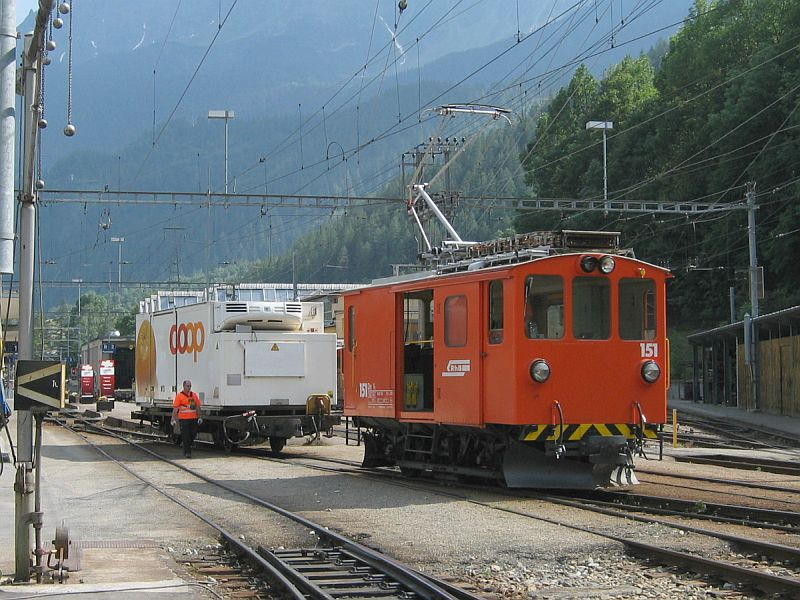
- RhB De 2/2 151 in Poschiavo.
- Manufacturer: SIG, Alioth
- Constructed: 1909
- Number built: 1
- Number in service: 1
- Fleet numbers: 51 (to 1965); 151 (since 1965)
- Operators: Bernina-Bahngesellschaft (to 1943); Rhaetian Railway (since 1943)
- Lines served: Bernina Railway

Specifications
- Car length: 7,150 mm (23 ft 5 1/2 in)
- Width: 2,500 mm (8 ft 2 3/8 in)
- Maximum speed: 45 km/h (28 mph)
- Weight: 13 tonnes (13 long tons; 14 short tons) (empty); 15.5 tonnes (34,200 lb) (service)
- Power output: 154 kW (210 hp)
- Tractive effort: 24.5 kN (5,510 lbf)
- Electric system(s): 750 V DC (to 1935); 1,000 V DC (since 1935) Overhead
- Current collector(s): Pantograph
- UIC classification: Bo′
- Track gauge: 1,000 mm (3 ft 3 3/8 in) metre gauge

The Bernina-Bahngesellschaft Fe 2/2 51, later known as the Rhaetian Railway Fe 2/2 51, and reclassified in 1965 as De 4/4 151, is a metre gauge baggage railcar currently operated by the Rhaetian Railway (RhB), the main railway network in the Canton of Graubünden, Switzerland.

The railcar has been so named under the Swiss locomotive and railcar classification system. According to that system, Fe 2/2 (to 1961) and De 2/2 (since 1962) denote a vehicle with a luggage compartment and a total of two axles, both of them drive axles.

== Entry into service ==
In 1909, the then independent Bernina-Bahngesellschaft (BB) placed the railcar into service on the Bernina Railway. Constructed by SIG and Alioth, it was originally classified as Fe^{2} 51.

In 1943, the railcar entered service with the Rhaetian Railway, upon that railway's takeover of the BB. The railcar has continued to operate on the Bernina Railway ever since the takeover.

== Specifications ==
=== As delivered ===
The railcar's original timber bodywork gave it the external appearance of a goods wagon. Its electrical equipment corresponded to that of a "halved" passenger carrying railcar of class BCe ^{4}.

=== Modifications ===
Over time, the Rhaetian Railway altered a number of the railcar's specifications:

- 1951: the bow collector was replaced by a double-arm pantograph;
- 1961–62: the railcar was fitted with a new body, new controller box, and a compressed air shunting brake and track brake in addition to the existing vacuum brake;
- 1980: the body was clad in metal, and the pantograph was replaced by a single-arm unit.

== Livery ==
While in service with the BB, the railcar was painted grey. After the Rhaetian Railway takeover, it was initially liveried in green and later reliveried in brown. Since the early 1990s, it has carried a traffic orange livery.

== Current operations ==
The railcar is currently used as a shunting locomotive – in the summer months mostly at Ospizio Bernina, and at other times in Poschiavo.
