= Rhaetian Railway ABe 4/4 III =

Swiss metre-gauge railcar class

Rhaetian Railway ABe 4/4 ^{III}
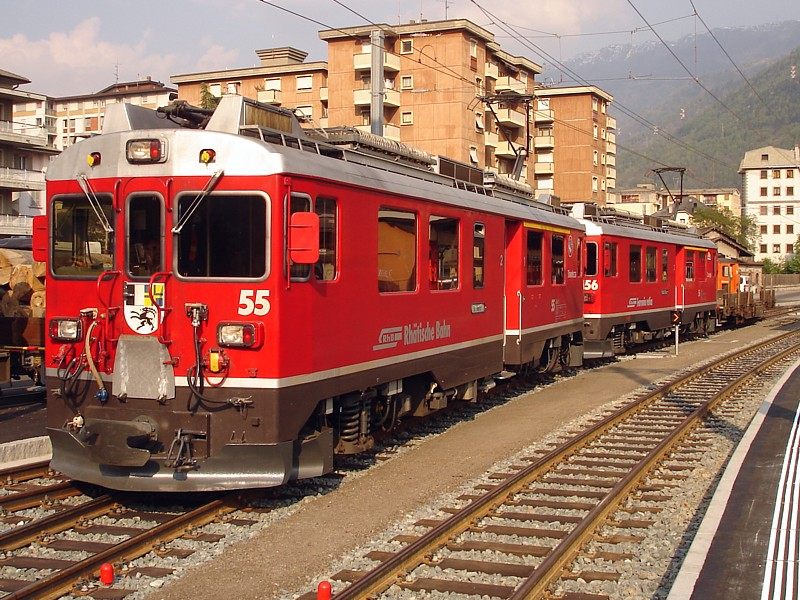
- ABe 4/4 ^{III} 55 and 56 at Tirano station.
- Manufacturer: Swiss Locomotive and Machine Works and ASEA Brown Boveri
- Constructed: 1988–1990
- Number built: 6
- Number in service: 0
- Number preserved: 2
- Number scrapped: 3
- Operators: Rhaetian Railway
- Lines served: Bernina Railway

Specifications
- Car length: 16,886 mm (55 ft 5 in)
- Width: 2,650 mm (8 ft 8 in)
- Maximum speed: 65 km/h (40 mph)
- Weight: 47 t (46.3 long tons; 51.8 short tons)
- Power output: 1,016 kW (1,360 hp)
- Electric system(s): 1000 V DC Overhead
- Current collection: Pantograph
- UIC classification: Bo′Bo′
- Track gauge: 1,000 mm (3 ft 3 3/8 in) metre gauge

The Rhaetian Railway ABe 4/4 ^{III} is a class of metre gauge electric multiple unit railcars of the Rhaetian Railway (RhB), which is the main railway network in the Canton of Graubünden, Switzerland.

The class is so named because it was the third class of railcars of the Swiss locomotive and railcar classification type ABe 4/4 to be acquired by the Rhaetian Railway. According to that classification system, ABe 4/4 denotes an electric railcar with first and second class compartments and a total of four axles, all of which are drive axles.

Acquired in 1988 and 1990, the six railcars in the class are numbered 51 to 56. They operate on the 1,000 V DC powered Bernina Railway, where they have helped to cope with increasing traffic. Over the years, they have also displaced the earlier ABe 4/4 ^{I} class railcars into lower level services.

== Technical details ==
The ABe 4/4 ^{III} class was manufactured by the Swiss Locomotive and Machine Works (SLM) and ABB in two series, each of three cars. They were the first motive power on the Rhaetian Railway to use frequency changer technology together with AC induction motors. In addition, they were the world's first DC-powered railway vehicles with GTO thyristors.

Each ABe 4/4 ^{III} class railcar has a top speed of 65 kilometres per hour (40 mph) and weighs 47 tonnes (46 long tons; 52 short tons). At the time the class was delivered, it had, at 1,016 kilowatts (1,362 hp), the highest hourly power output of any Rhaetian Railway DC motive power. The class's towing capacity is 90 tonnes (89 long tons; 99 short tons) at a gradient of 7%, and 95 tonnes (93 long tons; 105 short tons) if only bogie coaches are being hauled. The ABe 4/4 IIIs are also equipped with 12 seats in first class, and 16-second class seats.

Thanks to multiple-unit train control, each individual railcar can be operated in combination with other members of the class, and also with older ABe 4/4 ^{II} class railcars, as well as Gem 4/4 class electro-diesel locomotives. Much use is made of the ABe 4/4 ^{III}s' multiple-unit control systems in the Bernina Railway's daily operations. The combined operation of two ABe 4/4 ^{III}s under multiple unit control theoretically leaves sufficient power reserves for the haulage of no more than a further 50 tonnes (49 long tons; 55 short tons), as the maximum towing capacity of 140 tonnes (140 long tons; 150 short tons) cannot be exceeded.

As of 2018, it was rumoured that one ABe 4/4 III of the first batch in 1988 is set to be preserved by Rhb Historic as part of their fleet but the number hasn't been decided upon yet.

== Livery ==
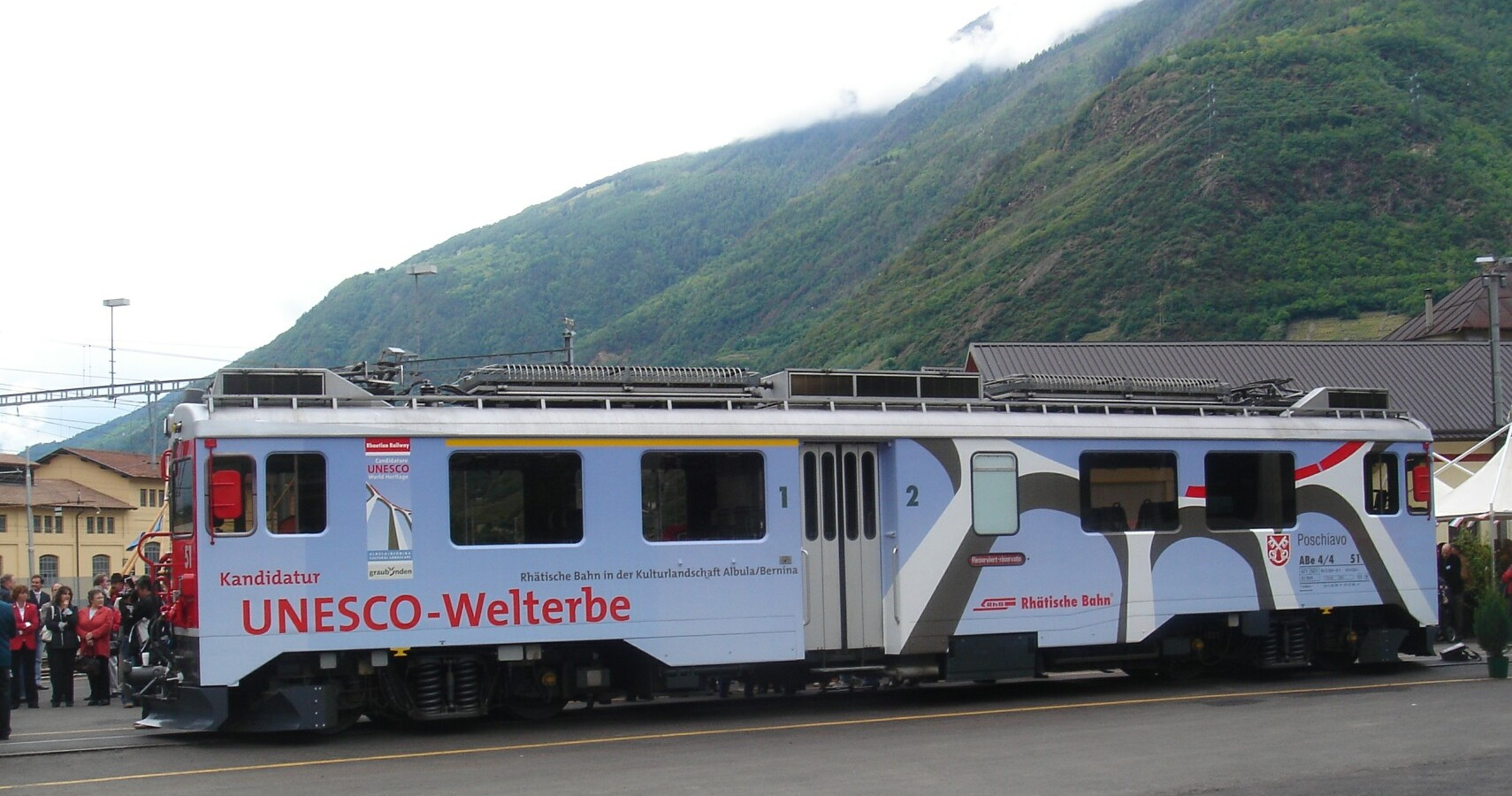
Unveiling of the special livery of ABe 4/4 51 in Tirano on 5 May 2007.

For the ABe 4/4 ^{III} class of railcars, the Rhaetian Railway chose a livery that corresponds with that of the Ge 4/4 ^{I}, Ge 4/4 ^{II} and Ge 4/4 ^{III} class electric locomotives. The dominant colour of the railcar bodies in this livery is red. Each cab front is emblazoned with a Graubünden coat of arms. Underneath a low level white coloured cheat line surrounding the railcar bodies, the chassis is dark grey. This livery was also subsequently applied to the ABe 4/4 ^{II} class railcars and the Gem 4/4 locomotives.

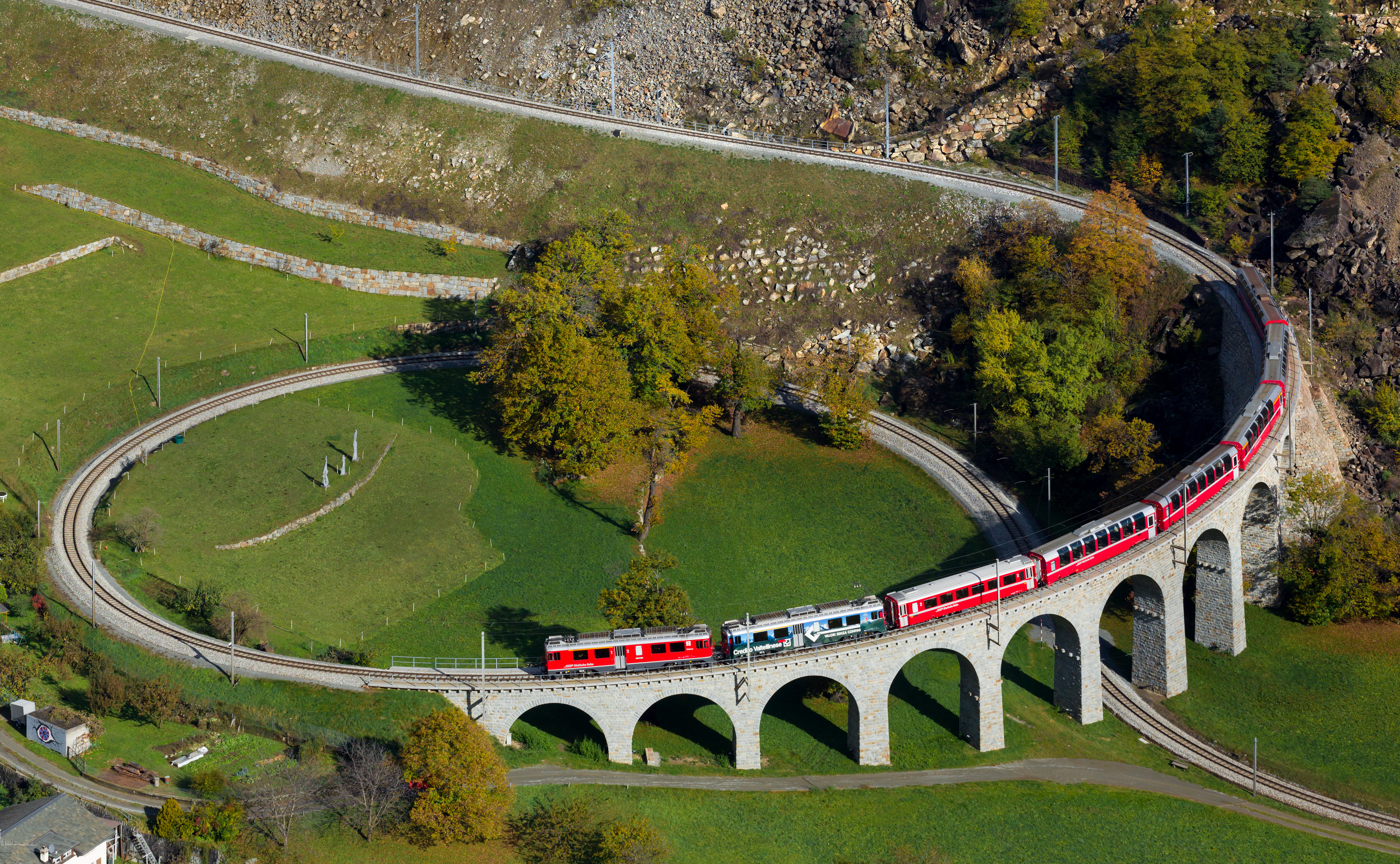
Two Rhaetian Railways ABe 4/4 III multiple units with a local train from St. Moritz to Tirano are just crossing the Brusio spiral viaduct

Apart from its traffic number, each member of the class carries the name of a community and its coat of arms.

In 2007, ABe 4/4 ^{III} no 51 received a special advertising livery publicising the subsequently successful candidature of the Rhaetian Railway in the Albula / Bernina Landscapes for inclusion in the UNESCO World Heritage List. All other members of the class have since also been painted in an advertising livery.

== List of railcars ==
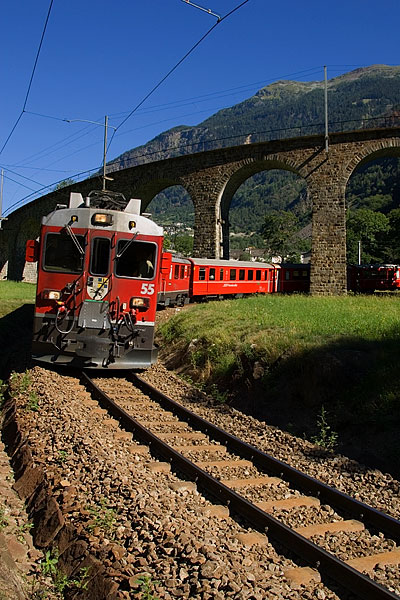
ABe 4/4 ^{III} 55 and another ABe 4/4 ^{III} pass with their train underneath the spiral viaduct at Brusio.

List of the ABe 4/4 ^{III} railcars of the Rhaetian Railway
Traffic number	Name	Commissioning	Status	Notes
51	Poschiavo	1988	scrapped	UNESCO promotional livery
52	Brusio	1988	scrapped	100 Years Bernina Railway promotional livery
53	Tirano	1988	as display	Credito Valtellinese promotional livery
54	Hakone^{1}	1990	converted	Graubündner Kantonalbank promotional livery
55	Diavolezza^{2}	1990	Scrapped	RE-Power (Rhätia Energie) promotional livery
56	Corviglia^{3}	1990	preserved	RE-Power (Rhätia Energie) promotional livery
^{1} The Japanese Hakone Tozan Railway has a friendly association with the Rhaetian Railway.^{2}Ski resort connected by the Bernina - Diavolezza Cableway with Pontresina.^{3}Part of the St. Moritz - Corviglia - Piz Nair ski resort connected by cableway with St. Moritz.

== See also ==
- Bernina Express
