= Bernina Railway Ge 6/6 81 =

Swiss electric heritage locomotive

Bernina Railway Ge 6/6 81 Rhaetian Railway Ge 4/4 181
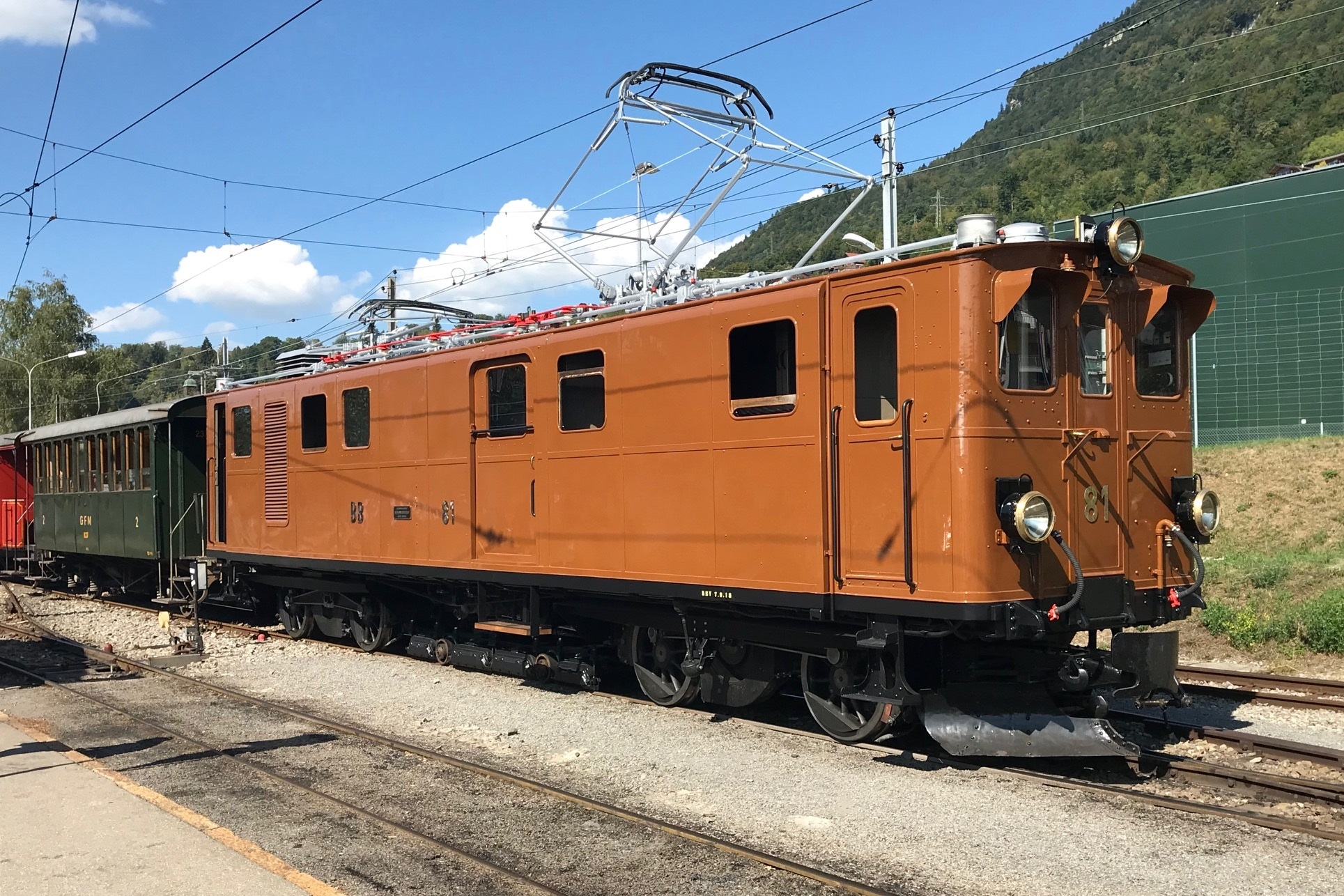
- Bernina Railway Ge 4/4 81 by Blonay–Chamby Museum Railway in 2018.
Type and origin
- Power type: Electric
- Builder: Swiss Locomotive and Machine Works and Brown, Boveri & Cie
- Build date: 1916
- Total produced: 1
Specifications
- Configuration
  - UIC: C′C′ (originally); B′B′ (after rebuild)
- Gauge: 1,000 mm (3 ft 3 3/8 in)
- Length: 13,900 mm (45 ft 7 in)
- Width: 2,500 mm (8 ft 2 in)
- Loco weight: 46.6 tonnes (45.9 long tons; 51.4 short tons)
- Electric system/s: 1000 V DC Overhead
- Current pickup(s): Pantograph
Performance figures
- Maximum speed: 45 km/h (28 mph)
- Power output: 750 V: 455 kW (610 hp); 1000 V: 705 kW (950 hp)
- Tractive effort: 750 V: 92 kN (20,680 lbf); 1000 V: 148 kN (33,270 lbf)
Career
- Operators: Bernina Railway; Rhaetian Railway
- Class: BB: Ge 6/6, Ge 4/4; RhB: Ge 4/4
- Numbers: BB: 81; RhB: 181
- Locale: Graubünden, Switzerland
- Retired: 1970
- Current owner: Blonay-Chamby Railway
- Disposition: Heritage locomotive

The Bernina Railway Ge 6/6 81, later reclassified as Ge 4/4 81, and later still known as the Rhaetian Railway Ge 4/4 181, is a 1000 V DC metre gauge electrically powered heritage locomotive made in Switzerland.

The locomotive was so named under the Swiss locomotive and railcar classification system. According to that system, Ge 6/6 denotes a narrow gauge electric locomotive with a total of six axles, all of which are drive axles, and Ge 4/4 is similarly a narrow gauge electric locomotive, but with only four axles, all of them drive axles. However, and as discussed below, neither of these names has been strictly accurate for this particular locomotive.

Whatever its correct description, the locomotive is now a heritage vehicle owned by the Blonay-Chamby Railway. This engine is now in the BC workshops, undergoing a complete overhaul, with the target of putting her back into service in 2016 latest, when she will be 100 years old.

== History ==
=== Origins as a Ge 6/6 ===
A unique vehicle, the locomotive was manufactured in 1916 by the Swiss Locomotive and Machine Works (SLM) and fitted with electrical equipment by Brown Boveri & Cie (BBC). Its original operator, the Bernina Railway, had ordered it because a rapid increase in traffic on that railway had created a need for a separate locomotive for heavy trains.

After entering service in 1916, the locomotive operated under the traffic number 81 on the Bernina Railway, between St Moritz in Switzerland and Tirano in Italy, via the Bernina Pass.

With a weight of 45 tonnes (44 long tons; 50 short tons), distributed originally between six drive axles and two small additional axles discussed below, the locomotive was considered to be the most powerful metre gauge locomotive in Europe. However, the three axle bogies with their rod drive were not effective, and caused various difficulties that were untenable in the long run. In particular, the drive rods had a habit of breaking and on one occasion, a broken drive rod even penetrated the vehicle's roof.

=== Conversion to a Ge 4/4 ===
In 1929, the Bernina Railway addressed the locomotive's reliability problem by converting it from a C-C wheel arrangement into a B-B configuration, and therefore reclassified it as a Ge 4/4 type locomotive. The conversion involved removing the central axle of each bogie, lowering the traction motors, and installing new drive rods. These measures permanently eliminated the previous operational disturbances. At the same time, power output was able to be increased from 705 kilowatts (945 hp) to 760 kilowatts (1,020 hp), but this involved lowering the top speed from 50 kilometres per hour (31 mph) to 45 kilometres per hour (28 mph).

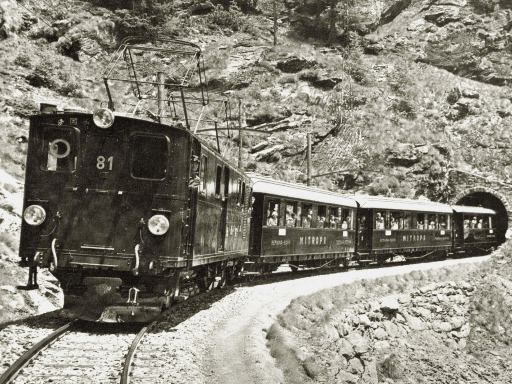
BB Ge 6/6 81 before its rebuilding as Ge 4/4 in 1928

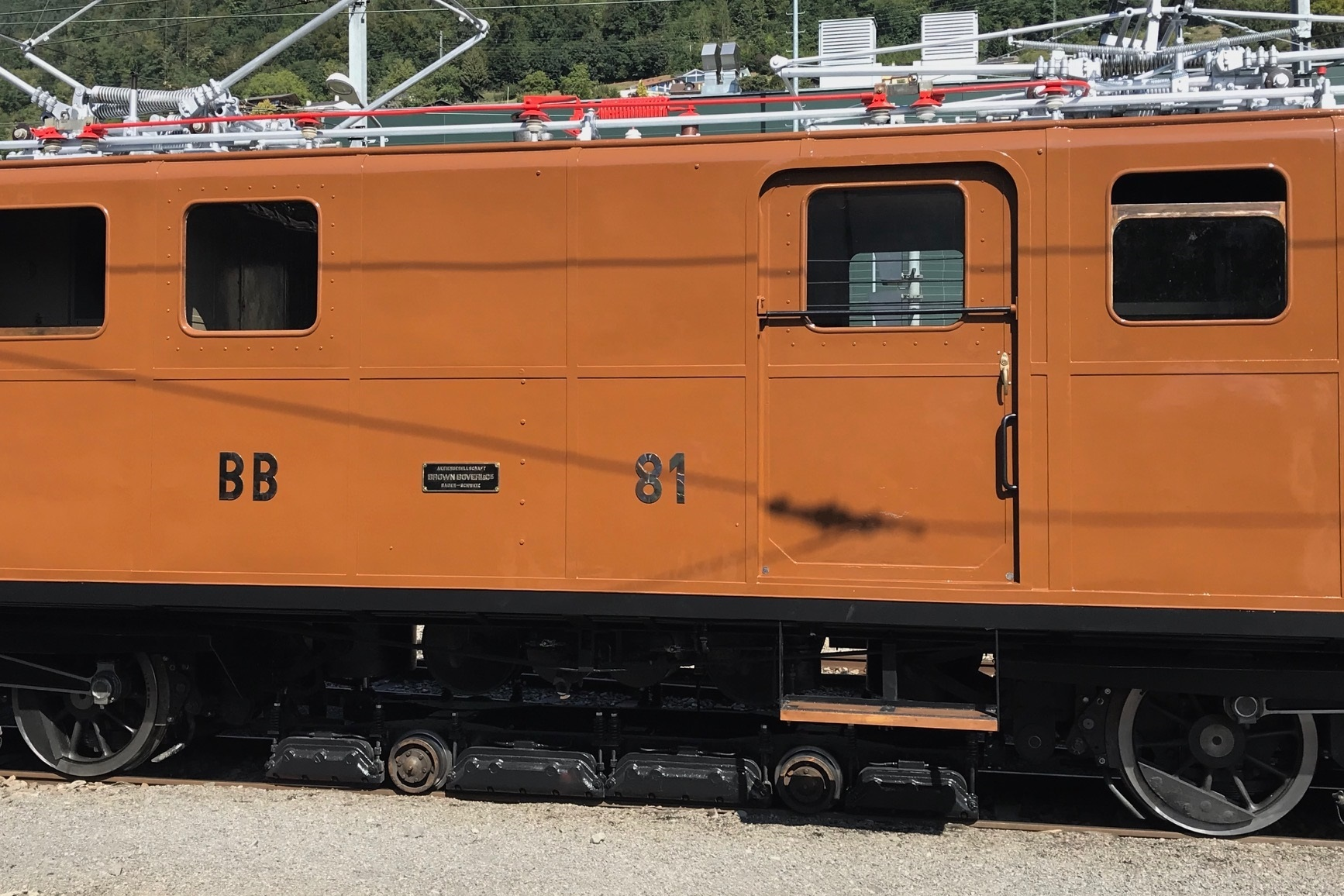
The brake frame with the electromagnetic brakes

As a special feature, the locomotive had been fitted with a two axle subframe supporting the brake frame for the electromagnetic rail brakes, which were supplied with current through the overhead catenary. Due to these subframes, the locomotive's wheel arrangement is correctly described as C′2′C′ in its original form, and B′2′B′ in its modified form. The two axle subframe, together with a small luggage compartment, has never been taken into account in the official classification of the locomotive. Strictly speaking, the locomotive should be classified as GDe 4/6 in its present configuration.

=== Later operations ===
In 1943, the previously independent Bernina Railway was taken over by the Rhaetian Railway (RhB), which is the main railway network in the Canton of Graubünden, Switzerland. At the time of the takeover, the locomotive was renumbered 181. It continued to haul trains on the Bernina Railway until its withdrawal from service in 1970.

In the same year, the locomotive was transferred to the Blonay-Chamby Railway, where it was initially used on a regular basis. As a result of damage to its electrical equipment in 1990, it was taken out of the Blonay-Chamby's operational fleet. Only in 2008, thanks to a generous sponsor, was it worked up sufficiently to be able to re-enter active service.

== Sources, further reading ==
- Belloncle, Patrick; Brünger, Gian; Grossenbacher, Rolf; Müller, Christian. Das grosse Buch der Rhätischen Bahn 1889 - 2001 (in German). ISBN 3-9522494-0-8.
- Finke, Wolfgang; Schweers, Hans. Die Fahrzeuge der Rhätischen Bahn 1889-1998 band 3: Triebfahrzeuge (in German). SCHWEERS + WALL. ISBN 3-89494-105-7.
- Jeanmarie, Claude. Die Berninabahn (in German). Verlag Eisenbahn. ISBN 3-85649-048-5.
- Jeanmaire, Claude. Die elektrischen und Dieseltriebfahrzeuge Schweizerischer Eisenbahn Die Gleichstromlinen der Rhätischen Bahn (in German). Verlag Eisenbahn. ISBN 3-85649-019-1.
