= LEB G 3/3 2 and 5 =

LEB G 3/3
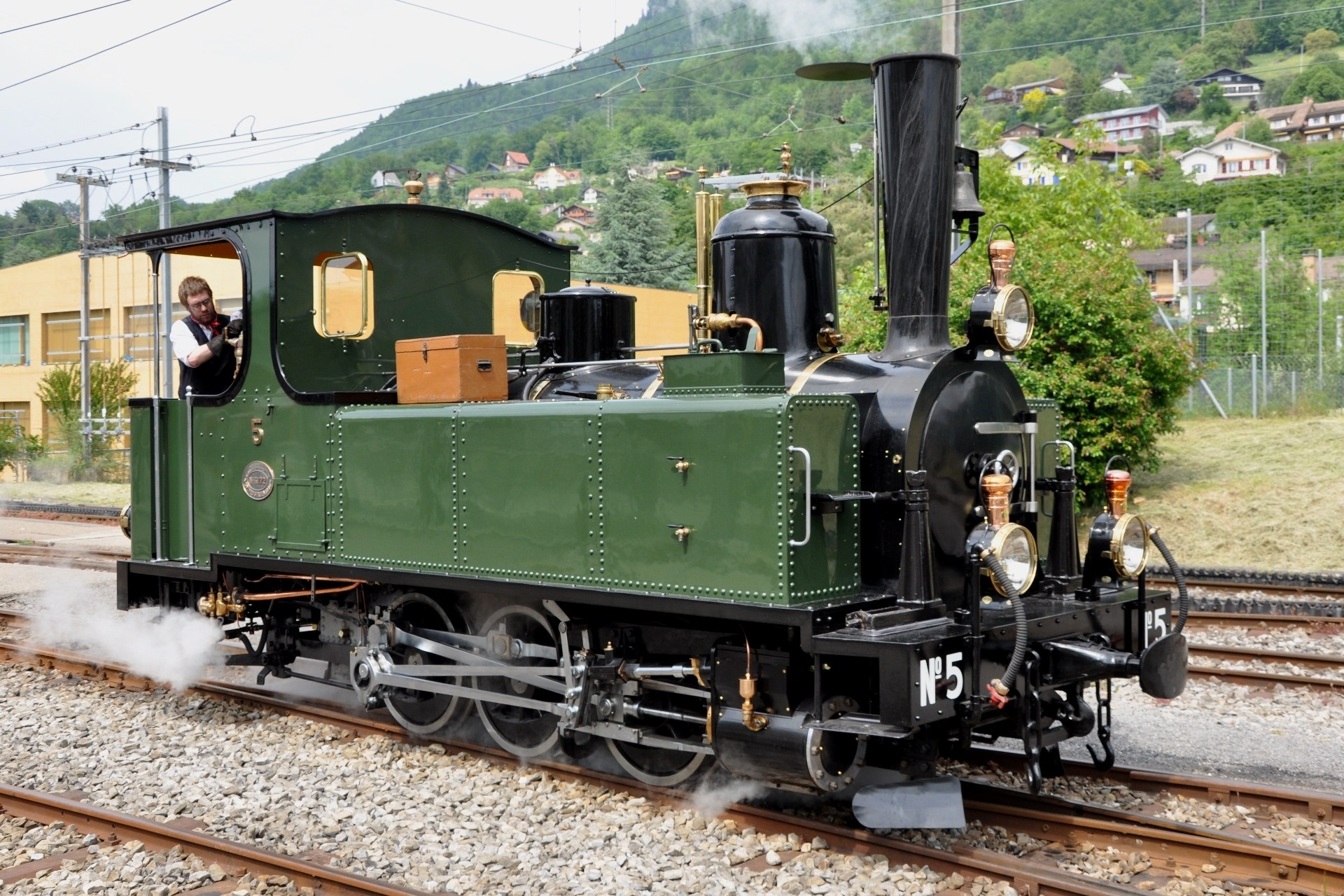
- LEB G 3/3 Bercher at the Blonay railway station in 2015.
Type and origin
- Power type: Steam
- Builder: EMBG
- Serial number: No. 2 unknown; No. 5: 4172
- Build date: 1888 and 1890
- Total produced: 2
Specifications
- Configuration
  - Whyte: 0-6-0T
  - UIC: C n2t
- Gauge: 1,000 mm (3 ft 3 3/8 in)
- Driver dia.: 810 mm (2 ft 7 7/8 in)
- Wheelbase: 1,800 mm (5 ft 10 3/4 in)
- Length: 6,830 mm (22 ft 5 in)
- Loco weight: Empty: 15.7 tonnes (34,600 lb); Service: 20.4 tonnes (45,000 lb)
- Fuel type: Coal
- Fuel capacity: 0.8 tonnes (1,760 lb)
- Water cap.: 2,200 L (480 imp gal; 580 US gal)
- Firebox
  - Grate area: 0.6 m^{2} (6.5 sq ft)
- Boiler pressure: 12 atm (1.22 MPa; 176 psi)
- Heating surface: 38.2 sq ft (3.55 m^{2})
- Cylinders: Two, outside
- Cylinder size: 270 mm × 370 mm (10 5/8 in × 14 9/16 in)
Performance figures
- Maximum speed: 25 km/h (16 mph)
- Power output: 150 PS (110 kW; 148 hp)
Career
- Operators: Lausanne–Echallens–Bercher railway
- Class: G 3/3
- Numbers: 2 Échallens and 5 Bercher
- Retired: No. 2: 1920
- Preserved: 1 (No. 5)
- Scrapped: No. 2: 1929

The Lausanne–Echallens–Bercher railway (LEB) G 3/3 2 and 5 is a two member class of metre gauge steam locomotives manufactured by Elsässische Maschinenbau-Gesellschaft Grafenstaden (EMBG) in the village Grafenstaden, entered in service 1888 and 1890. The weight in service is 20.4 tonnes (20.1 long tons; 22.5 short tons) and the maximum speed is 25 km/h (16 mph). The preserved example G 3/3 5 Bercher is operational on the Blonay–Chamby museum railway (BC) above Montreux at the Eastern end of Lake Geneva.

No. 2 was named Échallens. It was idled in 1920. Finding no buyer, it was scrapped in 1929.

No. 5 was sold in 1934 to Energie Ouest Suisse (EOS) and was used to haul materials on the construction site of the Dixence Dam. In 1941, she was sold on to the Hilti construction company (nowadays called Hilti & Jehle, in the Austrian state of Vorarlberg).

The Blonay–Chamby museum railway (BC) acquired her in 1973. For her 125th year of operation, the BC invested 125,000CHF in a major overhaul including a new boiler.

== Literature ==
- Gérald Hadorn und Jean-Louis Rochaix: Voies étroites de la campagne vaudoise, Bureau vaudois d'addresses (BVA), Lausanne 1986, ISBN 2-88125-004-1
- Michel Dehanne, Michel Grandguillaume, Gérald Hadorn, Sébastien Jarne, Anette Rochaix und Jean-Louis Rochaix: Chemins de fer privés vaudois 1873 - 2000, La Raillère, Belmont 2000, ISBN 978-2-88125-011-8
- Jean-Louis Rochaix, Sébastien Jarne, Gérald Hadorn, Michel Grandguillaume, Michel Dehanne und Anette Rochaix: Chemins de fer privés vaudois 2000 – 2009, 10 ans de modernisation, La Raillère, Belmont 2009, ISBN 978-2-88125-012-5
