= Blonay–Chamby Museum Railway =

Heritage railway in Blonay, Switzerland

Coordinates: 46.4656°N 6.8958°E

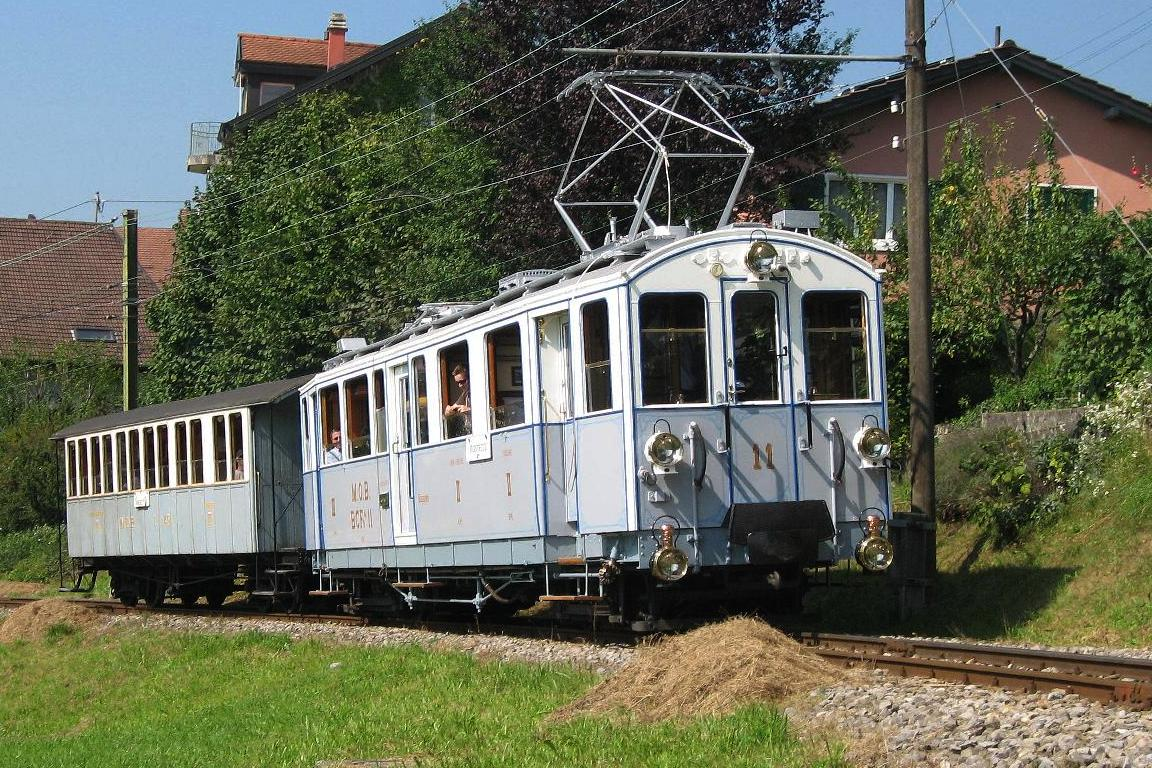
- Electric railcar BCFe 4/4 11 and passenger car BC^{4} 22 of the Montreux–Lenk im Simmental line

Overview
- Dates of operation: 1968–
- Predecessor: Chemins de fer électriques Veveysans

The Blonay–Chamby Museum Railway (French: Chemin de fer-musée Blonay-Chamby, BC) is a short 3-kilometre-long (1.9 mi) steep but adhesion worked metre gauge heritage railway operated as part of the Blonay–Chamby Railway Museum using vintage steam and electric locomotives and rolling stock. It uses the Blonay–Chamby railway line, originally built by the Chemins de fer électriques Veveysans. It is rail-connected at both ends: at its upper terminus, Chamby Station on the Montreux–Lenk im Simmental line and at the lower end, Blonay station on the Vevey–Les Pléiades railway line operated by Transports Montreux–Vevey–Riviera.

== History and aims ==
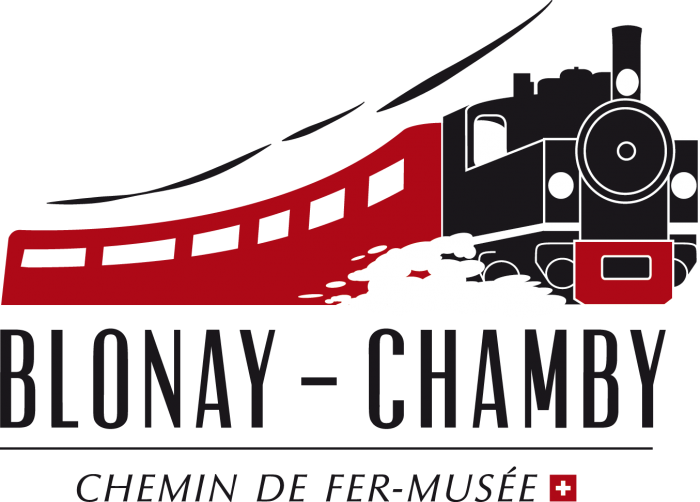
Blonay-Chamby Logo

The Blonay–Chamby Railway and Museum was opened in 1968 with the aims of operating the metre gauge railway line from Blonay to Chamby and in doing so preserving railway equipment of technical or historic value. For this purpose the Blonay–Chamby Railway built two motive power and carriage depots at Chaulin, a short distance from its upper terminus. They house what is generally regarded as the largest and most representative collection of preservation metre gauge rolling stock in the world.

== The museum line ==
The Blonay–Chamby Museum Railway is a railway preservation group staffed entirely by volunteers who operate trains each Saturday and Sunday between May and October. Vintage steam and electric hauled trains depart from Blonay and climb over Lake Geneva and the Alps. After reversing at or just before Chamby, the trains terminate at the museum site, where visitors can explore stationary exhibits.. A further part of the remit of the preservation group is the encouragement of local and regional tourism and tourist traffic on adjacent lines. The services from Blonay to Chamby and back are included in the Swiss National Railways Timetable.

== The museum collection ==
As of autumn 2021 was home to over 70 items of rolling stock, listed below:

=== Steam locomotives ===
==== Steam railway locomotives ====
Picture	No.	Name	Class	Cyls.	Built by	Works No.	Date built	Previous owners	Notes
	1	Le Doubs	G 3/3	OC	SLM	618	1890	RdB (Regional des Brenets), CMN (Chemins de fer des Montagnes Neuchateloises)	On loan from Swiss Transport Museum Luzern. Not operational
	3		HG 3/4	OC	SLM	2317	1913	BFD, FO	Abt rack In service.
	5	Bercher	G 3/3	OC	SACM	4172	1890	LEB, Energie Ouest Suisse, Hilti & Jehle, Feldkirch.	used by EOS to build Dixence Dam. Awaiting repairs.
	6		G 3/3	OC	SLM	1341	1901	Brünigbahn/Jura-Simplon JS 909, SBB 109, BAM No.6, Scierie Renfer, Bienne.	Under restoration
	23		G 3/5	OC	MTM	282	1926	Olot–Girona railway	Not operational.
	104	Zell	G 2x3/3	OC	Hanomag	10437	1925	SEG	Mallet design, 0-6-6-0T, Compound. Under restoration.
	105	Todtnau	G 2x2/2	OC	MBG	2051	1918	Haspe–Voerde–Breckerfeld Light Railway,	Mallet design, 0-4-4-0T, Compound. In service.
	99 193		G 5/5	OC	MFE	4183	1927	DR, DB.	Stationary, repainted in grey livery

==== Steam tramway locomotives ====
Picture	No.	Name	Class	Cyls.	Built by	Works No.	Date built	Previous owners	Notes
	4	Rimini	G 2/2	OC	Krauss	4278	1900	Ferrovie e Tramvie Padane (FTP), Ferrara-Codigoro and Rimini-Novafeltria.	Awaiting renovation
	7		G 2/4	System Brown	SLM	316	1882	Mulhouse Tramways	Stationary

=== Electric locomotives, railcars and trams ===
==== Locomotives ====
Picture	No.	Name	Class	Built by	Works No.	Date built	Previous owners	Notes
	2	La Grisette	He 2/2	SLM / CIE		1899	Bex–Villars–Bretaye (BVB)	Abt rack functional but only the rack wheel is driven.
	29	-	HGe 3/3	SLM / MFO		1926	Bernese Oberland railway (BOB)	Riggenbach rack, in service
	75	-	Ge 4/4	SLM / MFO	2328	1913	Georg Fischer (+GF+)	temporarily out of service
	81	-	Ge 4/4	SLM / BBC		1916	Berninabahn (BB), Rhaetian Railway (RhB)	in service

==== Railcars ====
Picture	No.	Name	Class/type	Built by	Works No.	Date built	Previous owners	Notes
	4	-	BCFe 2/2	SIG / MFO		1928	Ex-Sernftalbahn (SeTB)	historical picture, acquired 1969, under restoration to operational state.
	6	Valais	BCFeh 4/4	SLM / SIG / EGA	146	1909	Ex-Monthey–Champéry–Morgins railway (MCM)	Abt rack, operational
	10	-	BCFeh 4/4	SLM / SWS / BBC		1914	Loèche–Loèche-les-Bains railway (LLB)	Abt rack, operational
	11	les sept à vingt	BCFe 4/4	SIG / EGA	2191	1903	Montreux–Lenk im Simmental line,	operational
	12	-	Ce 2/2	Ringhoffer / EAG		1907	Langenthal–Jura railway (LJB), Oberaargau–Jura railway (OJB)	built in Prague
	35	-	ABe 4/4^{I}	SIG / SAAS / MFO		1908	Bernina railway (BB), Rhaetian Railway (RhB)	restoration 2024, operational
	105	-	ABDe 4/4	SWS / MFO		1913	Chemins de fer électriques Veveysans (CEV)	historical picture, acquired 2017, unrestored.
	2002	-	DZe 6/6	SIG / BBC	2703	1932	Montreux–Lenk im Simmental line	acquired 2008, operational

==== Trams ====
Picture	No.	Name	Class/type	Built by	Works No.	Date built	Previous owners	Notes
	7	-	Ce 2/2	Rat / CIE		1904	Tramway de Fribourg (TF)	stationary
	28	-	Ce 2/3	SWS / SAAS		1913	Tramways Lausannois (TL)	in service
	31	-	Ze 2/2	SIG / EGA		1914	Rheintalische Strassenbahn (Rhine Valley Tramways) (RhSt)	stationary
	52	-	Ce 2/2	SWS / MFO		1914	Städtische Strassenbahn, Bern (SSB)	in service
	76	-	Ce 2/2	SIG / MFO		1911	Tramways de Neuchâtel (TN)	stationary
	151	-	Fe 4/4	SIG / S&H		1911	Compagnie Genevoise des Tramways Électriques (CGTE)	in service

=== Passenger coaches ===
==== Railway passenger coaches ====
Picture	No.	Name	Class/type	Built by	Works No.	Date built	Previous owners	Notes
	2	-	As^{2}	SIG		1903	Ex-Rhaetian Railway Bernina Line (RhB)	acquired 1972, last restoration 2023, in service
	6	Kaiserwagen	B^{3}	SIG		1901	Bernese Oberland railway (BOB), Modelleisenbahnfreunde Eiger Zweilütschinen (MEFEZ)	Riggenbach rack, acquired 2013, in service
	7	-	C^{4}	ANF		1910	Chemin de fer Vicinaux de la Haute-Saône (CFV), Morez-La Cure (MLC), Nyon–St-Cergue–Morez railway (NStCM)	acquired 1993, in service
	10	-	BC^{2}			1908	Monthey-Champéry-Morgins (MCM), Aigle-Ollon-Monthey-Champery (AOMC)	Abt rack, in service
	11	-	BC^{2}	SIG		1890	Régional des Brenets (RdB)	historical picture, acquired 1973
	13	-	C^{2}	MAN		1905	Sernftalbahn (SeTB)	historical picture, ex BC^{2} 13, acquired 1969
	15	-	ABCFZ^{4}	De Dietrich		1895	Cie de l'Ouest, Chemins de fer de l'Etat (ETAT), Societe Nationale des Chemins de fer Francais (SNCF)/Réseau Breton (RB)	acquired 1968, in service
	20	Reine Berthe	C^{2}	Chevalier, Chailus & Cie à Paris		1865	Lausanne–Echallens–Bercher railway (LEB), original Mont Cenis Pass Railway	acquired 2016, in service
	21	-	CF^{2}	SIG		1900	Aigle–Leysin railway (AL)	Abt rack, acquired 1973, in service
	21	-	BC^{2}	SWS		1902	Chemins de fer électriques Veveysans (CEV)	acquired 1971, in service
	21	Giardiniera	C^{2}	SWS		1911	Lugano–Cadro–Dino railway (LCD)	acquired 1990, in service
	21	-	CF^{2}	SIG		1890	Régional des Brenets (RdB)	historical picture, acquired 1973
	22	-	BC^{4}	SIG		1915	Loèche - Loèche-les-Bains (LLB)	Abt rack, acquired 1967, in service
	22	-	BC^{4}	SIG		1902	Montreux–Lenk im Simmental line	acquired 1971, in service
	23	-	C^{2}	SWS		1903	Gruyère–Fribourg–Morat railway (GFM)	acquired 1967, in service
	44	-	C^{4}	SIG		1926	Berner Oberland Bahn (BOB)	Riggenbach rack acquired 1967, in service
	61	-	B^{4}	SIG		1906	Montreux–Lenk im Simmental line	acquired 2016, in service
	121	-	AB^{2}	SIG		1903	Rhaetian Railway (RhB)	acquired 1972, in service
	171	-	C^{4}	Herbrand		1891	Mittelbadische Eisenbahn Gesellschaft (MEG)	acquired 1967, in service

==== Tramway passenger coaches ====
Picture	No.	Name	Class	Built by	Works No.	Date built	Previous owners	Notes
	57	-	C^{2}	SIG		1930	Tramway Vevey–Montreux–Chillon–Villeneuve (VMCV), Bex–Villars–Bretaye Railway (BVB)	acquired 1970, in service
	370	-	C^{4}	SIG		1920	Compagnie Genevoise des Tramways Électriques (CGTE)	acquired 1967, in service

==== Post and baggage coach ====
Picture	No.	Name	Class	Built by	Works No.	Date built	Previous owners	Notes
	36	-	FZ^{2}	SWS		1903	Gruyère–Fribourg–Morat railway (GFM)	in service

=== Goods wagons ===
Picture	No.	Name	Class	Built by	Works No.	Date built	Previous owners	Notes
	30	-	K	Kirchheim		1874	Schweizerische Lokalbahnen (SLB), Appenzeller Bahn (AB)	acquired 1968, stationary
	31	-	K	MAN		1905	Sernftalbahn (SeTB)	acquired 1969, in service
	31	-	K	SWS		1910	Tramways de Lausanne (TL)	acquired 1993, in service
	41	-	K	SWS		1915	Leuk-Leukerbad railway (LLB)	Abt rack, acquired 1967, in service
	51	-	M	SWS		1915	LLB	Abt rack, acquired 1967, in service
	60	-	L	SWS		1915	LLB	Abt rack, acquired 1967, in service
	87	-	K	SWS		1912	Aigle–Leysin railway (AL)	Abt rack, acquired 1977, in service
	101	-	K	SIG		1903	Montreux–Lenk im Simmental line	acquired 2014, in service
	153	-	L^{O}	SIG		1901	MOB	acquired 2006, in service
	610	-	K	SWS		1904	Gruyère–Fribourg–Morat railway (GFM)	in service
	672	-	K	GFM		1955	GFM	acquired 2012 - on display at Vevey station
	706	-	M	Busch		1904	MOB	acquired 2005, in service.
	712	-	L	SWS		1905	GFM	acquired 2002, in service.
	810	-	O	Busch		1903	MOB	acquired 1989, in service

=== Diesel locomotives, shunters and maintenance vehicles ===
Picture	No.	Name	Class/type	Built by	Works No.	Date built	Previous owners	Notes
	1	-	Tm 2/2	O&K, Berlin	20200	1930	Montreux–Lenk im Simmental line, Holzwerk Rieder St. Stephan	in service
	3	Biniou	Dm 2/2	Billard			SNCF, Réseau Breton (RB)	under restoration
	926	Bouc ("goat")	Te 2/2	StStZ / MFO		1935	Verkehrsbetriebe Zürich (VBZ)	Shunter, in service
		-	Dm 1/2				Rhaetian Railway (RhB)	Petrol Powered draisine
		-	Dd 1/2				Rhaetian Railway (RhB)	Hand driven draisine, operational

=== Rotary snowplough ===
Picture	No.	Name	Class	Cyls.	Built by	Works No.	Date built	Former Owners	Notes
	9214	-	X^{rot d}	OC	SLM	2299	1912	Bernina railway, Rhaetian Railway (RhB), Dampfbahn Furka-Bergstecke (DFB)	0-6-6-0. moveable. The blade is operated with external steam supply.

=== Service coach and wagons ===
Picture	No.	Name	Class/type	Built by	Works No.	Date built	Former Owners	Notes
	1	-	Xe 2/2	SWS / MFO		1915	Tramway de Bienne (TrB)	Tank for fire service, under restoration
	52	-	X^{2}				Chemins de fer électriques Veveysans (CEV)	stationary.
	52	-	X^{2}	SWS		1915	Loèche–Loèche-les-Bains (LLB)	Abt rack, acquired 1967 as LLB M 52, since 2008 crane truck. Operational.
	466	Trois Pattes	C^{3}	SIG		1889	JBL C^{3} 466, preceding Swiss Federal Railways, Brünig line X^{3} 9951	stationary.

=== Loaned-out rolling stock ===
Picture	No.	Name	Class/type	Built by	Works No.	Date built	Previous owners	Notes
	121	Baladeuse	C^{4}	Maschinenbau-Gesellschaft Basel		1892	Tramways de Neuchâtel (TN)	permanent loan to Musée du tram Neuchâtel, Association Neuchâteloise des Amis du Tramway (ANAT)
	125	-	Ce 2/2	SIG / SAAS		1920	Compagnie Genevoise des Tramways Électriques (CGTE)	permanent loan to Association Genevoise du Musée des Tramways (AGMT)

=== Former rolling stock ===
Picture	No.	Name	Class/type	Built by	Works No.	Date built	Previous owners	Current owners
	230	-	C^{2}	SWS		1905	Gruyère-Fribourg-Morat (GFM)	acquired 1969, taken over by GFM Historique in 2012
	40	-	K	SWS		1915	Loèche–Loèche-les-Bains railway (LLB)	Abt rack, acquired 1969, sold to the municipality of Inden, Switzerland, Switzerland in 2017
	671	-	K	GFM		1955	Gruyère–Fribourg–Morat railway (GFM)	taken over by GFM Historique in 2020, and exhibited at the Broc chocolate factory.
	111	-	K	Baume & Merpent		1886	YSteC	scrapped in 2014
	1011	-	X	GFM		1914	Gruyère–Fribourg–Morat railway (GFM)	Former K 635, transformed 1955 into F 424, D^{2} 424, transformed 1973 into emergency wagon, scrapped in 2014

== Notes ==
=== Abbreviations for Rolling stock manufacturers ===
- BBC : Brown, Boveri & Cie, Zurich
- CIE : Compagnie de l'Industrie Électrique, Geneva
- EAG : Elektrizitätsgesellschaft Alioth, Basel
- MFE : Maschinenfabrik Esslingen
- MFO : Maschinenfabrik Oerlikon, Zurich
- MGK : Maschinenbau-Gesellschaft Karlsruhe
- MTM : Maquinista Terrestre y Marítima, Barcelona
- O&K : Orenstein & Koppel, Berlin
- Rat : Rathgeber, Munich
- SAAS : Société Anonyme des Ateliers de Sécheron, Geneva
- SIG : Schweizerische Industrie Gesellschaft (Swiss Industrial Company)
- SLM : Schweizerische Lokomotiv- und Maschinenfabrik, Winterthur (Swiss Locomotive and Machine Works)
- SACM : Elsässische Maschinenbau-Gesellschaft Grafenstaden (Grafenstaden Alsatian Engineering Company)
- SEG : Süddeutsche Eisenbahn-Gesellschaft (South German Railway Company), Darmstadt
- SWS : Schweizerische Wagons- und Aufzügefabrik AG Schlieren-Zürich (Swiss Wagon and Lift company)

=== Abberviations for Steam locomotive cylinders ===
- OC : Cylinders outside frames
- IC : Cylinders inside frames

== See also ==
- List of heritage railways and funiculars in Switzerland
- Swiss locomotive and railcar classification

== Literature ==
- Sébastien Jarne, Le chemin de fer-musée Blonay-Chamby, tiré à part du livre « Voies étroites de Veveyse et de Gruyère », édition Chemin de fer-musée Blonay-Chamby, Lausanne, éd. 2, 1991, 56 p.
- José Banaudo and Alex Rieben, À la découverte du Chemin de fer-musée Blonay-Chamby, Édition du Cabri, Breil-sur-Roya, 1992, ISBN 978-2-903310-98-1.
- Peter Willen, Lokomotiven und Triebwagen der Schweizer Bahnen, volume 2, Privatbahnen Westschweiz und Wallis. Orell Füssli Verlag, Zürich, 1977, ISBN 3-280-00923-5.
- Alain Candellero, Charles-Maurice Emery, Brice Maillard and Nicolas Regamey, 40 ans de musée vivant, Chemin de fer musée Blonay-Chamby 1968–2008, édition Chemin de fer-musée Blonay-Chamby, Lausanne, avril 2008, 32 p.
- Alain Castella and Charles-Maurice Emery: Faire la Voie, Chemin de fer-Musée Blonay-Chamby, Département de la formation, de la jeunesse et de la culture (DFJC) – Service des affaires culturelles (SERAC) of Canton de Vaud, Lausanne, 2010
- Michel Grandguillaume, Gérald Hadorn, Sébastien Jarne, Jean-Louis Rochaix, François Ramstein: Voies étroites de Veveyse et de Gruyère. Bureau vaudois d'addresses (BVA), Lausanne 1984, ISBN 2-88125-003-3
