= Rhaetian Railway Gem 4/4 =

Swiss electro-diesel locomotive

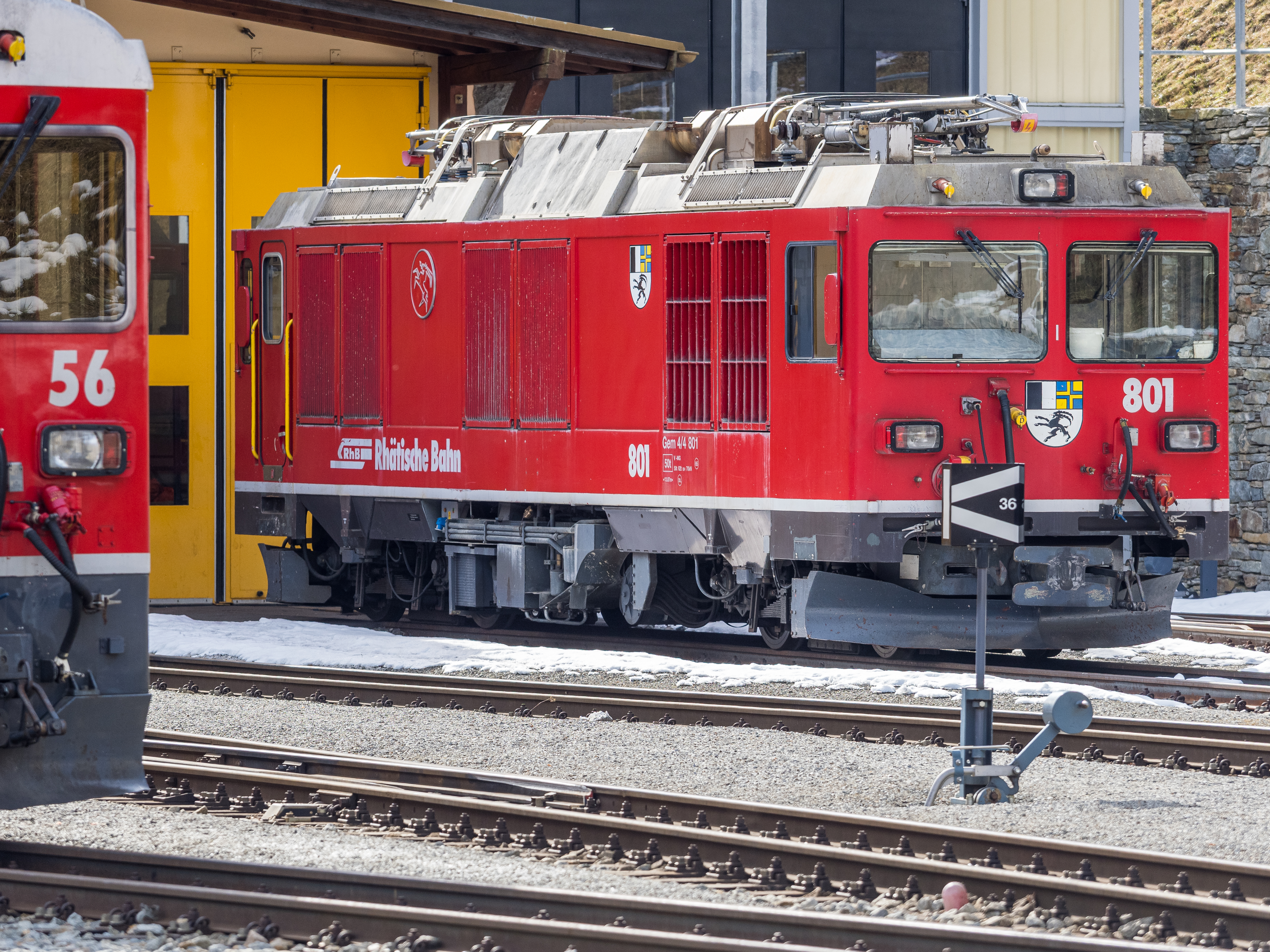
- Gem 4/4 801 in Poschiavo (2026)
Type and origin
- Power type: Electro-diesel
- Builder: SLM, SWS, BBC, and MFO
- Build date: 1966
- Total produced: 2
Specifications
- Configuration
  - UIC: Bo′Bo′
- Gauge: 1,000 mm (3 ft 3 3/8 in) metre gauge
- Wheelbase: 2,200 mm (7 ft 3 in)
- Length: 13,540 mm (44 ft 5 in)
- Width: 2,700 mm (8 ft 10 in)
- Height: 3,820 mm (12 ft 6 in)
- Loco weight: 50 tonnes (49.2 long tons; 55.1 short tons)
- Fuel type: Diesel fuel
- Electric system/s: 1,000 V DC Overhead
- Current pickup: Pantograph
- Engine type: Four stroke diesel engine
- Traction motors: 4 (type EMR 475-wound)
Performance figures
- Maximum speed: 65 km/h (40 mph)
- Power output: Electric: 560 kW (750 hp); Diesel: 780 kW (1,050 hp)
- Tractive effort: 80 kN (17,980 lbf)
Career
- Operators: Rhaetian Railway
- Numbers: 801–802
- Locale: Graubünden, Switzerland
- Delivered: 1966
- Disposition: Both still in service

The Rhaetian Railway Gem 4/4 is a two member class of metre gauge Bo′Bo′ electro-diesel locomotives operated since 1968 by the Rhaetian Railway (RhB), which is the main railway network in the Canton of Graubünden, Switzerland.

The class is so named under the Swiss locomotive and railcar classification system. According to that system, Gem 4/4 denotes a narrow gauge electro-diesel engined adhesion locomotive with a total of four axles, all of which are drive axles.

The companies involved in building the Gem 4/4s were the Swiss Locomotive and Machine Works (SLM), Schweizerische Wagons- und Aufzügefabrik AG Schlieren-Zürich (SWS), Brown, Boveri & Cie (BBC) and Maschinenfabrik Oerlikon (MFO). The power output of the Gem 4/4s at the wheels is 780 kilowatts (1,050 hp) in diesel operation, and 680 kilowatts (910 hp) under the DC wires.

Closely related to the Gem 4/4s are the two HGm 4/4s that were delivered a year later to the Furka Oberalp Bahn.

== Technical details ==
=== As delivered ===
The Gem 4/4 locomotives, which bear the traffic numbers 801 and 802, each feature two diesel engines with DC generators. They can therefore operate over the entire Rhaetian Railway network, independently of the overhead catenary. Many components of their electrical equipment match those of the ABe 4/4 class electric railcars used on the Bernina Railway, with the consequence that the Gem 4/4s can be used on that railway, which is electrified at 1,000 V DC, like a normal electric locomotive. However, the Gem 4/4s are not also able to draw current from the 11 kV 16.7 Hz AC catenary used to power electric locomotives on the rest of the Rhaetian Railway network.

When the Gem 4/4s are operating on the Bernina Railway, their diesel engines are needed only in case of failure of the contact wires, for example following an avalanche. In that event, one of the locomotive's two generators can be used to supply an Xrote (Ger.) class snow blower (either no 9918 or no 9919) with DC current, and the second generator is sufficiently powerful to move the locomotive and snow blower. In this way, the DC powered blowers can also be put to use on the Rhaetian Railway's core network. However, this has seldom been the case since the delivery of the Rhaetian Railway's Xrotm (Ger.) class diesel powered snow blowers.

=== As rebuilt ===
Between 2000 and 2003, the Rhaetian Railway radically modernised the Gem 4/4s, which, in more than just their external appearance, had become noticeably affected by many years of hard use. During their rebuilding, both locomotives were fitted with new Cummins diesel engines, each with an output of 709 kilowatts (951 hp), and they also received new drivers cabs and computerised control electronics.

== Liveries ==
At the time of their commissioning, the Gem 4/4s were painted red with silver ventilation grilles. Between 1986 and 1987, the livery was revised as follows: grey-brown frame, red body with bilingual logo and the cantonal shield of Graubünden.

Since the Gem 4/4s were rebuilt, they have remained in red livery. The two locomotives can be distinguished by their silver side-mounted logos: no 801 is fitted with an ibex (Steinbock), and no 802 is decorated with a marmot (Murmeltier).

== Operational deployment ==
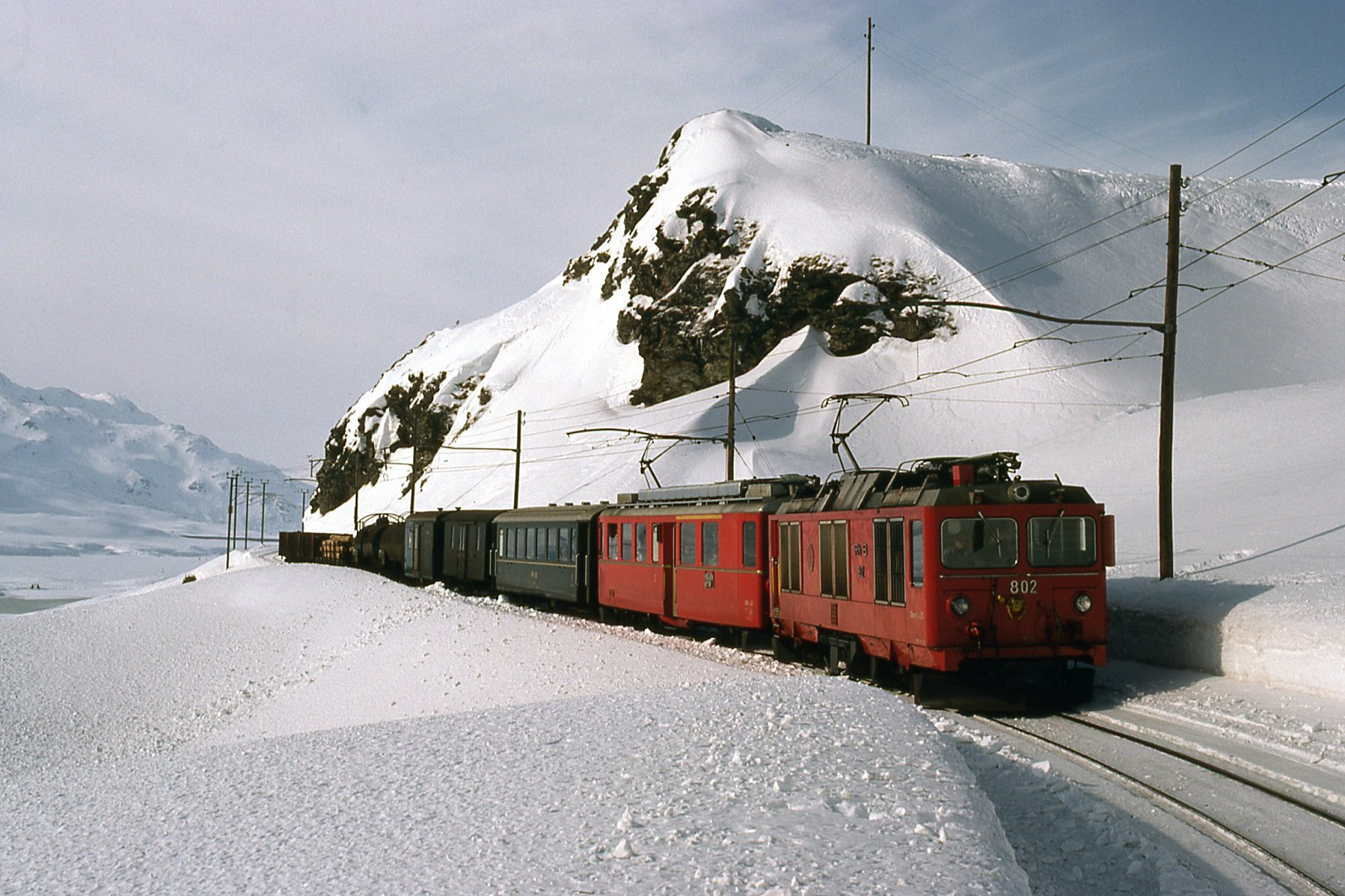
Unrebuilt Gem 4/4 802 above Lago Bianco, 1980s.

Ever since the Gem 4/4 electro-diesels were commissioned, their main area of operation has been the Bernina Railway, where they are often to be seen working in a multiple unit combination with railcars. In addition, they operate construction trains and snow clearing services throughout the Rhaetian Railway network.

Between 1973 and 1981, both Gem 4/4s were reserved each summer for the haulage of the Bernina Express. They would take over the Tirano-bound through coaches in Samedan from the St Moritz express train, and then pilot them in diesel operation to Surovas or Bernina Diavolezza, where the Gem 4/4 would be switched to DC electric operation. Thereafter, the Gem 4/4 would lead the Bernina Express further, to Tirano. Today, this form of operation would be regarded as hybrid traction.

Ever since the installation in 1981 of a switchable catenary section above track 3 at Pontresina station, the Bernina Express through coaches from Chur have been hauled as far as Pontresina by a core network electric locomotive powered by 11 kV AC current. After the train stops in Pontresina, the core network locomotive is uncoupled, and the catenary section is switched to 1,000 V DC. A Bernina Railway railcar train is then manoeuvred onto the existing train. The rolling stock so added is usually made up of ABe 4/4 II or ABe 4/4 III railcars, sometimes mixed with a Gem 4/4. At the conclusion of the timetabled seven-minute halt in Pontresina, the train continues further under the DC wires and over the Bernina Pass towards Tirano.

== List of locomotives ==
List of the Gem 4/4 locomotives of the Rhaetian Railway
Traffic number	Name	Commissioning	Rebuild	Status
801	Steinbock	1968	2002	in service
802	Murmeltier	1968	2003	in service

== See also ==
- History of rail transport in Switzerland
- Rail transport in Switzerland
