= Rhaetian Railway ABe 4/4 II =

Swiss metre-gauge railcar class

Rhaetian Railway ABe 4/4 ^{II}
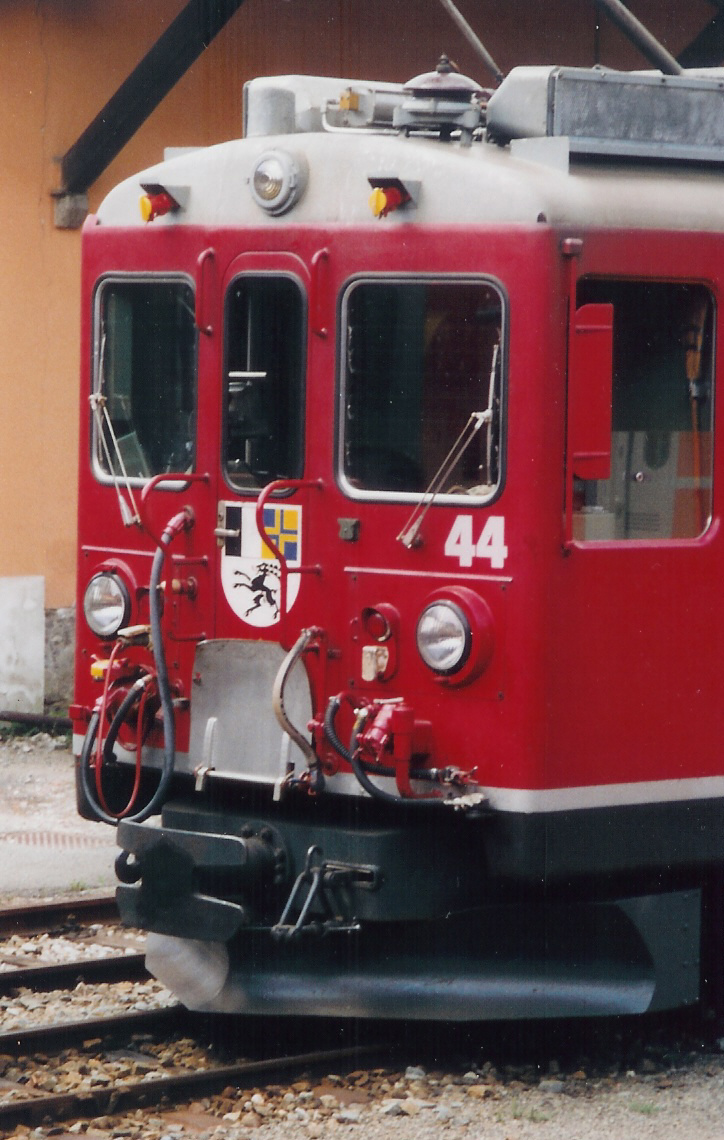
- The characteristic front of the ABe 4/4 ^{II}, here no 44 at Tirano station.
- In service: 1964–2010
- Manufacturers: SWS, SAAS, and BBC
- Constructed: 1964–1965, 1972
- Number built: 9
- Number in service: Revenue: 0 Departmental: 3
- Number scrapped: 5
- Fleet numbers: 41–49
- Operator: Rhaetian Railway
- Line served: Bernina Railway

Specifications
- Car length: 41–46: 16,540 mm (54 ft 3 1/8 in); 47–49: 16,886 mm (55 ft 4 5/6 in)
- Width: 2,650 mm (8 ft 8 3/8 in)
- Maximum speed: 65 km/h (40 mph)
- Weight: 41–46: 41 tonnes (40 long tons; 45 short tons); 47–49: 43 tonnes (42 long tons; 47 short tons)
- Power output: 680 kW (910 hp)
- Electric system: 1000 V DC Overhead
- Current collection: Pantograph
- UIC classification: Bo′Bo′
- Track gauge: 1,000 mm (3 ft 3 3/8 in) metre gauge

The Rhaetian Railway ABe 4/4 ^{II} is a class of metre gauge railcars of the Rhaetian Railway (RhB), which is the main railway network in the Canton of Graubünden, Switzerland.

The class is so named because it was the second class of railcars of the Swiss locomotive and railcar classification type ABe 4/4 to be acquired by the Rhaetian Railway. According to that classification system, ABe 4/4 denotes an electric railcar with first and second class compartments and a total of four axles, all of which are drive axles.

All members of the class operate on the Bernina Railway, under the traffic numbers 41 to 49 (motrice quaranta).

== Technical Details ==
The ABe 4/4 ^{II} class railcars were the first new items of motive power to be acquired by the Rhaetian Railway since its merger with the Bernina Railway in 1943 for use on the 1000 V DC powered Bernina line. They were delivered in two series: nos 41–46 in 1964–1965, and 47–49 in 1972.

The mechanical components for the class were manufactured by Schweizerische Wagons- und Aufzügefabrik AG Schlieren-Zürich (SWS). The electrical componentry, made by SAAS and Brown, Boveri & Cie, conformed with decades old technologies for DC powered railways: contactor relay controls and universal motors.

Members of the class have a top speed of 65 kilometres per hour (40 mph), weigh 41 tonnes (40 long tons; 45 short tons) to 43 tonnes (42 long tons; 47 short tons), and have a power output of 680 kilowatts (910 hp). Maximum towing capacity is 70 tonnes (69 long tons; 77 short tons), and two powered cars can combine to haul the maximum draw hook load. The second series (nos 47–49) differs from the first only by being about 350 millimetres (14 in) longer and having a different bogie type.

Since entering service, these red liveried railcars have not been subjected to any significant alterations. They are fitted with 12 seats in first class, and 24 in second class.

The built in multiple-unit train control enables multiple unit operation with the Gem 4/4 class electro-diesel locomotives (nos 801–802), and also with the newer ABe 4/4 ^{III} class railcars (nos 51–56). Moreover, the ABe 4/4 ^{II}s can be operated in combination with the Xrotet snow blowers (nos 9218–9219) by remote control from the cab of the snow blower.

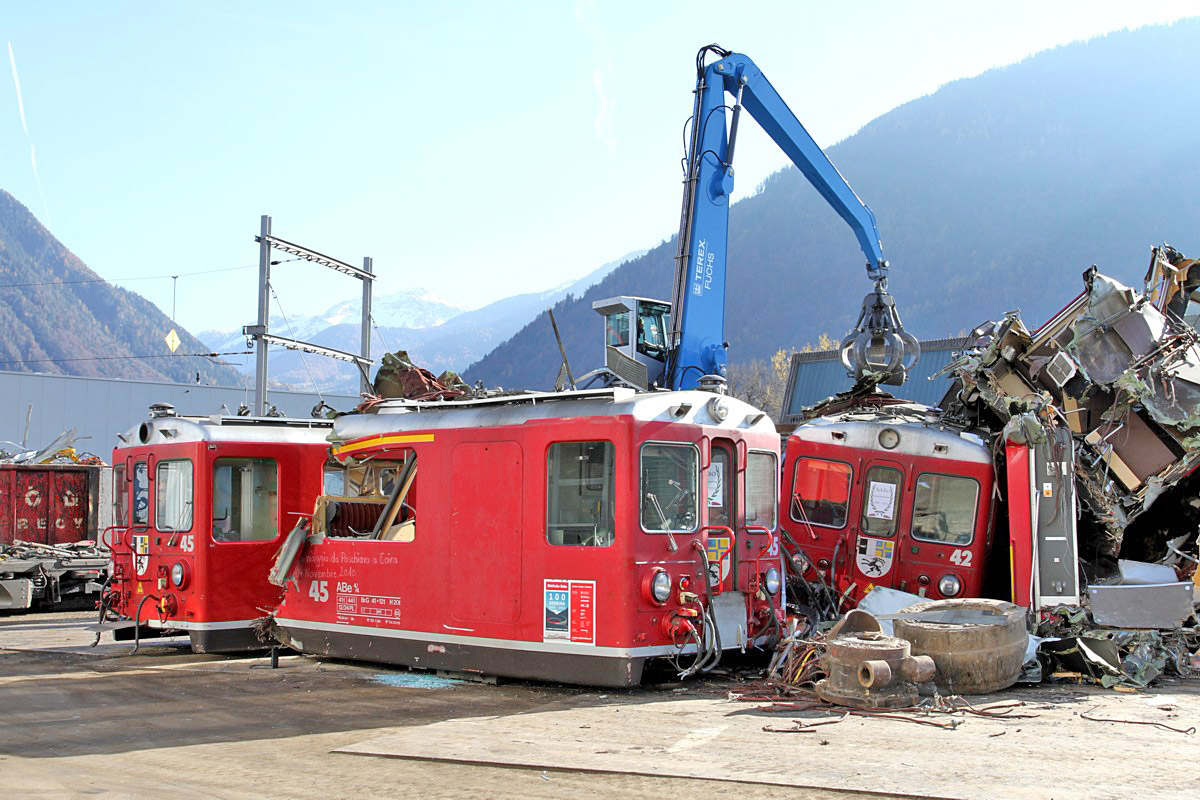
42 and 45 being scrapped in 2010

At the end of Summer season 2010 and after eight ABe 8/12 Allegra class EMUs had been delivered, Rhaetian Railway put off the ABe 4/4 ^{II}. Numbers 41, 42 and 45 were towed to the scrapyard early in November 2010, 43 and 44 followed by mid-December. The three members of the second series plus 46 have been handed over to the infrastructure department for use as service vehicles, in place of the Xe 4/4 class nos 9922–9924. 48 has been rebuilt into Xe 4/4 232 01 in 2012.

In 2020 the Rhb Historic announced that ABe 4/4 II no. 46 was selected for preservation into their register as it's an historical vehicle into their collection eventually the locomotive will be saved for preservation and will be preserved by Club 1889 collection.

== Livery ==
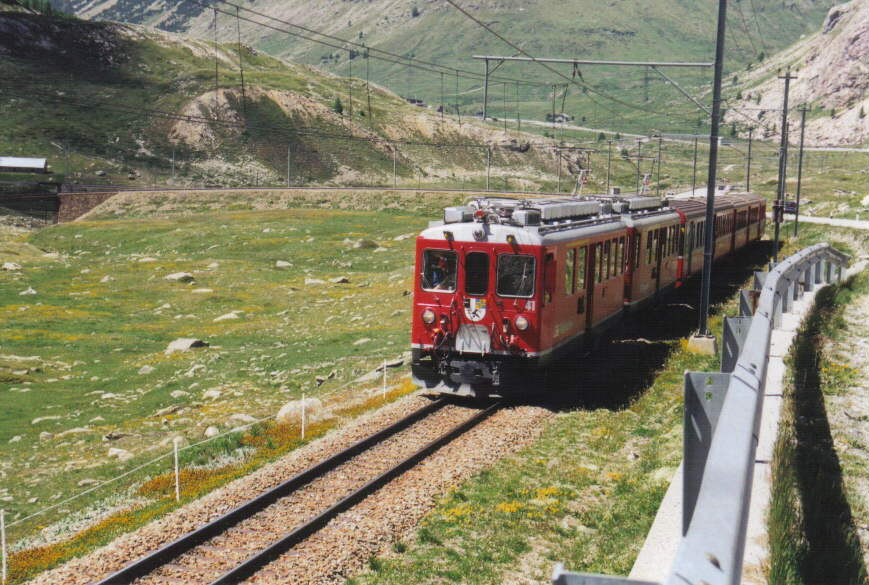
Two ABe 4/4 IIs in multiple unit operation below Ospizio Bernina

Although the ABe 4/4 ^{II} class has always been decorated in a red livery, their appearance has evolved over the years, in line with changing Rhaetian Railway standards. On delivery, nos 41–46 had chrome trims, and nos 47–49 were given painted mouldings. These were originally golden, and later white. The name Rhaetian Railway was initially applied to all members of the class in its shortened German language form of RhB.

From 1973 onwards, the then new Rhaetian Railway "signet" logo was applied, and from 1983 also the Rhaetian Railway's full name, in all three official languages of the Canton. The fonts of the technical markings have also changed over the years. The most recent change was from 1988, when pinstripes were set lower on the car bodies, and the underlying chassis painted dark grey, in the style of Rhaetian Railway locomotives.
