= Rhaetian Railway ABe 4/4 I =

Swiss metre-gauge railcar class

Rhaetian Railway ABe 4/4 ^{I}
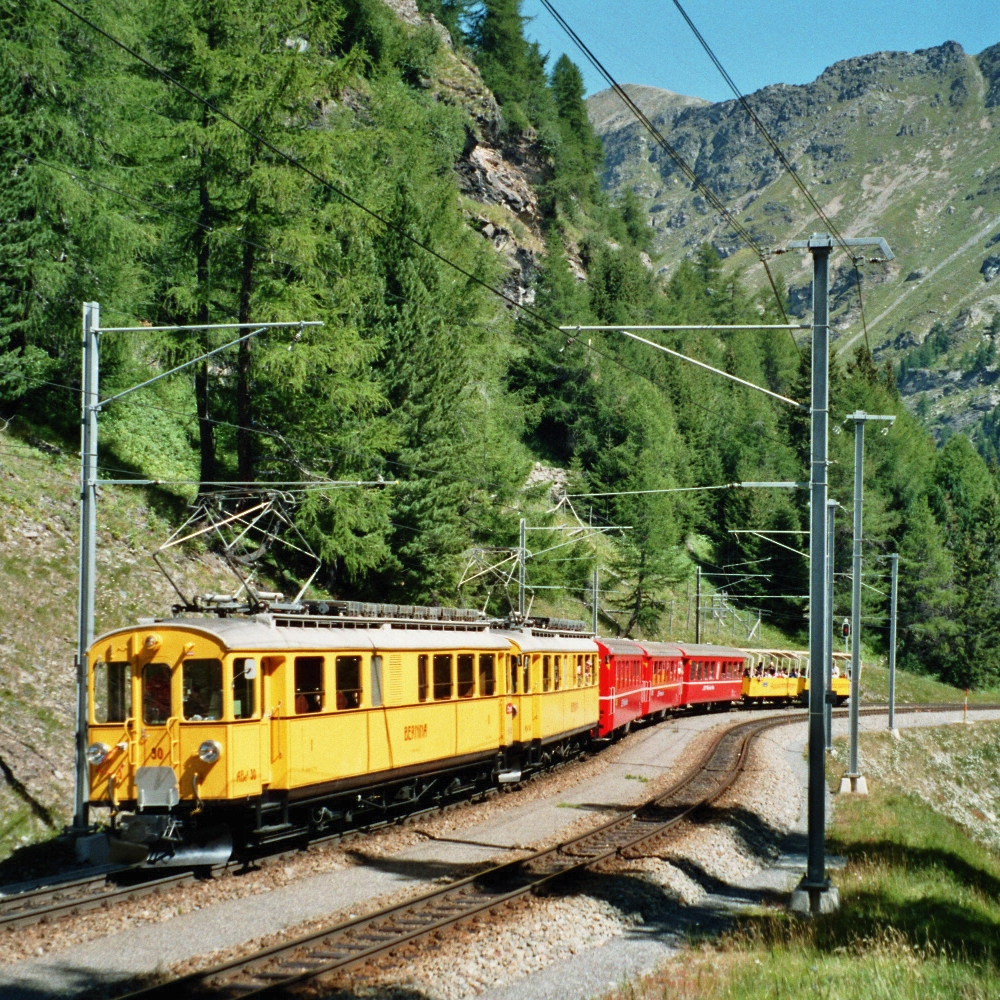
- ABe 4/4 ^{I} 30 and 34 below Alp Grüm
- Manufacturer: SIG, Alioth
- Constructed: 1908–1911 (new); 1946–1953 (rebuilt)
- Number built: 17 (new); 9 (rebuilt)
- Number in service: 3
- Number scrapped: 14
- Fleet numbers: 1–14, 21–23 (original); 30–38 (after rebuild)
- Operators: Rhaetian Railway
- Lines served: Bernina Railway

Specifications
- Car length: 13,930 mm (45 ft 8 3/8 in)
- Width: 2,500 mm (8 ft 2 3/8 in)
- Maximum speed: 55 km/h (34 mph)
- Weight: 30 tonnes (30 long tons; 33 short tons)
- Power output: 396 kW (530 hp)
- Tractive effort: 102 kN (22,930 lbf)
- Electric system(s): 1000 V DC Overhead
- Current collection: Pantograph
- UIC classification: Bo′Bo′
- Track gauge: 1,000 mm (3 ft 3 3/8 in) metre gauge

The Rhaetian Railway ABe 4/4 ^{I} is a class of metre gauge railcars of the Rhaetian Railway (RhB), which is the main railway network in the Canton of Graubünden, Switzerland.

The class is so named because it was the first class of railcars of the Swiss locomotive and railcar classification type ABe 4/4 to be acquired by the Rhaetian Railway. According to that classification system, ABe 4/4 denotes an electric railcar with first and second class compartments and a total of four axles, all of which are drive axles.

Created between 1946 and 1953 by the rebuilding of existing railcars originally built between 1908 and 1911, they carry the traffic numbers 30–38, and operate on the 1,000 V DC powered Bernina Railway. Since 1988–1990, when the ABe 4/4 ^{III} class railcars were placed into service, the ABe 4/4 ^{I} class has been much less frequently used on passenger trains. Following the deployment of the ABe 8/12 Allegra class railcars, only two ABe 4/4 ^{I}s are retained as heritage vehicles by the RhB, with one other preserved at the Blonay–Chamby Museum Railway.

== The original Bernina Railway (BB) railcars ==
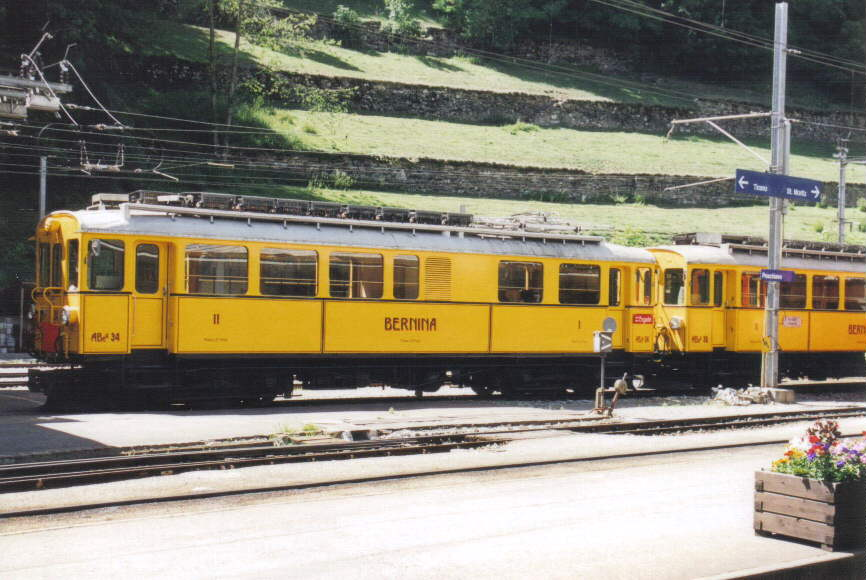
ABe 4/4 ^{I}, nos 34 and 30.

The Bernina Railway (BB), which opened in 1908, originally procured a total of 17 electric railcars in two series from the manufacturers Schweizerische Industrie Gesellschaft (SIG) und Elektrizitätsgesellschaft Alioth. All of these railcars were later rebuilt as Rhaetian Railway ABe 4/4 ^{I} class railcars.

The 13.93 m (45 ft 8 3/8 in) long BCe 4/4 class railcars of the first Bernina Railway series (traffic numbers 1 to 14) offered 12 seats in first class, and 31 in second class. In the 14.66 m (48 ft 1 1/8 in) long second Bernina Railway series railcars (traffic numbers 21 to 23), seven of the second class seats were omitted in favour of a luggage compartment, and that series was therefore given the class designation BCFe 4/4. (The names of the two series were reduced to writing as BCe^{4} and BCFe^{4}, respectively.)

The same electrical equipment was used for all of these railcars; it was rated as developing 220 kW (300 hp) at 22 km/h (14 mph). In comparison with the then preferred green and grey liveries for railway vehicles, the two railcar series clearly stood out, with their yellow livery, black and red shadow lettering and numbering, and striking red route signs. In 1921, railcar no 13 was renumbered as no 15, because some superstitious passengers had been avoiding travelling in it.

== Rebuilding by the Rhaetian Railway ==
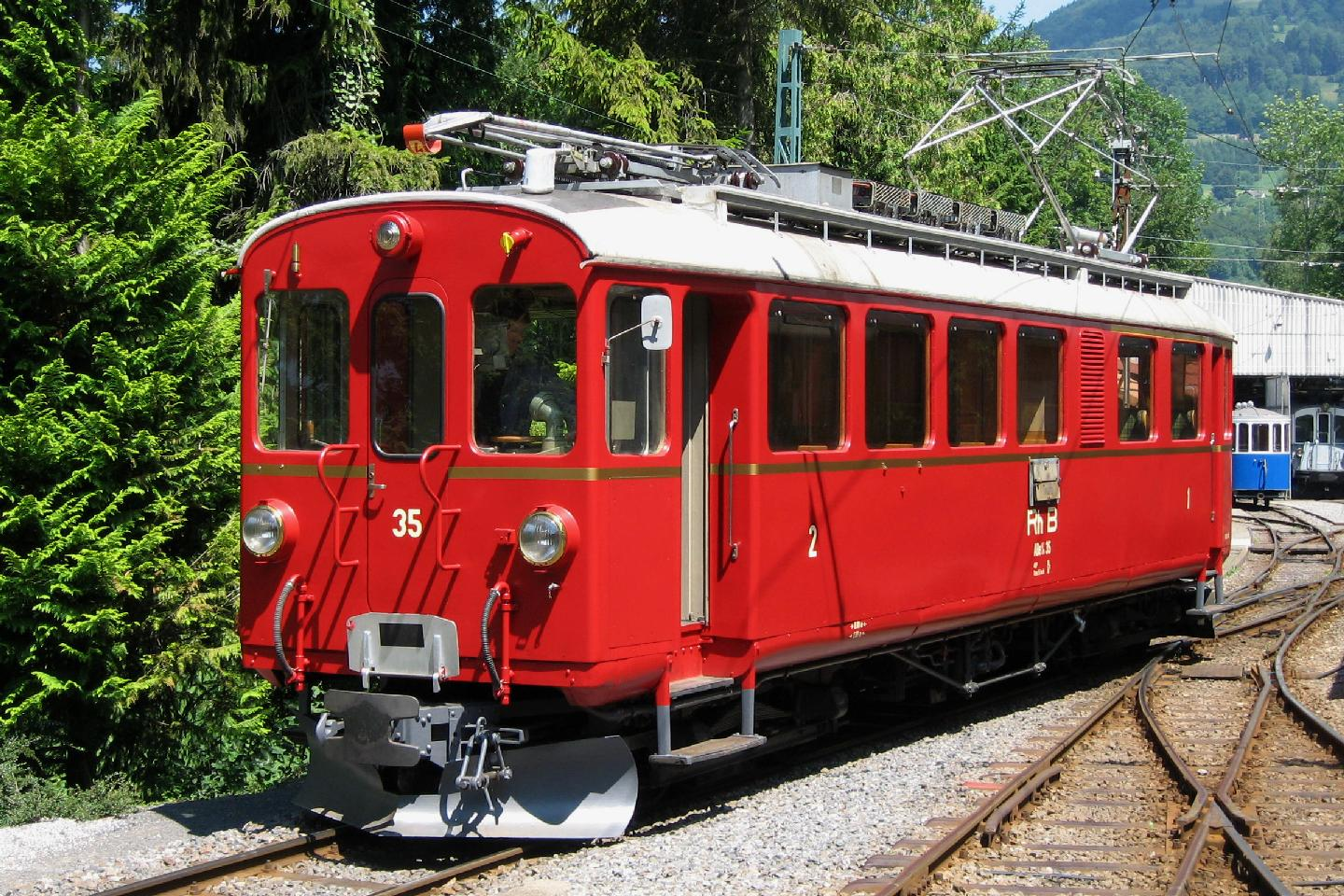
ABe 4/4 ^{I} Nr. 35 at the Blonay–Chamby Museum Railway

The Rhaetian Railway's takeover of the BB in 1943 included the acquisition of the BB's ageing railcars. With their service history of only up to 35 years, those railcars had not yet reached the end of their working lives, but their performance left much to be desired.

However, the railcars were not the only aspect of the BB requiring significant investment. For that reason, the Rhaetian Railway refrained from purchasing new railcars. Instead, the company began to modernise the BB's existing rolling stock, using its own workshops at Landquart and Poschiavo. In all the existing railcars, the throttle controls and braking mechanisms, previously arranged under the railcar floor, were relocated to the roof. In some cases, the railcar side panels were lengthened, and the box girders welded. A pantograph replaced one of the two original current collectors.

Nine railcars received completely new electrical equipment; their power output was thereby increased to 395 kW (530 hp), and in some of the later rebuilds to as much as 440 kW (590 hp). Those modifications doubled the railcars' maximum towing capacity to 40 t (39 long tons; 44 short tons), and increased their top speed from 45 to 55 km/h (28 to 34 mph). This first series of rebuilt railcars was given the new traffic numbers 30–38 (see table).

The Chur-Arosa-Bahn, which was similarly merged with the Rhaetian Railway during World War II, brought to that merger only six railcars, which was insufficient for its burgeoning winter sport traffic. As the traffic peak on the Bernina Railway was in summer, it was possible, after the three way merger, to redeploy a few railcars to Chur each winter.

For that purpose, the Rhaetian Railway rebuilt railcars nos 31 to 34 in 1946–1947 to a dual voltage configuration. That rebuilding included totally new electrical equipment with a step controller and more powerful motors made by SAAS, and an air brake system for the railcars themselves. However, trains hauled by the railcars continued to be braked using a vacuum system. In 1953, a fifth railcar, no 30, was similarly rebuilt. For use on the Chur-Arosa-Bahn, which was operated by a direct current system until 1997, rebuilt railcars nos 30–34 were equipped during the rebuild with regenerative brakes. At a later stage, the retention of the step controllers enabled them also to be fitted with multiple unit control.

The other railcars to undergo rebuilding, nos 35 to 38, were only given electrical equipment for the Bernina Railway, and no air compressor. Instead of the SAAS step controllers, they were fitted with MFO multistage controllers. On these railcars, the omission of dual voltage equipment facilitated a higher nominal rated output.

The remaining eight vehicles retained their old traction motors and traffic numbers, but their power output was able to be increased by better ventilation to the traction motors.

When third class travel was abolished in 1956, the BCe 4/4s were reclassified as ABe 4/4s, and the BCFe 4/4s as ABFe 4/4s, which, from 1961, were again reclassified, this time as ABDe 4/4s.

Over time, most of the railcars also received fully welded metal body panels, and, simultaneously, rounded corners at the bases of their windows.

== Liveries ==
All of the railcars later rebuilt as the ABe 4/4 ^{I} class entered service with the Bernina Railway in a yellow livery. After the merger with the Rhaetian Railway, that livery was initially replaced with green and crème. Towards the end of the 1950s, various members of the class became all green in colour.

In the course of the 1960s, the railcar livery was changed to red, but some members of this class of railcar remained in the old livery of green/crème or green right up to their withdrawal from service.

In the years 2000 and 2001, respectively, railcars nos 30 and 34 were repainted in yellow, and outwardly returned to their original appearance. As heritage vehicles, they are put into service on special trains, and also during the summer traffic peaks. As such, they operate also with the passenger car no C114, which was restored by Club 1889 and established as a catering car, along with BC 110, which has also had its interior restored to an approximation of its original state.

== List of railcars ==
List of the ABe 4/4 ^{I} and ABDe 4/4 railcars of the Rhaetian Railway (previously Berninabahn)
First; Traffic number	Commissioning	Rebuild	Traffic no. after rebuild	Last traffic no.	yellow livery	green/crème livery	green livery	red livery	Notes	Whereabouts
1	1908	1947 *	31	31	1908	1947	1959	1963		scrapped 2009
2	1908	1946 *	32	32	1908	1946	1957	1965		scrapped 2009
3	1908			3	1908	19..	1957	--		scrapped 1969
4	1908	1947 *	34	34	1908; 2001	1947	--	1962	since 2001 Heritage-Tw (yellow)	in operation
5	1908	1946 *	33	33	1908	1946	1956	--	destroyed by fire on 8 May 1962 at Alp Grüm	scrapped 1962
6	1908			9921	1908	--	--	1960	renumbered 1960 to official car Xe 4/4 9921, brown-red	scrapped 1969
7	1908			7	1908	19..	1957	--		scrapped 1965
8	1908			8	1908	19..	--	--		scrapped 1967
9	1908	1953		9920	1908	--	1953	1964/90	swept away 1951 by an avalanche, rebuilt as service car Xe 4/4	scrapped 1998
10	1908	1949	35	35	1908	1949	--	1962	sold to Blonay–Chamby Museum Railway in 2010	in operation
11	1909			11	1909	19..	--	1964		scrapped 1976
12	1909	1951	37	9923	1909	1951	1957	1965	rebuilt 1997 as Xe 4/4 9923, auxiliary car Poschiavo, orange	scrapped 2015
13	1909			15	1909	19..	--	--	renumbered 1921 as 15	scrapped 1969
14	1909	1950	36	9924	1909	1950	--	1963	rebuilt 1998 as Xe 4/4 9924, auxiliary car Pontresina, orange	scrapped 2012
21	1911	1949	38	9922	1911	1948	--	1962	luggage compartment retained, classification ABDe 4/4 rebuilt 1992 to Xe 4/4 9922, catenary service Poschiavo, orange	scrapped 2016
22	1911	1953 *	30	30	1911; 2000	1953	--	1966	luggage compartment removed 1953, since 2000 Heritage-Tw (yellow)	in operation
23	1911			23	1911	1948	1956	--	luggage compartment removed 1956	scrapped 1969

- Rebuilt as dual voltage railcar 1000/2200 V =, to 1997 also suitable for Chur-Arosa-Railway.

== Sources, further reading ==
=== Literature ===
- Claude Jeanmaire: Die Gleichstromlinien der Rhätischen Bahn. Verlag Eisenbahn, Villigen 1975, ISBN 3-85649-020-5
- Peter Willen: Lokomotiven der Schweiz 2, Schmalspur Triebfahrzeuge. Orell Füssli, Zürich 1972
