= Poschiavo railway station =

Swiss train station

Poschiavo
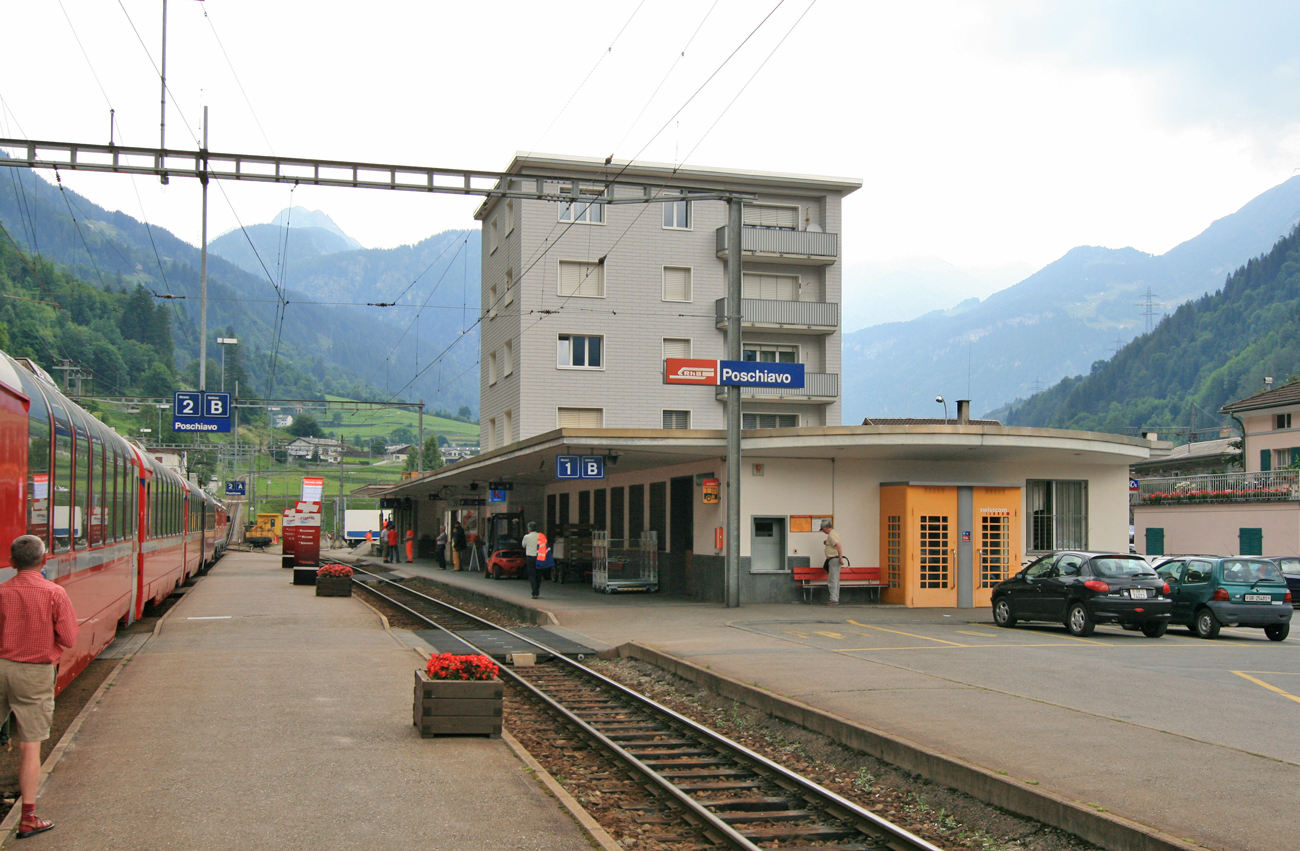
- The station in 2008, prior to remodelling

General information
- Location: vial da la Stazion; Poschiavo; Switzerland
- Coordinates: 46°19′29″N 10°03′16″E
- Elevation: 1,014 m (3,327 ft)
- Owner: Rhaetian Railway
- Line: Bernina line
- Distance: 43.6 km (27.1 mi) from St. Moritz
- Train operators: Rhaetian Railway
- Connections: AutoPostale buses

Construction
- Architect: Theodor Hartmann (1962)

History
- Opened: 1 July 1908

Passengers
- 2018: 710 per weekday

Services
Preceding station	Rhaetian Railway	Following station
Alp Grüm towards Chur or St. Moritz	Bernina Express	Le Prese towards Tirano
Cavaglia towards St. Moritz	RE 9	Le Prese towards Tirano
Cadera towards St. Moritz	R 19	Li Curt towards Tirano
Location

Poschiavo railway station is a railway station in the municipality of Poschiavo, in the Swiss canton of Grisons. It is located on the Bernina line of the Rhaetian Railway. The station lies just outside the village of Poschiavo, and is linked to it by an avenue at right angles to the line.

The station opened on 1 July 1908 with the opening of the Tirano to Poschiavo section of the Bernina line. The station building dates from 1962, and the station was modernised and remodelled between 2016 and 2019.

The station has a five-story station building on one side of the line, whilst on the opposite side of the line is the principal depot of the Bernina line, responsible for maintaining the 1000 V DC rolling stock used on the line, with several lines between them. Since the recent remodelling, only the line nearest the station building is served by a raised and widened platform. A stretch of double track immediately to the north of the station, and a passing loop to the south, offer the ability for trains to pass each before or after calling at the platform.

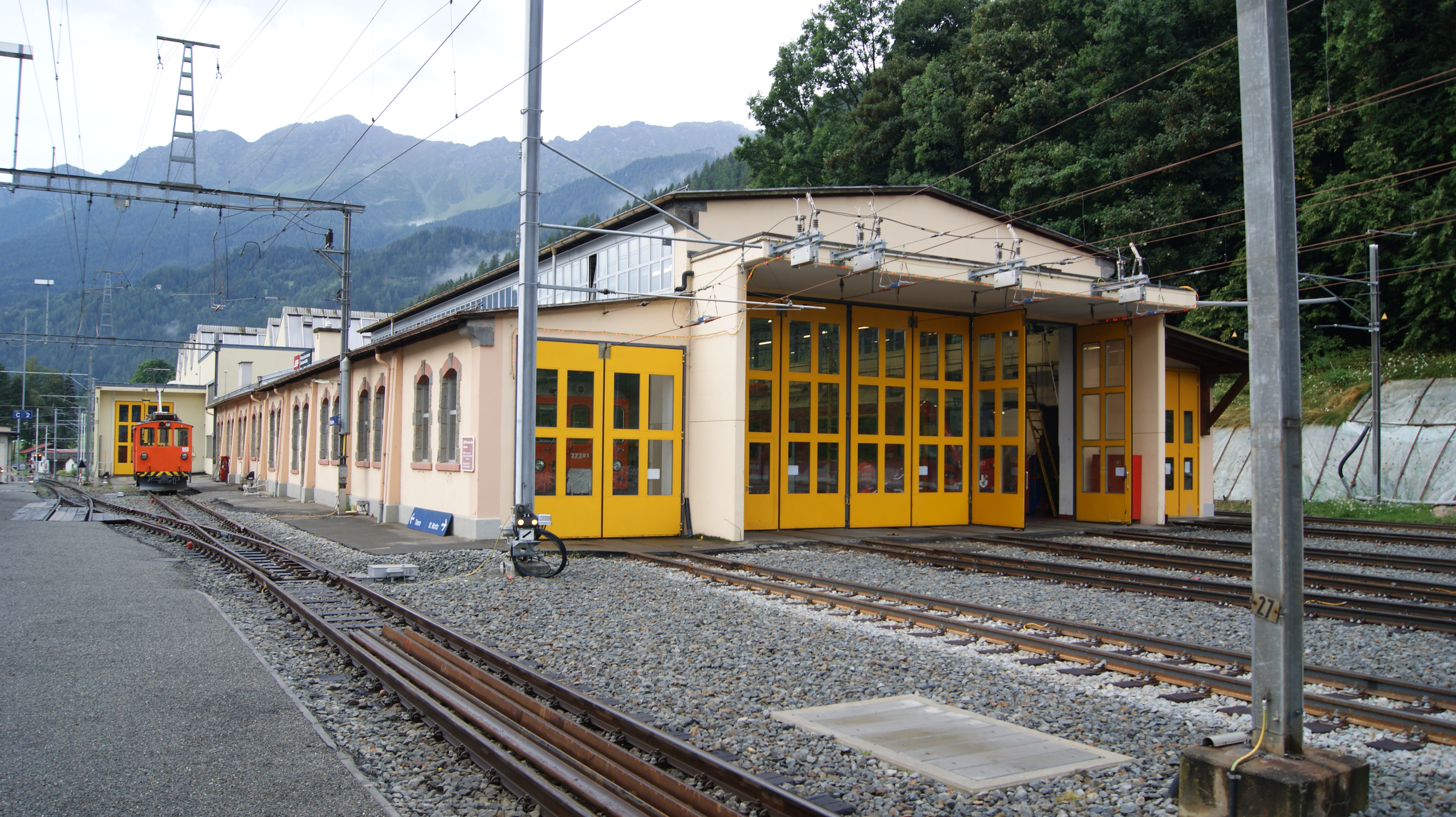
Depot buildings looking towards Tirano

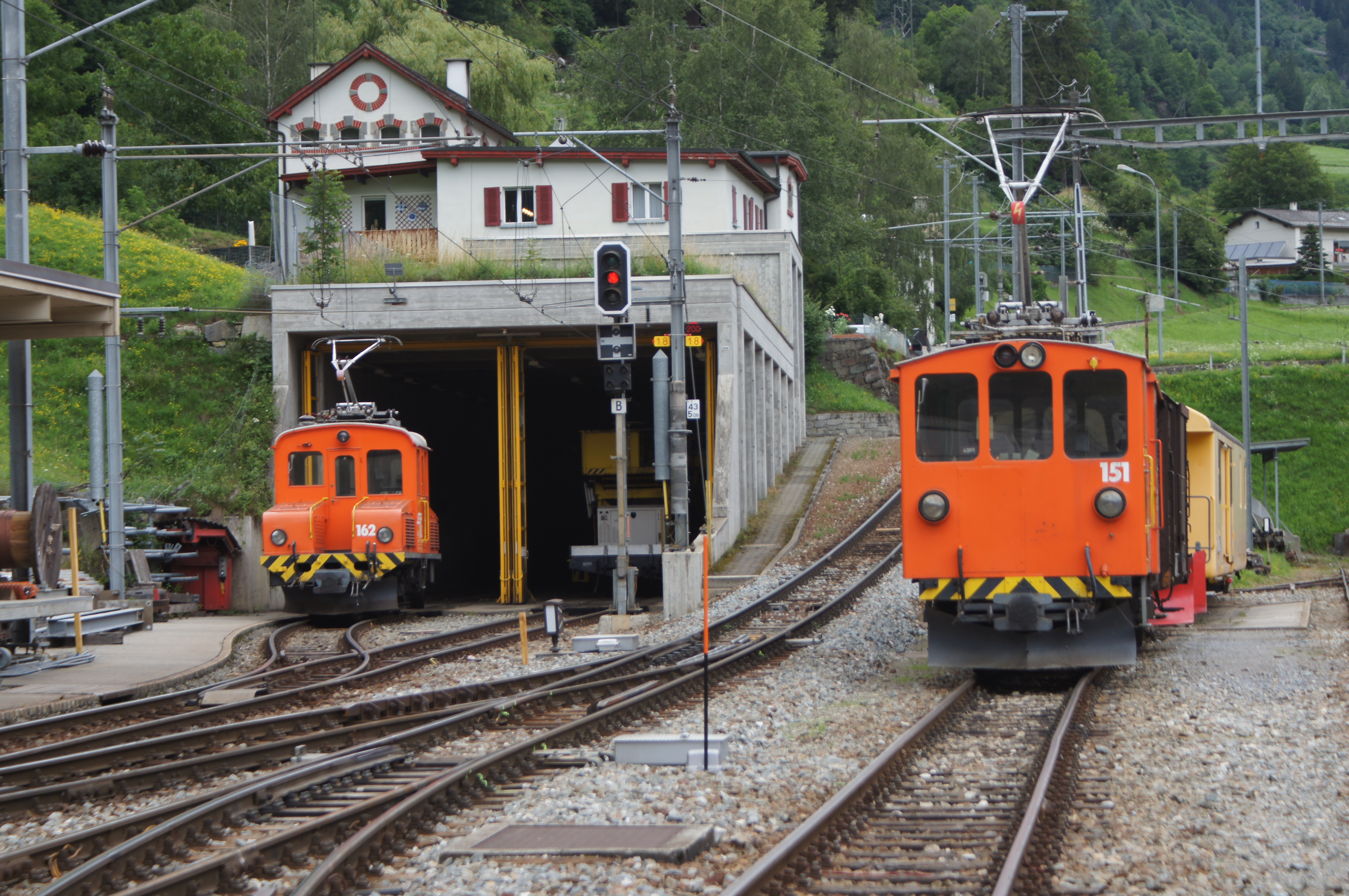
Depot buildings looking towards St Moritz

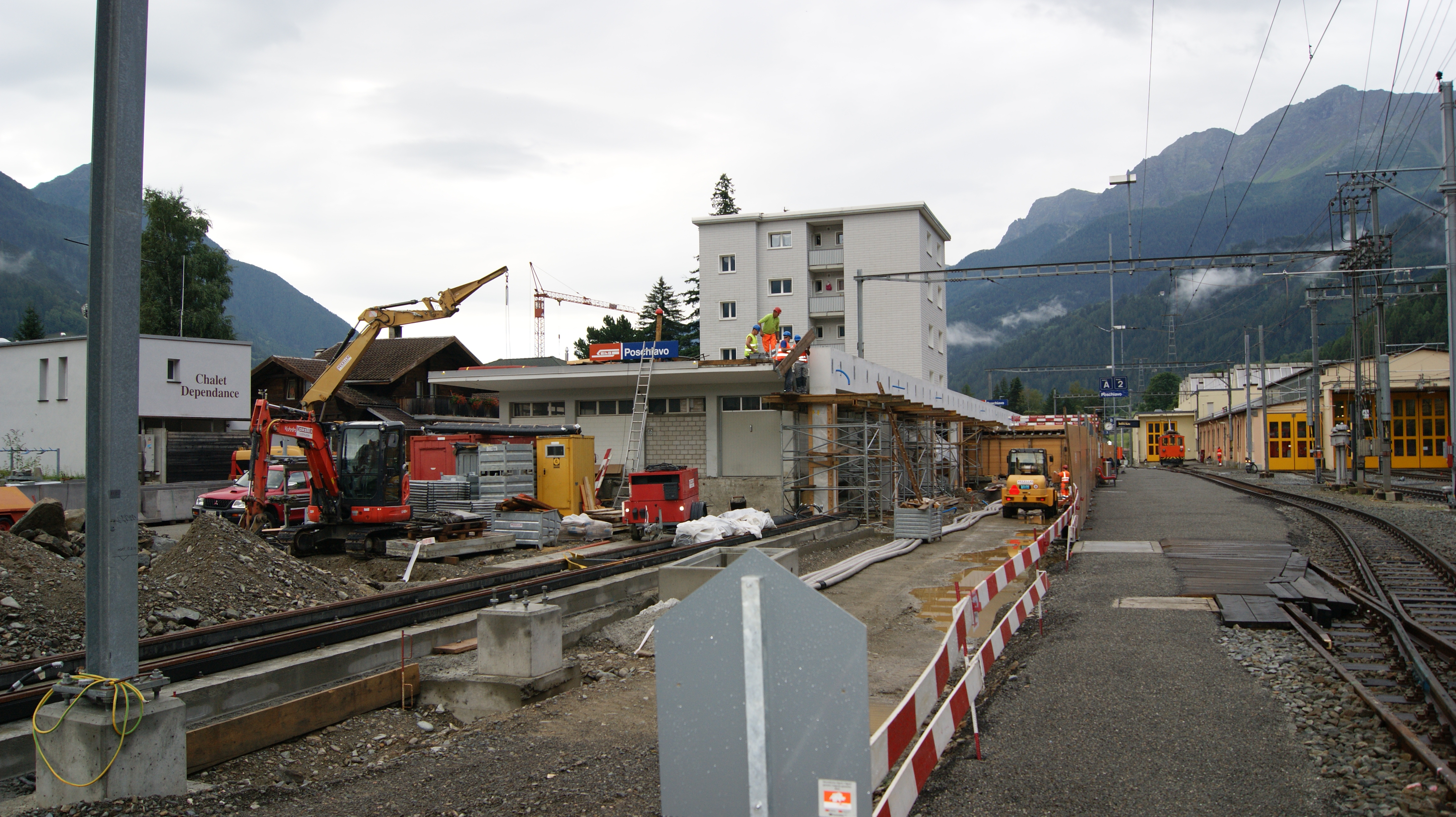
The station during the remodelling

== Services ==
As of the December 2023 timetable change, the following services stop at Poschiavo:

- Bernina Express: Several round-trips per day between Chur or St. Moritz and Tirano.
- RegioExpress / Regio: hourly service between St. Moritz and Tirano.
