= Bernina =

Bernina can refer to:

== Geography ==
- Bernina Range, a mountain range in the Swiss and Italian Alps
- Piz Bernina, the highest peak of the Bernina Range
- Bernina Pass, a pass in the Bernina Range
- Bernina District, former administrative district in the canton of Graubünden, Switzerland

== Rail transport ==
- Bernina railway, a single-track railway connecting Switzerland and Italy via the Bernina Pass
- Bernina Express, a train running on the Bernina railway
- Bernina Diavolezza (Rhaetian Railway station), a station on the Bernina railway
- Bernina Lagalb (Rhaetian Railway station), a station on the Bernina railway
- Bernina Suot (Rhaetian Railway station), a station on the Bernina railway

== Organizations ==
- Bernina International, a manufacturer of sewing and embroidery systems
