= Val Minor =

Valley in Graubünden, Switzerland

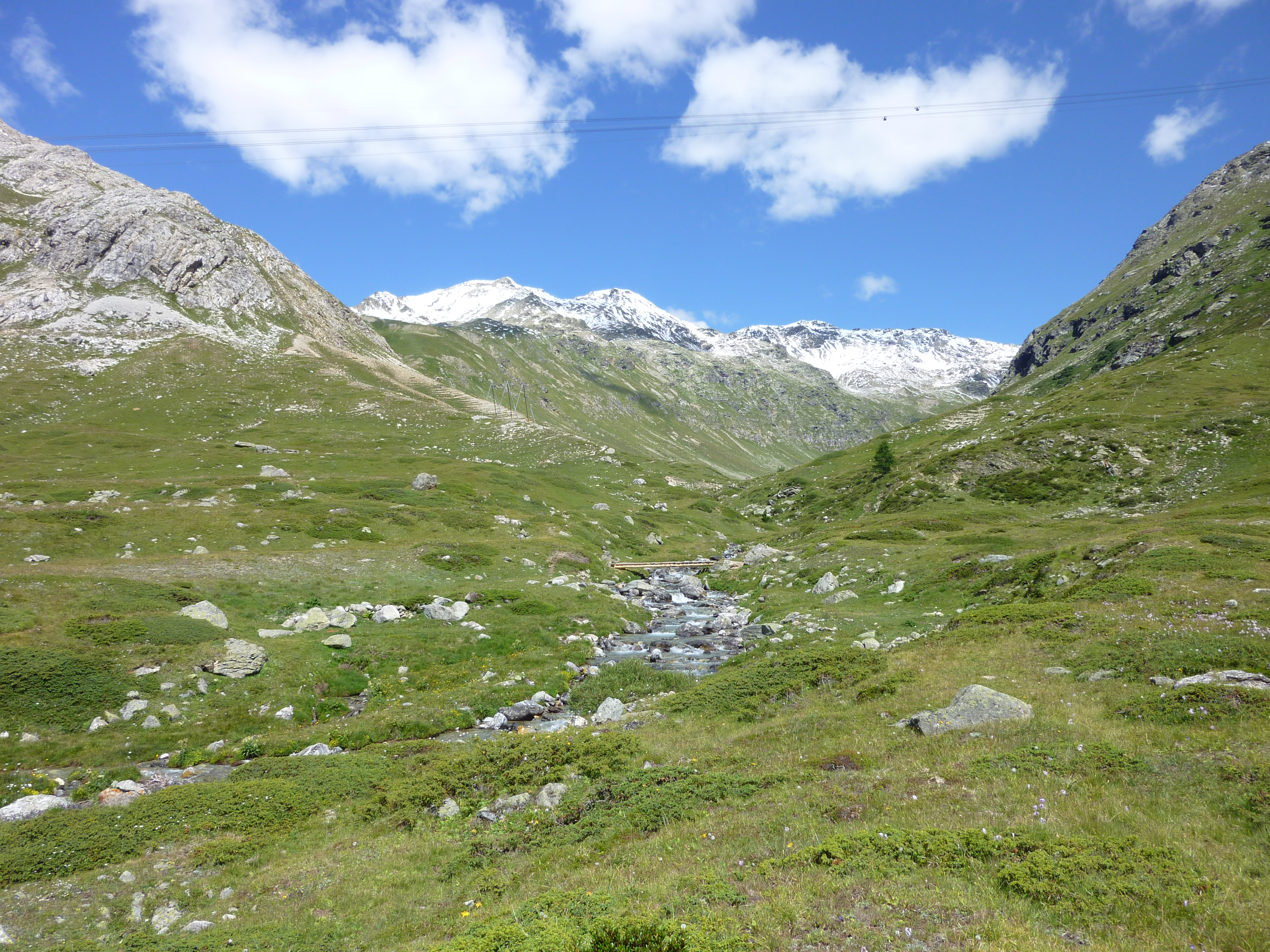
Val Minor

Val Minor is a valley in the municipal area of Pontresina, north of the Bernina Pass in Canton of Graubünden, Switzerland. The valley is at an elevation of around 2,400 m (7,900 ft). The valley entrance lies between the Piz Lagalb and Piz Alv. Val Minor is flanked by Piz Alv and Piz Minor on the right and Piz Lagalb on the left. At the end of the valley is the mountain lake Lej Minor. At present, it is accessible on foot or by bicycle.

There are two hypotheses for the name of the valley. The first is that it is derived from the Romansh word mina ("mine") with reference to historical mining that took place within the valley. The other is that it is derived from the Latin word minor ("smaller"), although there is no corresponding Val Maior.

== Mining ==
The valley was the site of some historical mining activity between the 13th and 16th centuries, although only small amounts of lead and silver were mined.

The Mining History Trail leading into the Val Minor provided information about mining in the valley. Explanations were given about rock deposits in the area and the formation of mineshafts. Eight information boards led from the Lagalb valley station to the Bernina Pass height in the Camino gallery, the only one still accessible, afterwards to the pyrite - arsenopyrite occurrence and also via the Fuorcla Minor. The two tunnel districts and the hut Fuorn d’Plattas from 1458 also belonged to the stops.

== Lej Minor ==
Lej Minor
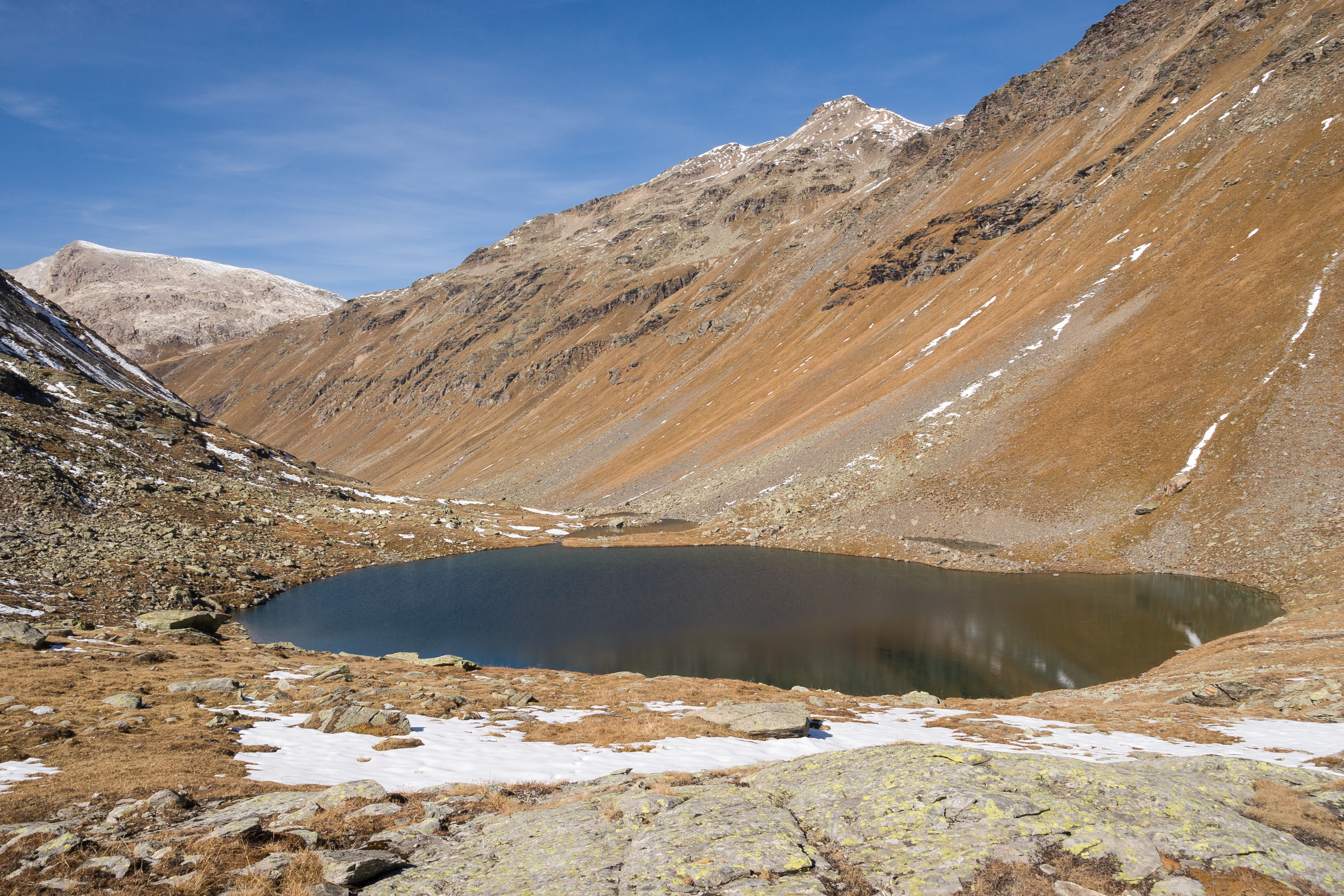

- Location within Canton of Graubünden Location within Switzerland Location within Italy Location within Alps
- Interactive map of Lej Minor
- Location: Val Minor, Pontresina, Grisons
- Coordinates: 46°26′01″N 10°02′12″E
- Basin countries: Switzerland
- Surface elevation: 2,361 m (7,746 ft)

This small mountain lake lies within Val Minor on the border with Italy, at an elevation of 2,361 m (7,746 ft). A hike to the lake usually starts at Bernina Pass.
