= Piz Alv =

Piz Alv (Romansh: "white peak") is the name of several mountains in Switzerland:

- Piz Bianco, a prominence north of Piz Bernina
- Piz Alv (Lepontine Alps), the tripoint between the cantons of Uri, Graubünden and Ticino
- Piz Alv (Oberhalbstein Alps), near Innerferrera in Graubünden
- Piz Alv (Livigno Alps), near Pontresina in Graubünden
