= Morteratsch =

Morteratsch refers to several locations in the Graubünden canton of Switzerland:

- Morteratsch Glacier
- Piz Morteratsch, a mountain (3751 m)
- Val Morteratsch, a valley
- Morteratsch railway station, a station of the Berninabahn, a railway line going from St. Moritz to Tirano
