= Bernino =

Bernino relates to several articles and is the male simple form of pluralis Bernini (Italian family name):

- Bernino (mountain pass), a mountain pass in Switzerland
- Bernini, an Italian family name, most famous is the artist Gian Lorenzo Bernini which works include decorations for the St. Peter's Church in Rome
