= Piz Alv (Livigno Alps) =

Mountain in Switzerland

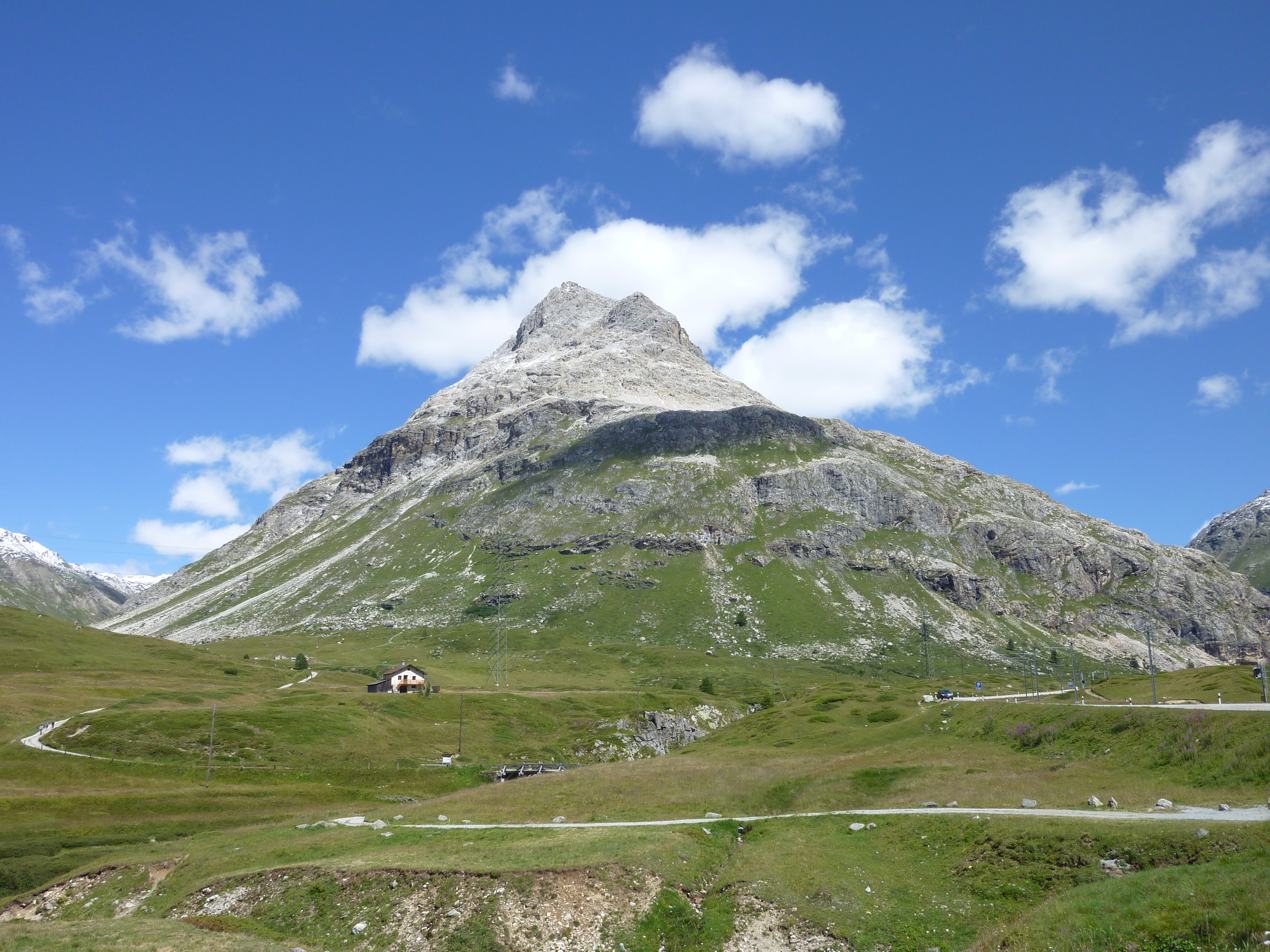
- View from the south-west side

Highest point
- Elevation: 2,975 m (9,760 ft)
- Prominence: 223 m (732 ft)
- Parent peak: Piz Minor
- Coordinates: 46°26′57.5″N 9°59′58.5″E

Geography
- Location within Switzerland
- Location: Graubünden, Switzerland
- Parent range: Livigno Alps

Piz Alv is a mountain of the Swiss Livigno Alps, located south-east of Pontresina in the canton of Graubünden. It lies in the group culminating at Piz Minor.
