= Surovas railway station =

Railway station in Switzerland

Surovas
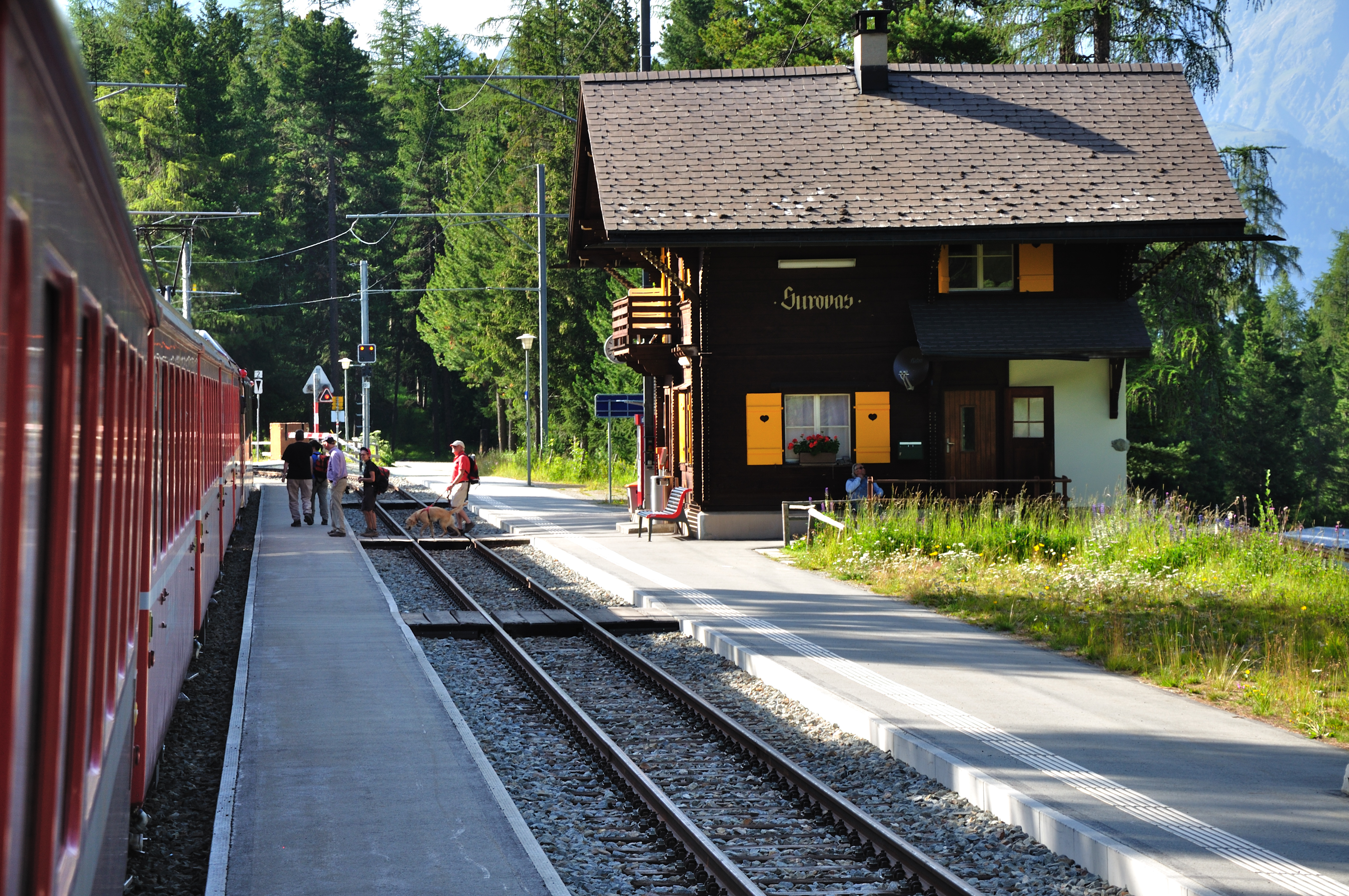
- The station in 2011

General information
- Location: Via da Surovas; 7504 Pontresina; Pontresina; Switzerland
- Coordinates: 46°29′08″N 9°54′20″E
- Elevation: 1,823 m (5,981 ft)
- Owner: Rhaetian Railway
- Line: Bernina line
- Distance: 7.4 km (4.6 mi) from St. Moritz
- Train operators: Rhaetian Railway

Other information
- Fare zone: 30 (Engadin Mobil)

History
- Opened: 1 July 1908

Passengers
- 2018: 110 per weekday

Services
Preceding station	Rhaetian Railway	Following station
Pontresina towards St. Moritz	RE 9	Morteratsch towards Tirano
Pontresina towards St. Moritz	R 19	Morteratsch towards Tirano
Location

Surovas railway station is a railway station in the municipality of Pontresina, in the Swiss canton of Graubünden. It is located on the Bernina line of the Rhaetian Railway.

The station has a two through tracks and two platforms with a station building.

== Services ==
As of the December 2023 timetable change, the following services stop at Surovas:

- RegioExpress / Regio: hourly service between St. Moritz and Tirano.
