= Bernina Diavolezza railway station =

Railway station in Switzerland

Bernina Diavolezza
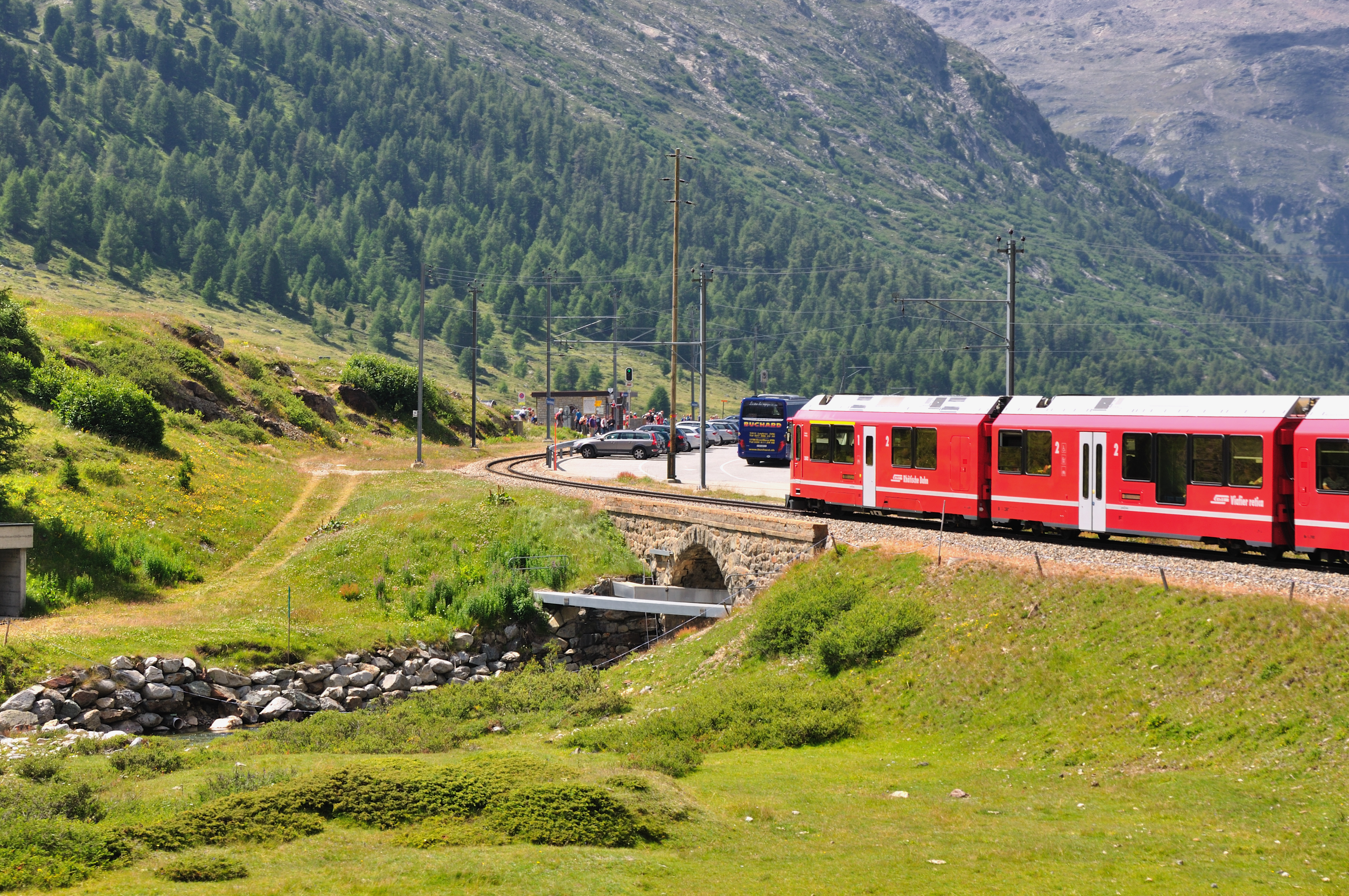
- A train arrives at the station in 2011

General information
- Location: Pontresina; Switzerland
- Coordinates: 46°26′30″N 9°58′56″E
- Elevation: 2,081 m (6,827 ft)
- Owner: Rhaetian Railway
- Line: Bernina line
- Distance: 16.8 km (10.4 mi) from St. Moritz
- Train operators: Rhaetian Railway
- Connections: PostAuto Schweiz and Engadin Bus

Other information
- Fare zone: 32 (Engadin Mobil)

History
- Opened: 5 July 1910

Passengers
- 2018: 340 per weekday

Services
Preceding station	Rhaetian Railway	Following station
Pontresina towards Chur or St. Moritz	Bernina Express	Alp Grüm towards Tirano
Bernina Suot towards St. Moritz	RE 9	Bernina Lagalb towards Tirano
Bernina Suot towards St. Moritz	R 19	Bernina Lagalb towards Tirano
Location

Bernina Diavolezza railway station is a railway station in the municipality of Pontresina, in the Swiss canton of Graubünden. It is located on the Bernina line of the Rhaetian Railway, at the foot of the Diavolezza mountain, as well as near the Diavolezza and Lagalb ski region.

The station has a single through track with a single platform and station building. The valley station for a cable car to the top of Diavolezza is located across the street from station. In the summer trailheads for hiking are located nearby.

The station was opened in 1956, at the same time as the adjacent cable car, and was originally also a passing station. However it relinquished that role to Bernina Lagalb when that station was opened.

== Services ==
As of the December 2023 timetable change, the following services stop at Bernina Diavolezza:

- Bernina Express: Several round-trips per day between Chur or St. Moritz and Tirano.
- RegioExpress / Regio: hourly service between St. Moritz and Tirano.
