= Piz Alv (Lepontine Alps) =

Mountain in Switzerland

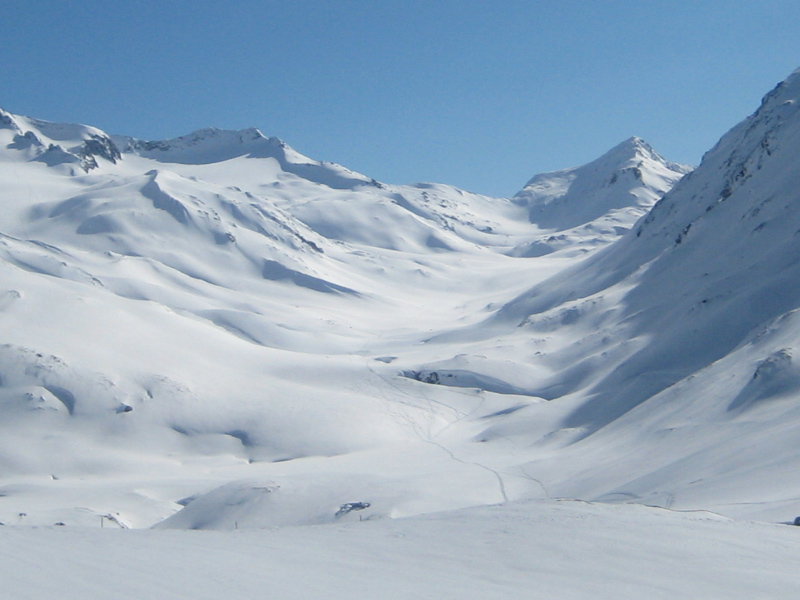
- Piz Alv (right summit) from Val Maighels (north side)

Highest point
- Elevation: 2,769 m (9,085 ft)
- Prominence: 92 m (302 ft)
- Parent peak: Pizzo Barbarera
- Coordinates: 46°34′44.8″N 8°40′43.3″E

Geography
- Location within Switzerland
- Location: Graubünden/Ticino/Uri, Switzerland
- Parent range: Lepontine Alps

Piz Alv is a mountain of the Lepontine Alps in Switzerland. The summit is the tripoint between the cantons of Uri (Unteralp valley), Graubünden (Val Maighels) and Ticino (Val Canaria).
