= Morteratsch railway station =

Swiss railway station

Morteratsch
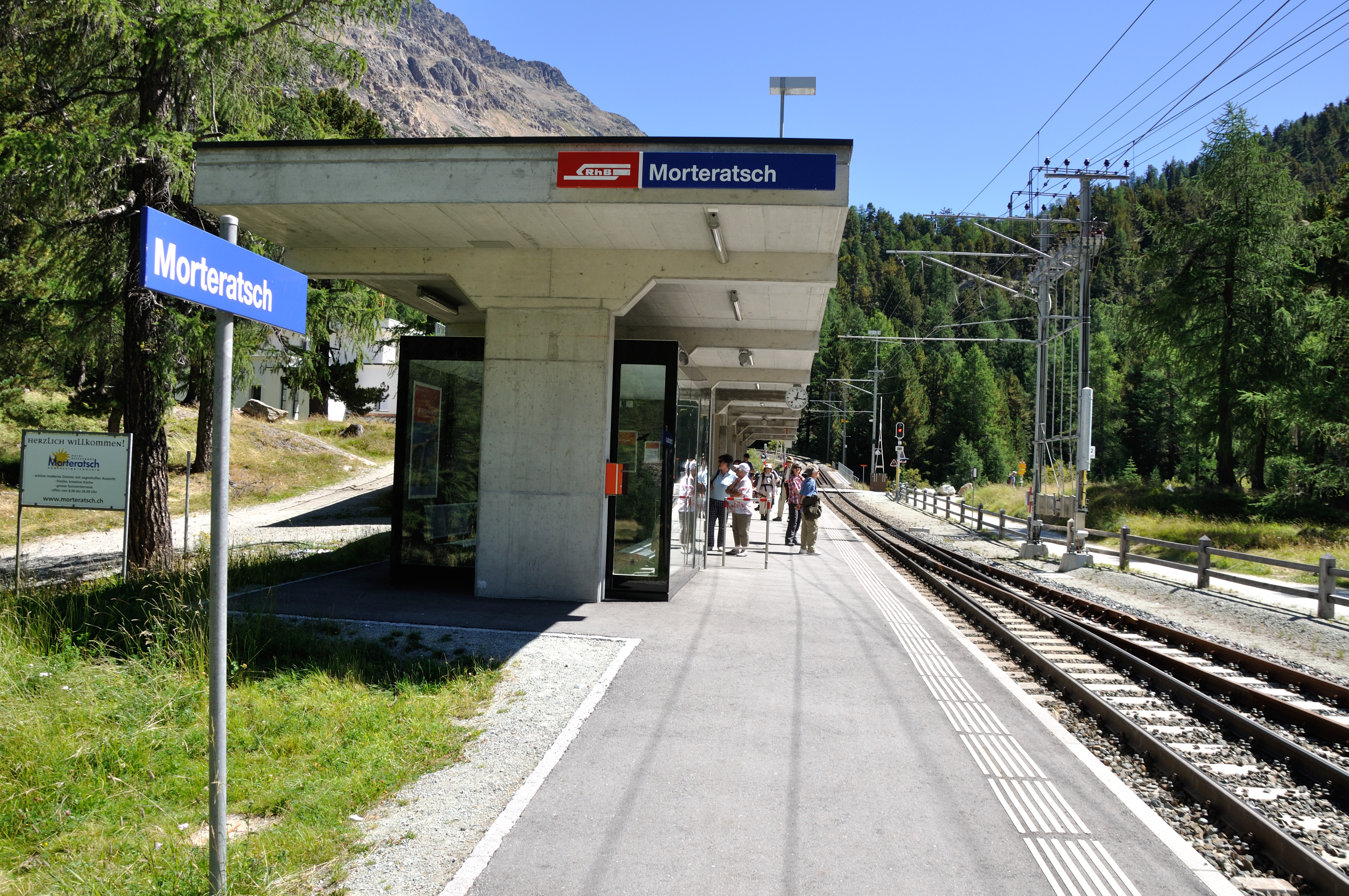
- The station platform in 2012

General information
- Location: Pontresina; Switzerland
- Coordinates: 46°27′03″N 9°56′25″E
- Elevation: 1,896 m (6,220 ft)
- Owner: Rhaetian Railway
- Line: Bernina line
- Distance: 12.2 km (7.6 mi) from St. Moritz
- Train operators: Rhaetian Railway

Other information
- Fare zone: 31 (Engadin Mobil)

History
- Opened: 1 July 1908

Passengers
- 2018: 460 per weekday

Services
Preceding station	Rhaetian Railway	Following station
Surovas towards St. Moritz	RE 9	Bernina Suot towards Tirano
Surovas towards St. Moritz	R 19	Bernina Suot towards Tirano
Location

Morteratsch railway station is a railway station in the municipality of Pontresina, in the Swiss canton of Graubünden. It is located on the Bernina line of the Rhaetian Railway. The Morteratsch Glacier lies some 3 km (1.9 mi) to the south of the station and can be reached by a marked hiking trail.

The station has a single through track and a single platform with a station building. There is a siding in the station, and a passing loop just outside the station in the northbound direction. In the southbound direction the line passes over the Ova da Morteratsch on a railway bridge immediately after the station platform, and then over the Ova da Bernina on a viaduct some 200 m (660 ft) later.

The Hotel-Restaurant Morteratsch, which adjoins the station to the north, predates the railway. When it was built it was very close to the tongue of the glacier, which has since receded due to global warming, and benefited from significant tourist traffic. As a result, the line from Pontresina was opened in 1908, and the station was the terminus of the line until the section over the Bernina pass was opened in 1910. Even then it was originally intended as the winter terminus of the line, with the line over the pass operating only during the summer months, a situation that continued until it was decided to open the line throughout starting with the winter of 1913/4.

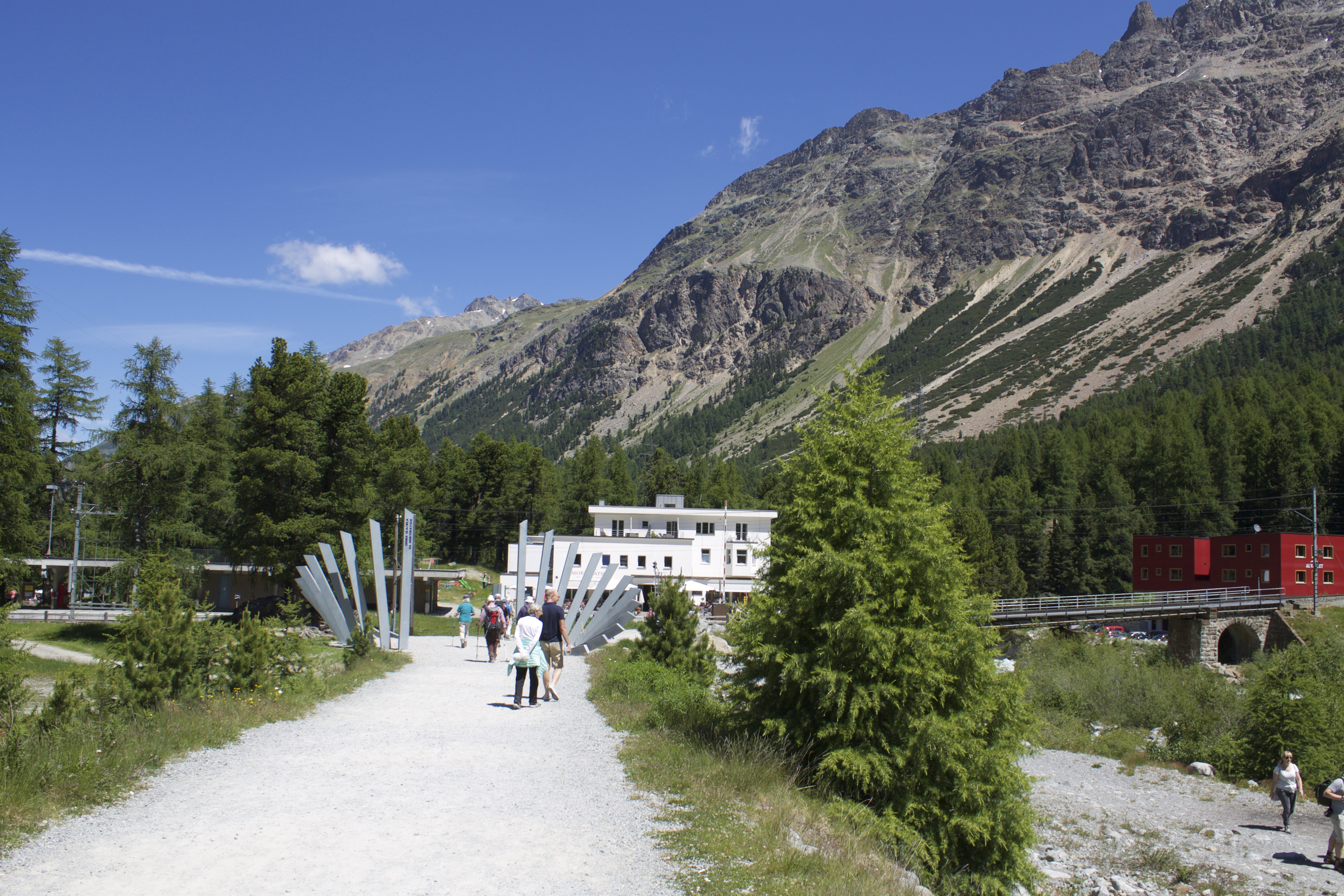
A view facing north, with the station to the left, hotel centre, and railway bridge to the right

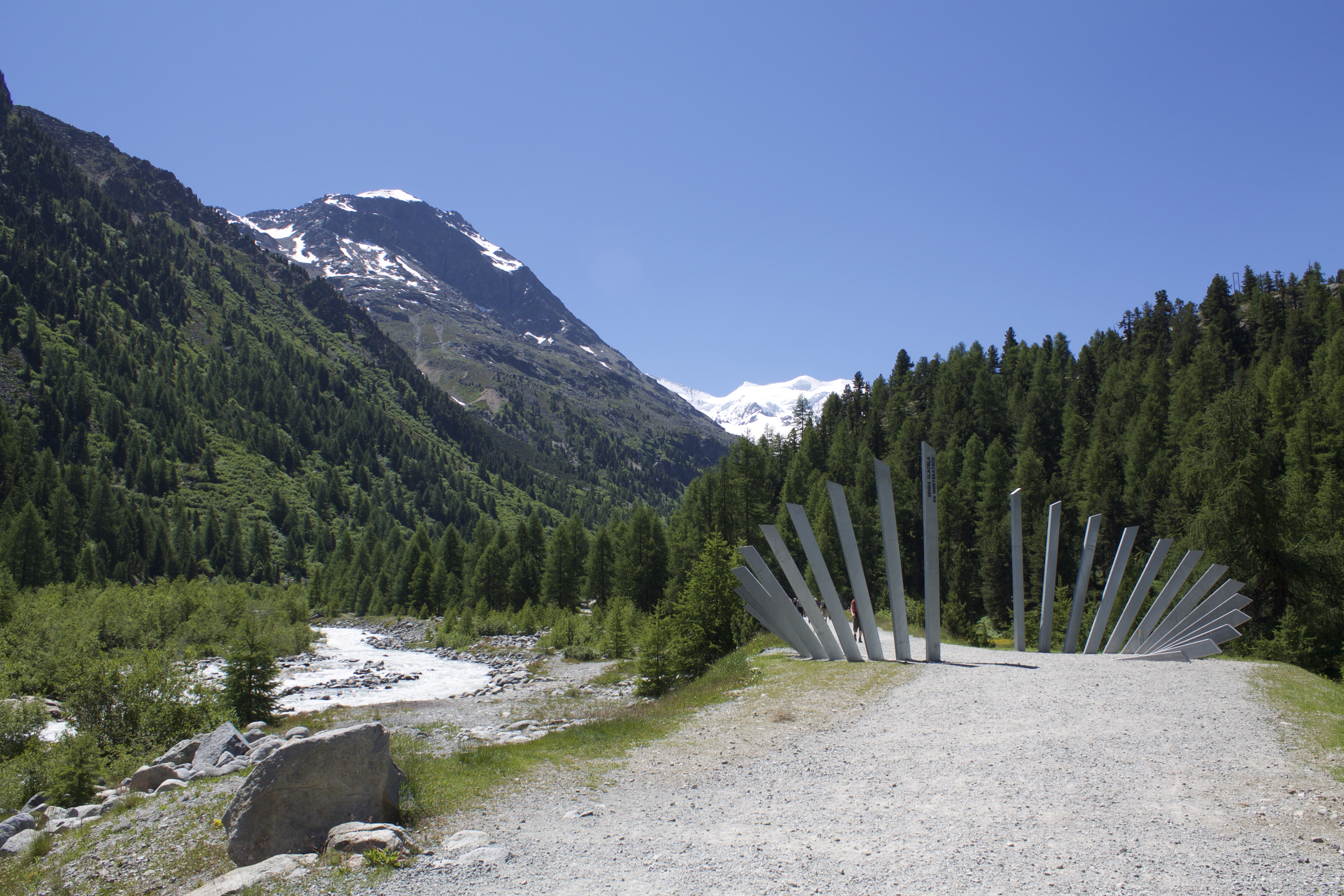
A view facing south along the Val Morteratsch towards the glacier, with the Ova da Morteratsch to the left

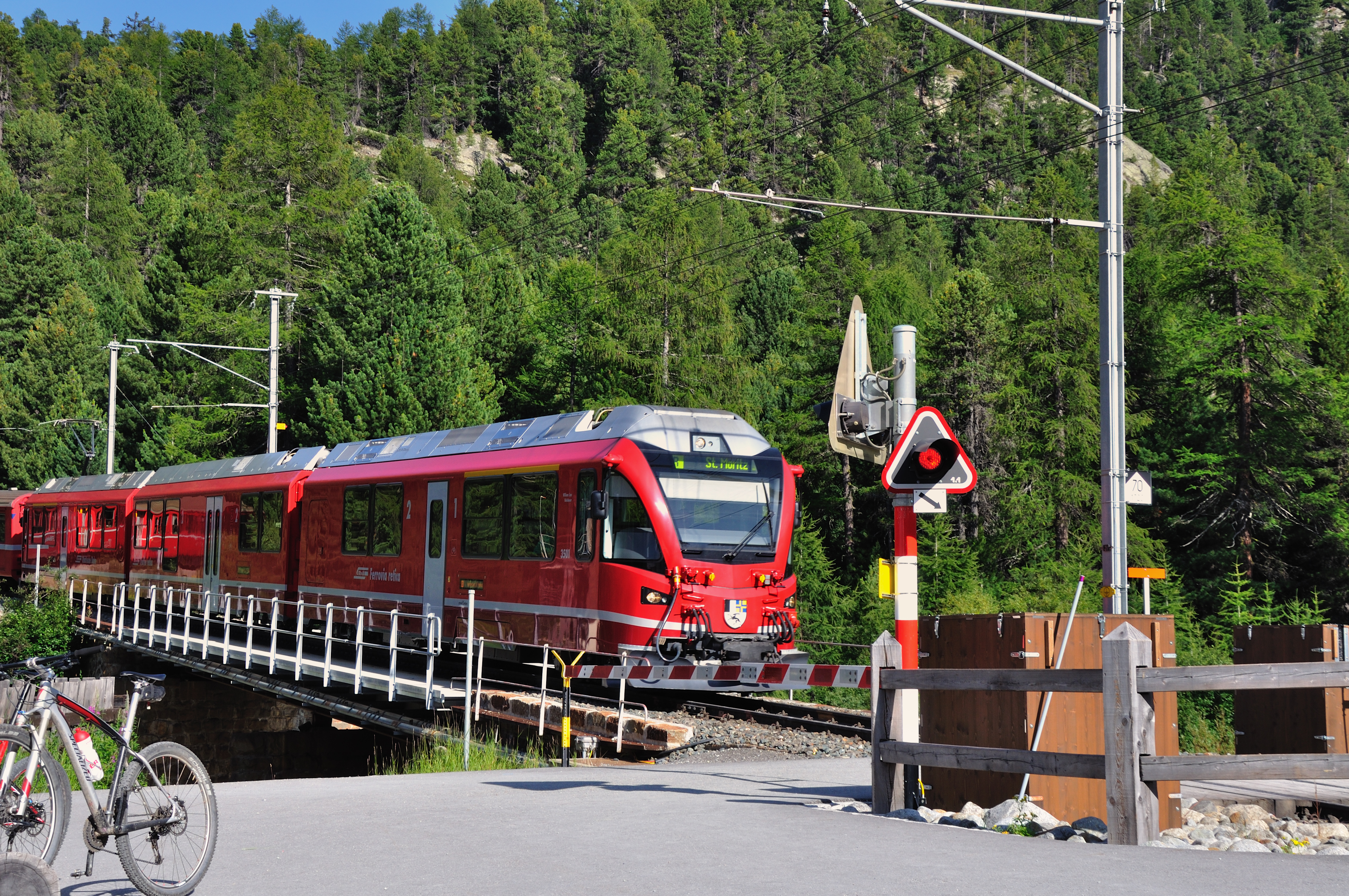
An ABe 8/12 Allegra entering the station over the bridge across the Ova da Morteratsch

== Services ==
As of the December 2023 timetable change, the following services stop at Morteratsch:

- RegioExpress / Regio: hourly service between St. Moritz and Tirano.
