= Bernina Lagalb railway station =

Railway station in Switzerland

Bernina Lagalb
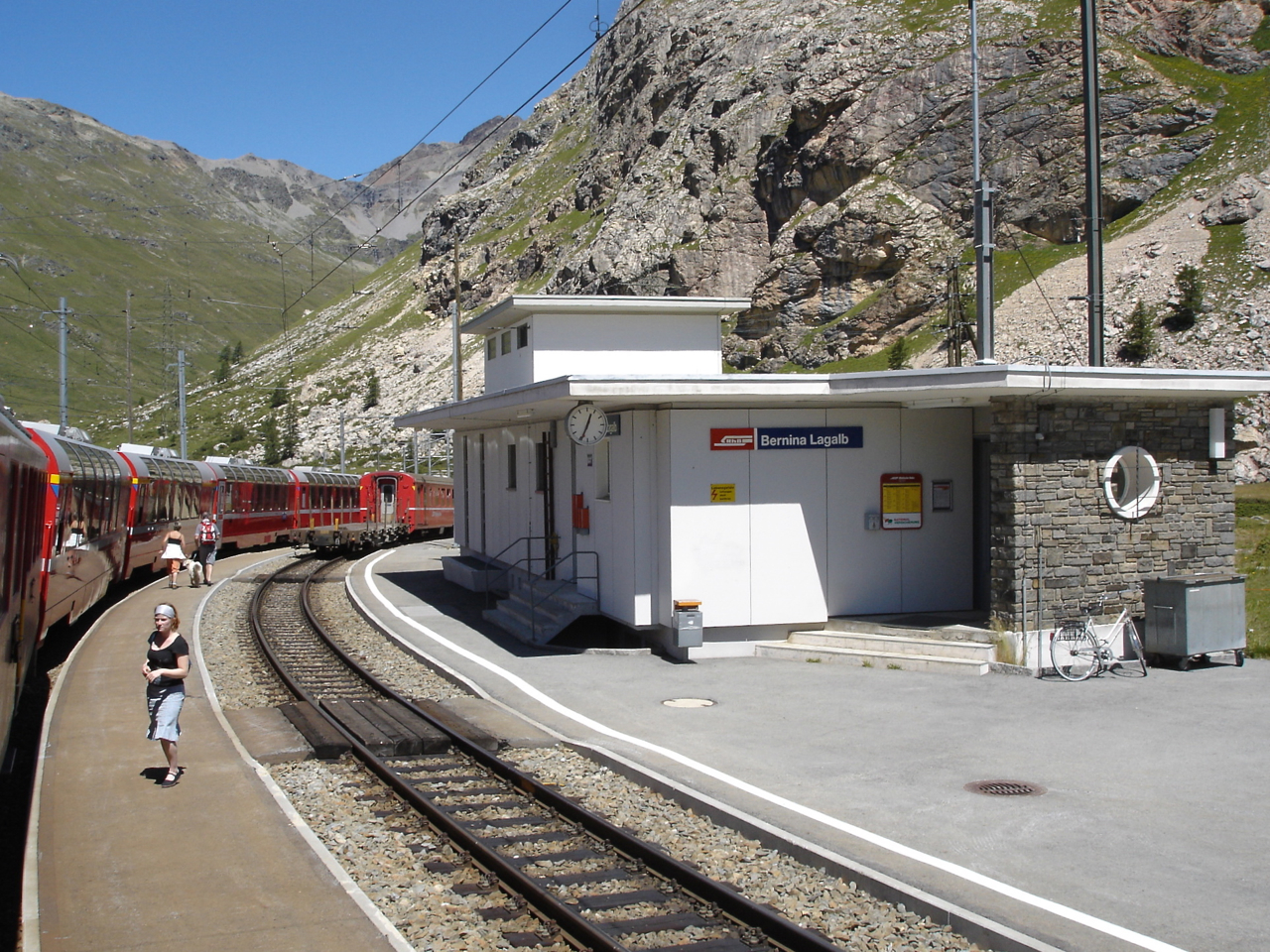
- A train at the station in 2007

General information
- Location: Pontresina; Switzerland
- Coordinates: 46°26′12″N 9°59′31″E
- Elevation: 2,099 m (6,886 ft)
- Owner: Rhaetian Railway
- Line: Bernina line
- Distance: 17.9 km (11.1 mi) from St. Moritz
- Train operators: Rhaetian Railway
- Connections: PostAuto Schweiz and Engadin Bus

Other information
- Fare zone: 32 (Engadin Mobil)

History
- Opened: 5 July 1910

Passengers
- 2018: 50 per weekday

Services
Preceding station	Rhaetian Railway	Following station
Bernina Diavolezza towards St. Moritz	RE 9	Ospizio Bernina towards Tirano
Bernina Diavolezza towards St. Moritz	R 19	Ospizio Bernina towards Tirano
Location

Bernina Lagalb railway station is a railway station in the municipality of Pontresina, in the Swiss canton of Graubünden. It is located on the Bernina line of the Rhaetian Railway.

The station has three through tracks, only two of which are served by its two platforms and station building. The lower station of the cableway to Piz Lagalb is some 200 m (660 ft) away.

The station was opened in 1962, at the same time as the adjacent cable car. The station is situated on the lowest part of a 2.2 km (1.4 mi) deviation created in 1934, when the line as far as the Arlas Gallery was moved to the west side of the valley in order to avoid the risk of avalanches. Before that date, the line ran alongside the road and a memorial on the old route honours eight railway workers who lost their lives in an avalanche in 1920.

== Services ==
As of the December 2023 timetable change, the following services stop at Bernina Lagalb:

- RegioExpress / Regio: hourly service between St. Moritz and Tirano.
