= Bernina Suot railway station =

Swiss train station

Bernina Suot
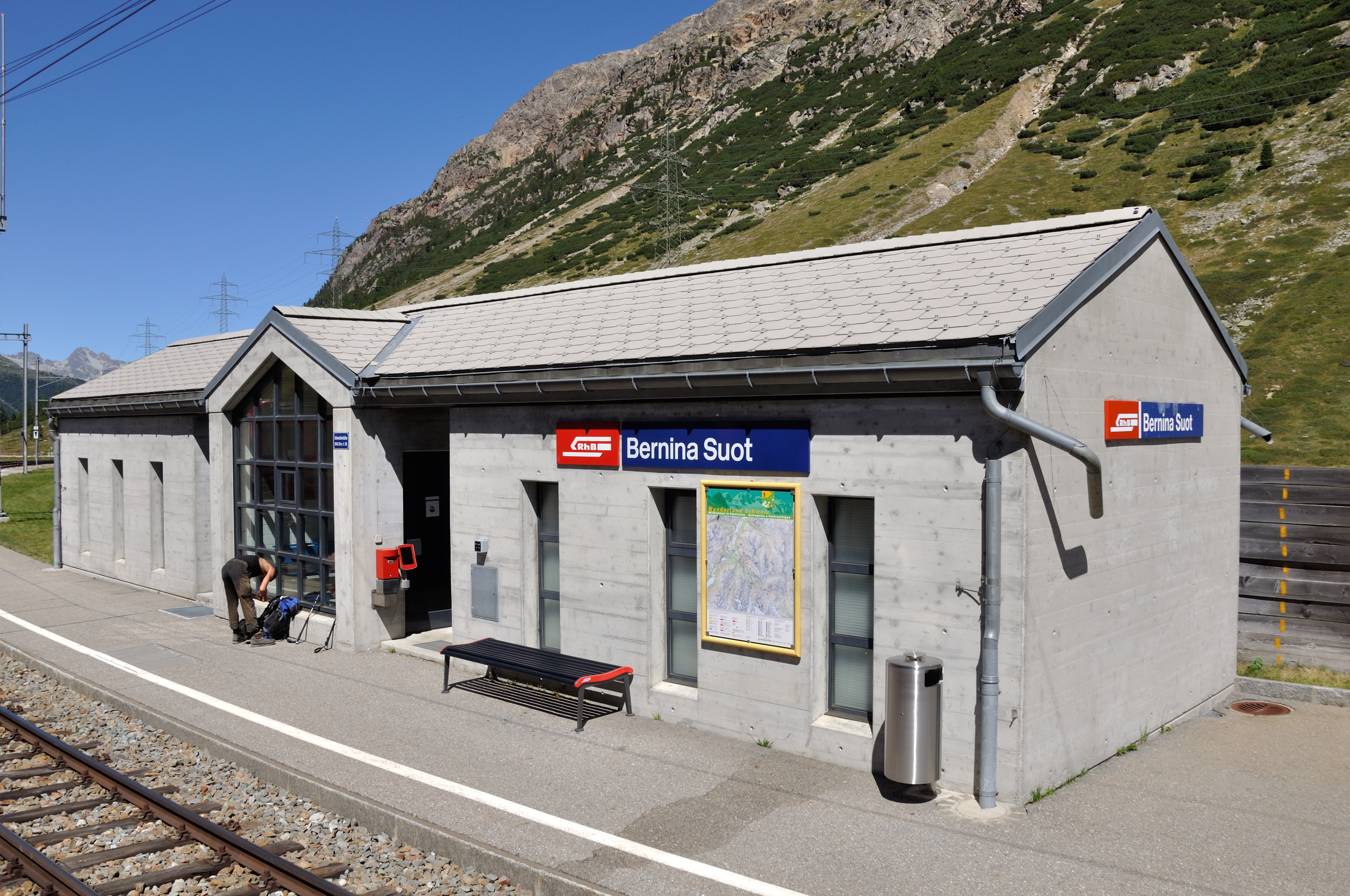
- The station building in 2012

General information
- Location: Pontresina; Switzerland
- Coordinates: 46°26′41″N 9°58′10″E
- Elevation: 2,052 m (6,732 ft)
- Owner: Rhaetian Railway
- Line: Bernina line
- Distance: 15.7 km (9.8 mi) from St. Moritz
- Train operators: Rhaetian Railway
- Connections: PostAuto Schweiz and Engadin Bus

Other information
- Fare zone: 32 (Engadin Mobil)

History
- Opened: 1 July 1909
- Former names: Bernina-Häuser

Passengers
- 2018: 50 per weekday

Services
Preceding station	Rhaetian Railway	Following station
Morteratsch towards St. Moritz	RE 9	Bernina Diavolezza towards Tirano
Morteratsch towards St. Moritz	R 19	Bernina Diavolezza towards Tirano
Location

Bernina Suot railway station, formerly known as Berninahäuser railway station, is a railway station in the municipality of Pontresina, in the Swiss canton of Graubünden. It is located on the Bernina line of the Rhaetian Railway.

The station has two through tracks and two platforms and a station building. There is also a siding, and an avalanche proof building housing a turntable for use by the line's snowploughs.

The station was opened with the line in 1910, but the railway line and station building were reconstructed in 1993.

== Services ==
As of the December 2023 timetable change, the following services stop at Bernina Suot:

- RegioExpress / Regio: hourly service between St. Moritz and Tirano.
