= Pontresina =

- Municipality
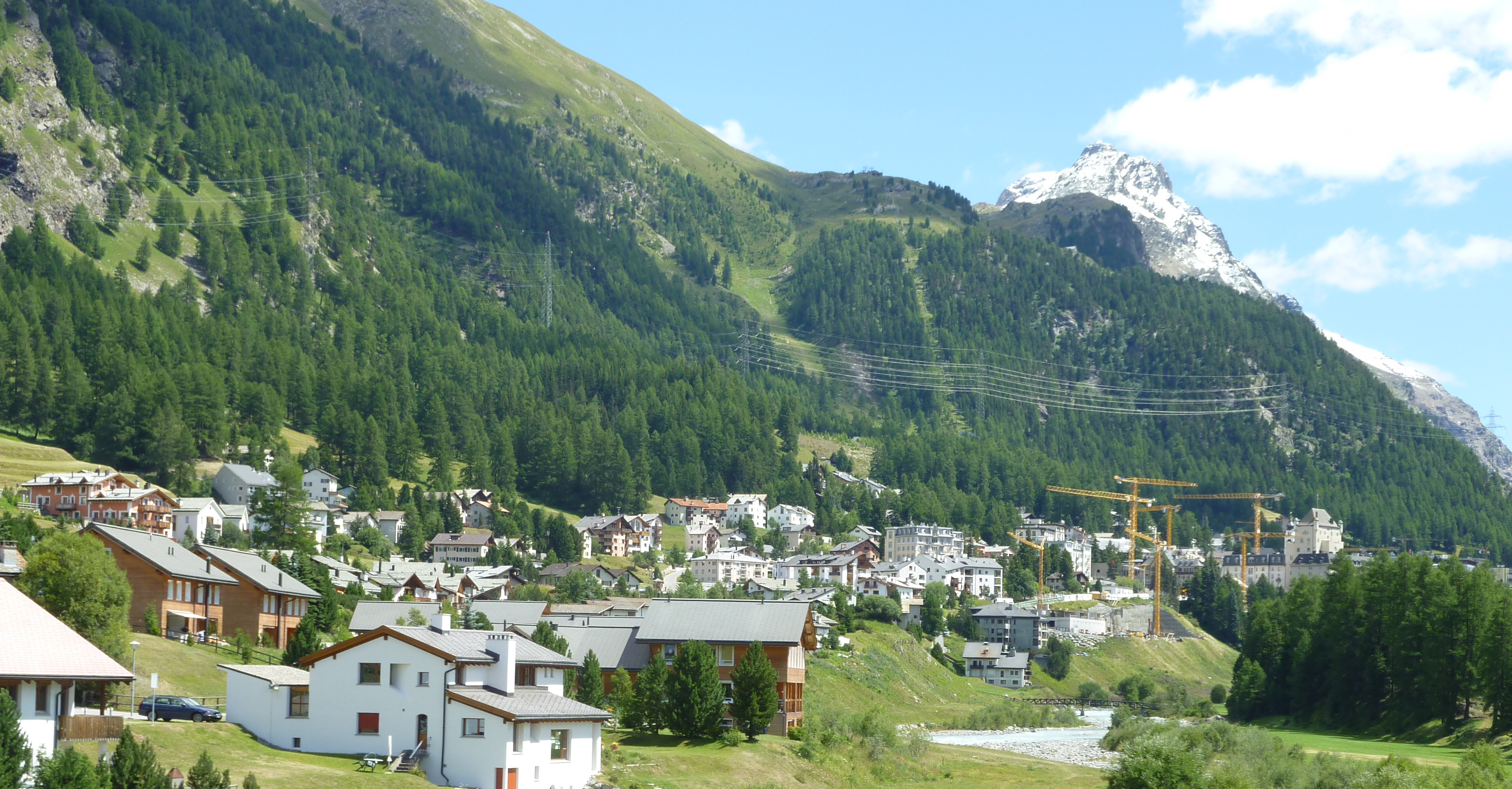
- Pontresina in August 2010

- Flag Coat of arms
- Location of Pontresina
- Location within Switzerland Location within Canton of Grisons
- Coordinates: 46°30′N 9°54′E
- Country: Switzerland
- Canton: Grisons
- District: Maloja

Area
  - Total: 118.24 km^{2} (45.65 sq mi)
- Elevation: 1,805 m (5,922 ft)

Population (December 2020)
  - Total: 2,178
  - Density: 18.42/km^{2} (47.71/sq mi)
- Time zone: UTC+01:00 (CET)
  - Summer (DST): UTC+02:00 (CEST)
- Postal code: 7504
- SFOS number: 3784
- ISO 3166 code: CH-GR
- Surrounded by: Lanzada (IT-SO), La Punt Chamues-ch, Livigno (IT-SO), Madulain, Poschiavo, Samedan, Zuoz
- Website: www.gemeinde-pontresina.ch

Pontresina (Romansh: Puntraschigna) is a municipality in the Maloja Region in the canton of the Grisons in Switzerland.

== History and name ==
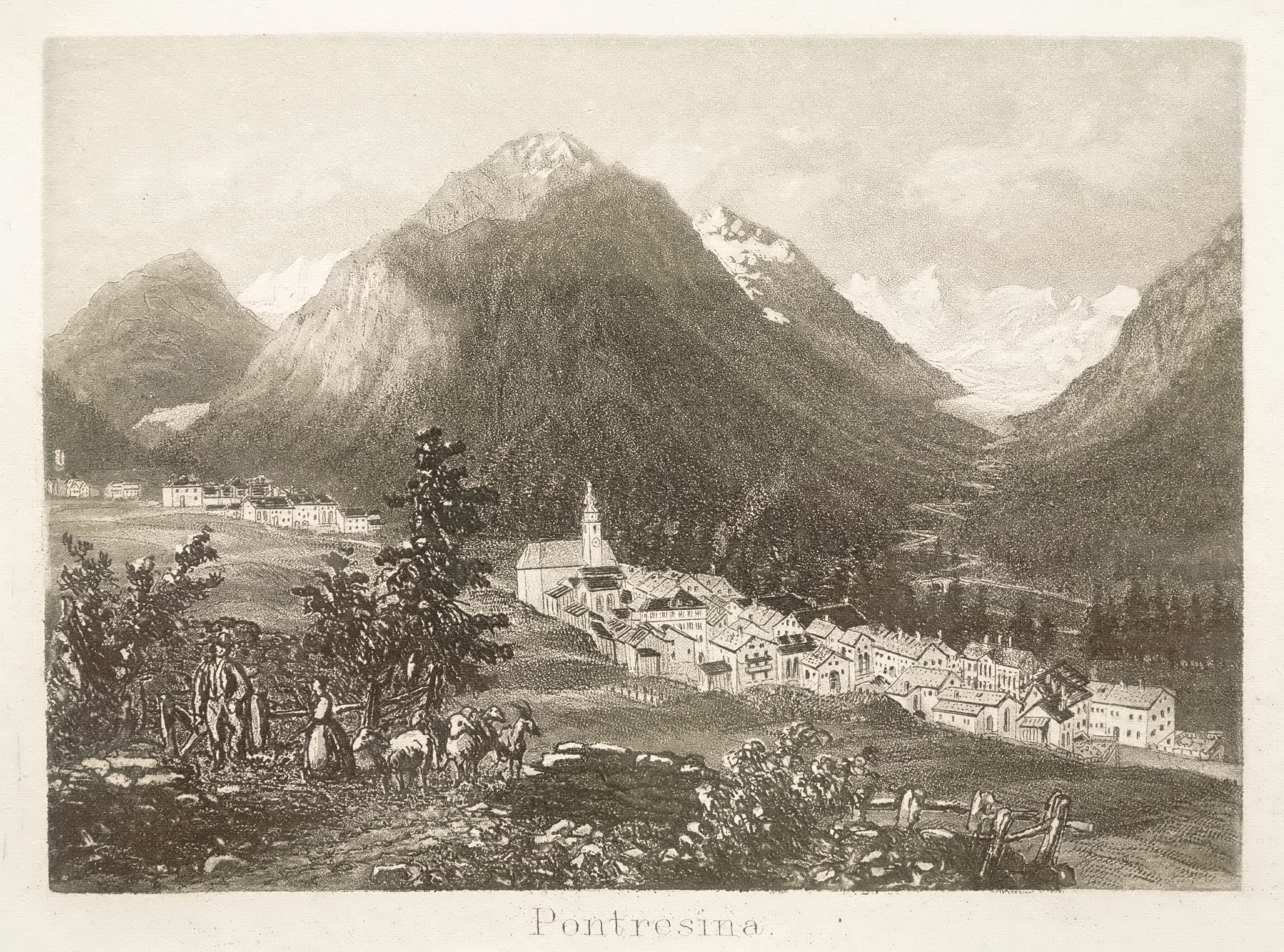
Pontresina c. 1870, with Val Roseg and Roseg Glacier. Etching by Heinrich Müller

Pontresina was first mentioned in medieval Latin documents as ad Pontem Sarisinam in 1137 and de Ponte Sarraceno in 1237. The name consists of the Latin word for bridge, pons (accusative form: pontem), and the male personal name Saracenus, which was widely known in the Engadin valley. The earlier assumption that the name was connected with the Saracens has been discarded.

Pontresina owes its importance to its location on the Bernina Pass and to tourism. In the Middle Ages, the place was more important than neighbouring St. Moritz. However, only a few buildings are reminiscent of this time, as Pontresina was hit by a major fire at the beginning of the 18th century. After the first inn was opened in 1850, tourism began to flourish. In the summer of 1885 there were already 2000 guests. In 1908, the resort received a further boost with the opening of the Bernina Railway.

== Geography ==
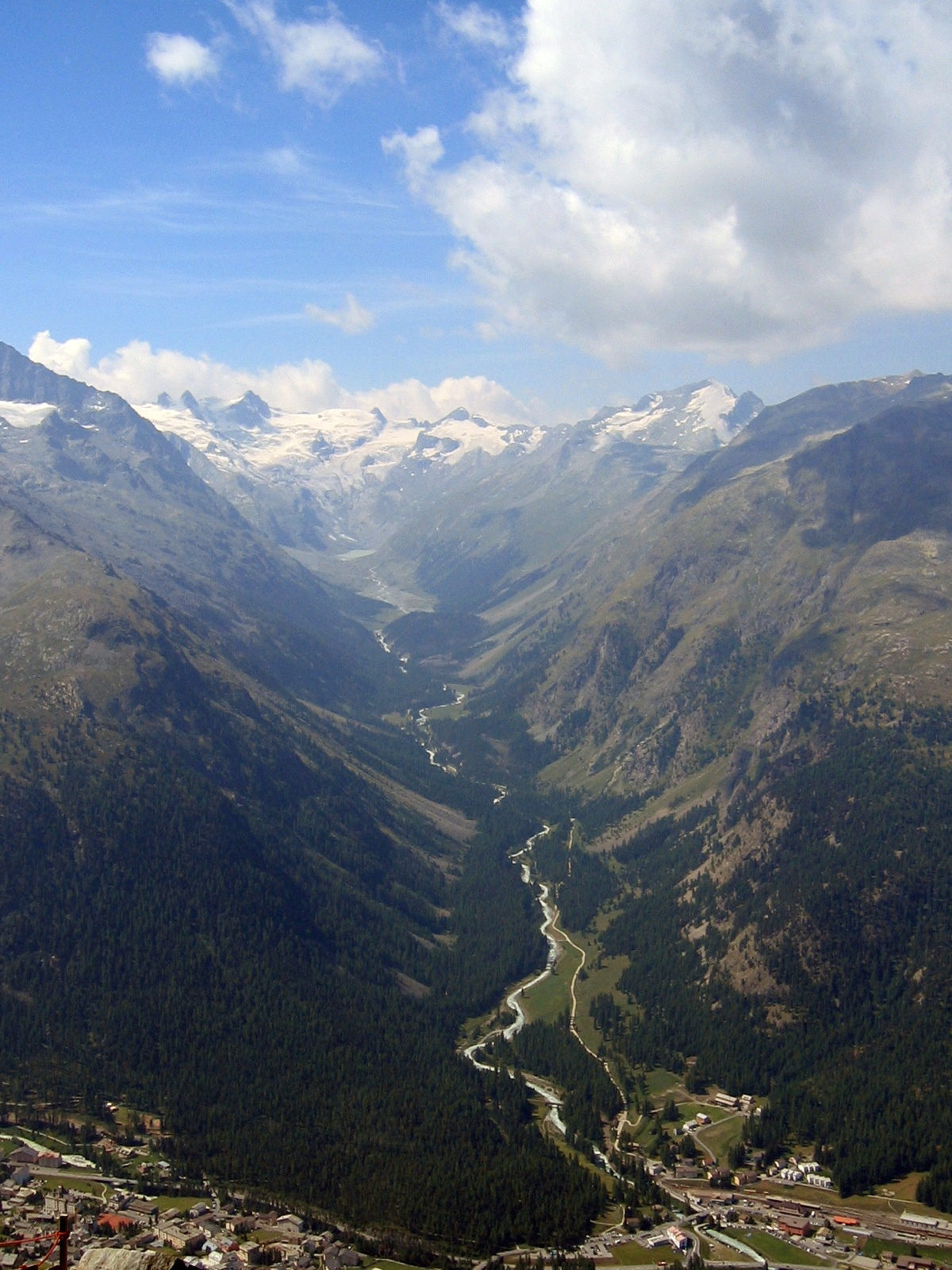
Pontresina and the Roseg Valley (Val Roseg)

Aerial view from 300 m by Walter Mittelholzer (1919)

Pontresina has an area, as of 2006, of 118.2 km^{2} (45.6 sq mi). Of this area, 16.7% is used for agricultural purposes, while 8.8% is forested. Of the rest of the land, 1.6% is settled (buildings or roads) and the remainder (72.9%) is non-productive (rivers, glaciers or mountains).

Before 2017, the municipality was located in the Oberengadin sub-district of the Maloja district, after 2017 it was part of the Maloja Region. It sits in Val Bernina, which is the highest altitude valley that branches off the Upper Engadin Valley. The municipality includes the highest mountain of the canton, Piz Bernina. Other high summits are Piz Zupò and Piz Palü. Pontresina is a noted tourist destination in its own right, but is often overshadowed by its more famous neighbor St. Moritz.

It consists of the old village sections of Laret, San Spiert as well as Giarsun and the new sections on the mountain slopes (including Muragls).

Nearby glaciers include the Morteratsch Glacier and the Roseg Glacier. The Morteratsch has a ski lift and a long run down the glacier and the glacier is an economic mainstay of the town. The Roseg Valley has a groomed cross country ski trail along its length.

== Twin town ==
Pontresina is twinned with Gaylord, Michigan.

== Demographics ==
Pontresina has a population (as of 31 December 2020) of 2,178. As of 2008, 29.7% of the population was made up of foreign nationals. Over the last 10 years the population has grown at a rate of 3.9%.

As of 2000, the gender distribution of the population was 50.2% male and 49.8% female. The age distribution, as of 2000, in Pontresina is; 165 children or 7.5% of the population are between 0 and 9 years old. 95 teenagers or 4.3% are 10 to 14, and 136 teenagers or 6.2% are 15 to 19. Of the adult population, 438 people or 20.0% of the population are between 20 and 29 years old. 435 people or 19.9% are 30 to 39, 354 people or 16.2% are 40 to 49, and 269 people or 12.3% are 50 to 59. The senior population distribution is 153 people or 7.0% of the population are between 60 and 69 years old, 97 people or 4.4% are 70 to 79, there are 45 people or 2.1% who are 80 to 89, and there are 4 people or 0.2% who are 90 to 99.

In the 2007 federal election the most popular party was the FDP which received 35.2% of the vote. The next three most popular parties were the SVP (34.1%), the SP (17%) and the CVP (8.1%).

In Pontresina about 62.6% of the population (between age 25-64) have completed either non-mandatory upper secondary education or additional higher education (either university or a Fachhochschule).

Pontresina has an unemployment rate of 1.26%. As of 2005, there were 19 people employed in the primary economic sector and about 4 businesses involved in this sector. 323 people are employed in the secondary sector and there are 22 businesses in this sector. 1,073 people are employed in the tertiary sector, with 124 businesses in this sector.

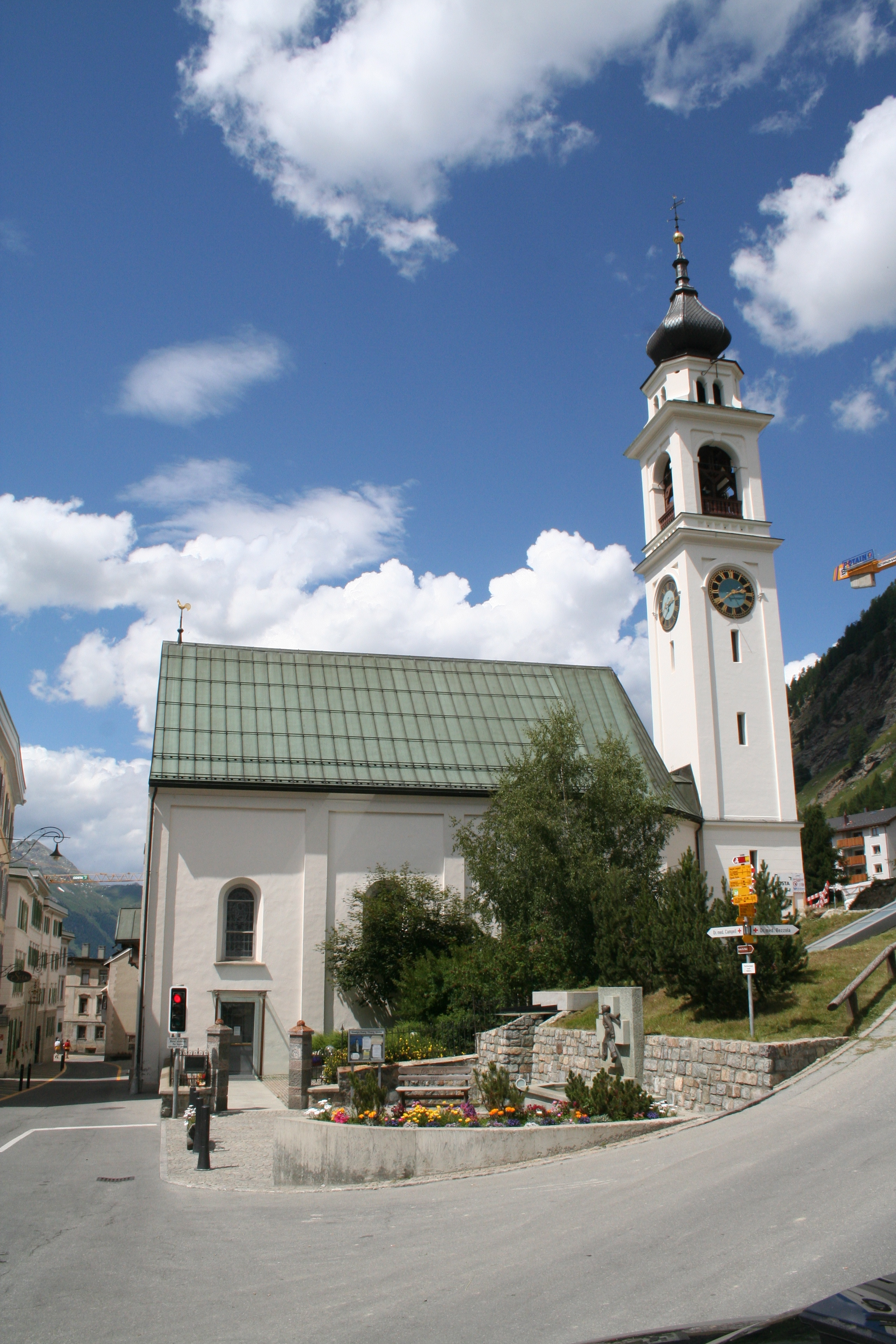
Reformed church of Niculò/Nikolaus, built in 1640, rebuilt in 1718, tower from 1887.

From the 2000 census, 1,055 or 48.2% are Roman Catholic, while 713 or 32.5% belonged to the Swiss Reformed Church. Of the rest of the population, there are 40 individuals (or about 1.83% of the population) who belong to the Orthodox Church, and there are 56 individuals (or about 2.56% of the population) who belong to another Christian church. There are less than 5 individuals who are Jewish, and 27 (or about 1.23% of the population) who are Islamic. There are 10 individuals (or about 0.46% of the population) who belong to another church (not listed on the census), 158 (or about 7.21% of the population) belong to no church, are agnostic or atheist, and 132 individuals (or about 6.02% of the population) did not answer the question.

The historical population is given in the following table:

year	population
1850	270
1900	488
1950	774
1960	1,067
1970	1,646
1980	1,726
1990	1,604
2000	2,191

== Languages ==
Most of the population (as of 2000) speaks German (57.7%), with Italian being second most common (16.1%) and Portuguese being third (9.0%). Until the 19th century, the entire population spoke the Upper-Engadin Romansh dialect of Putèr. Due to increasing trade with the outside world, Romansh usage began to decline. In 1880, still 45.7% of the population spoke Romansh as a first language, decreasing to only 33.61% in 1900. The Romansh language continues to decline without an interruption (1941 26.7%, 1970 16.22%, 2000 7.94%).

Languages in Pontresina GR
Languages	Census 1980		Census 1990		Census 2000	
Languages	Number	Percent	Number	Percent	Number	Percent
German	990	57.36%	993	61.91%	1264	57.69%
Romansh	250	14.48%	194	12.09%	174	7.94%
Italian	362	20.97%	290	18.08%	353	16.11%
Population	1726	100%	1604	100%	2191	100%

== Transportation ==
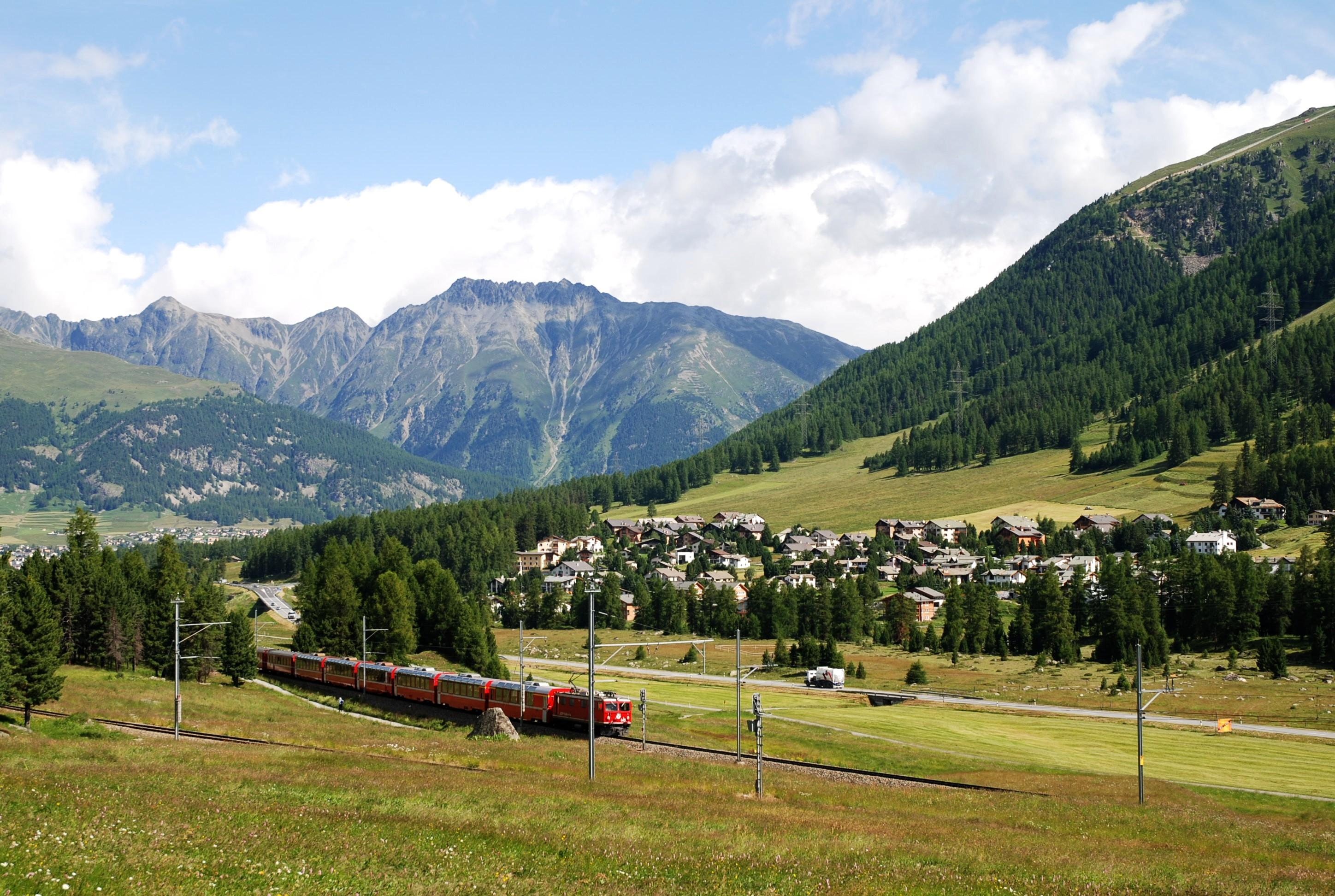
Train of the Rhaetian Railway in Pontresina

Pontresina railway station is a fair-sized facility positioned to the west of the town which serves a wide area and a youth hostel. It is located on the Bernina line and has regular service to St. Moritz and Tirano. There are five additional railway stations within the municipality, all on the Bernina line: Surovas, Morteratsch, Bernina Suot, Bernina Lagalb, and Bernina Diavolezza.

Hauptstrasse 29, the main road across the Bernina Pass, runs the length of the municipality, but bypasses the village of Pontresina to the west, passing between the village and railway station. It and linking roads provide links to the neighbouring, larger town of St Moritz. Several bus lines of the Engadin Bus company also serve the area and there is a chair lift for skiing in the winter months, and walking in the summer months.

== Weather ==
Pontresina has an average of 97.8 days of rain per year and on average receives 799 mm (31.5 in) of precipitation. The wettest month is August during which time Pontresina receives an average of 104 mm (4.1 in) of precipitation. During this month there is precipitation for an average of 10.7 days. The driest month of the year is February with an average of 31 mm (1.2 in) of precipitation over 10.7 days.

== Heritage sites of national significance ==
The Church of S. Maria, Grand Hotel Kronenhof and the Spaniola tower are listed as Swiss heritage sites of national significance. The old parish church and currently a village church of S. Maria is a late-Romanesque structure. The church has several significant paintings on the walls. The tower and north and west walls are from an earlier church, most likely from the 12th Century.

A historical transport route of wine across the alps passes Pontresina and continues towards Davos across Scaletta Pass that lost importance completely when roads were built elsewhere.

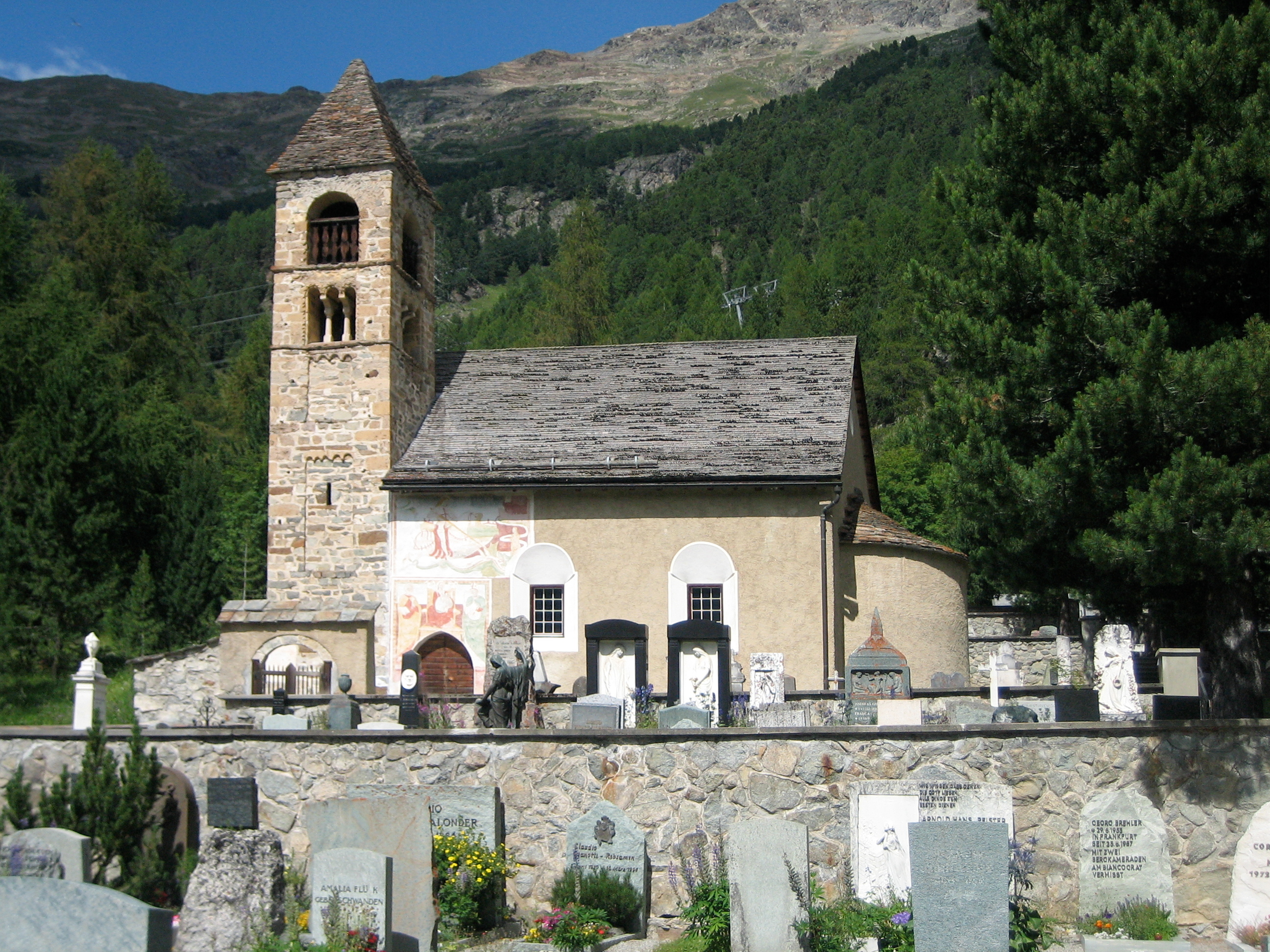
Church of Santa Maria

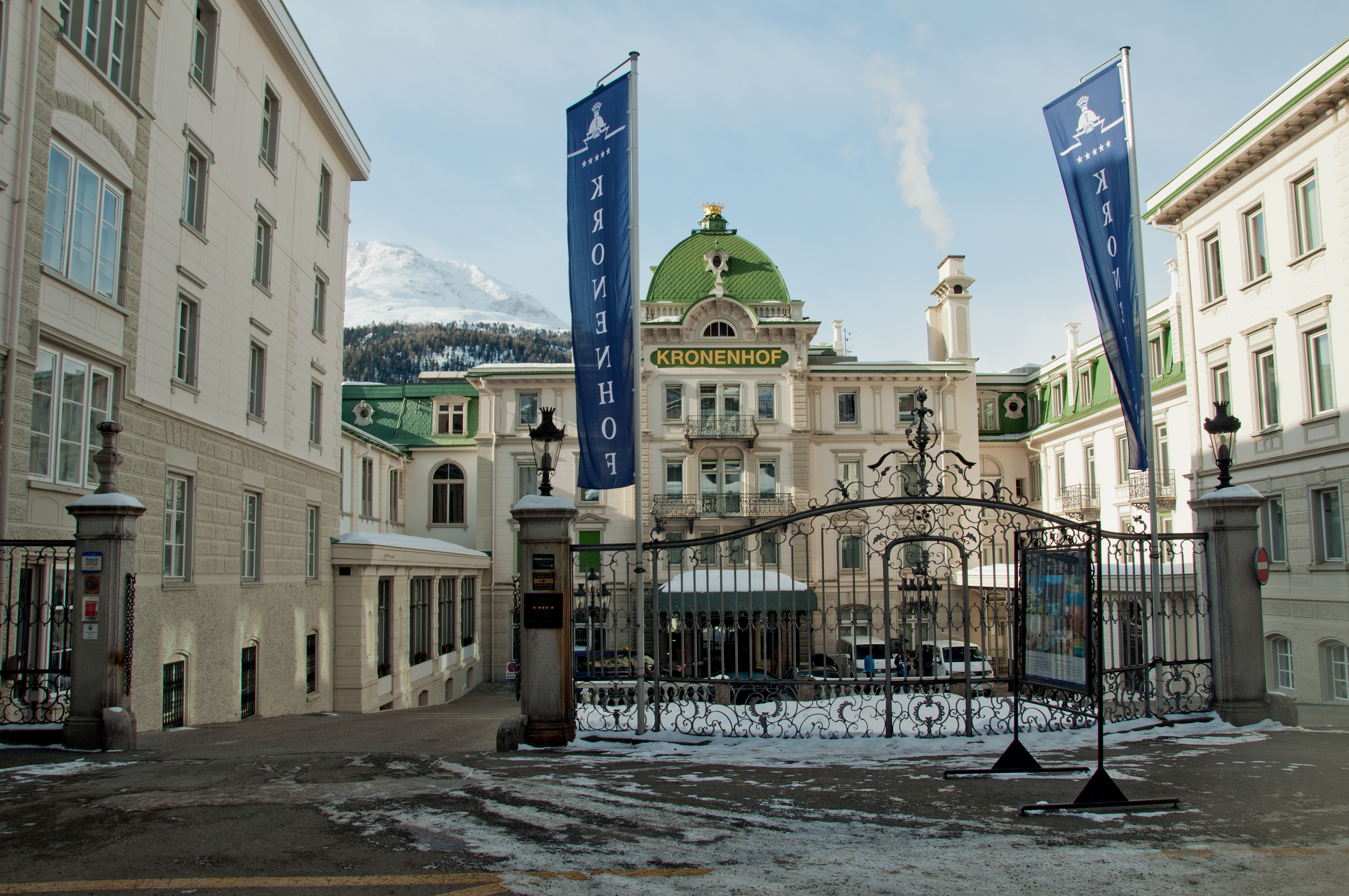
Grand Hotel Kronenhof

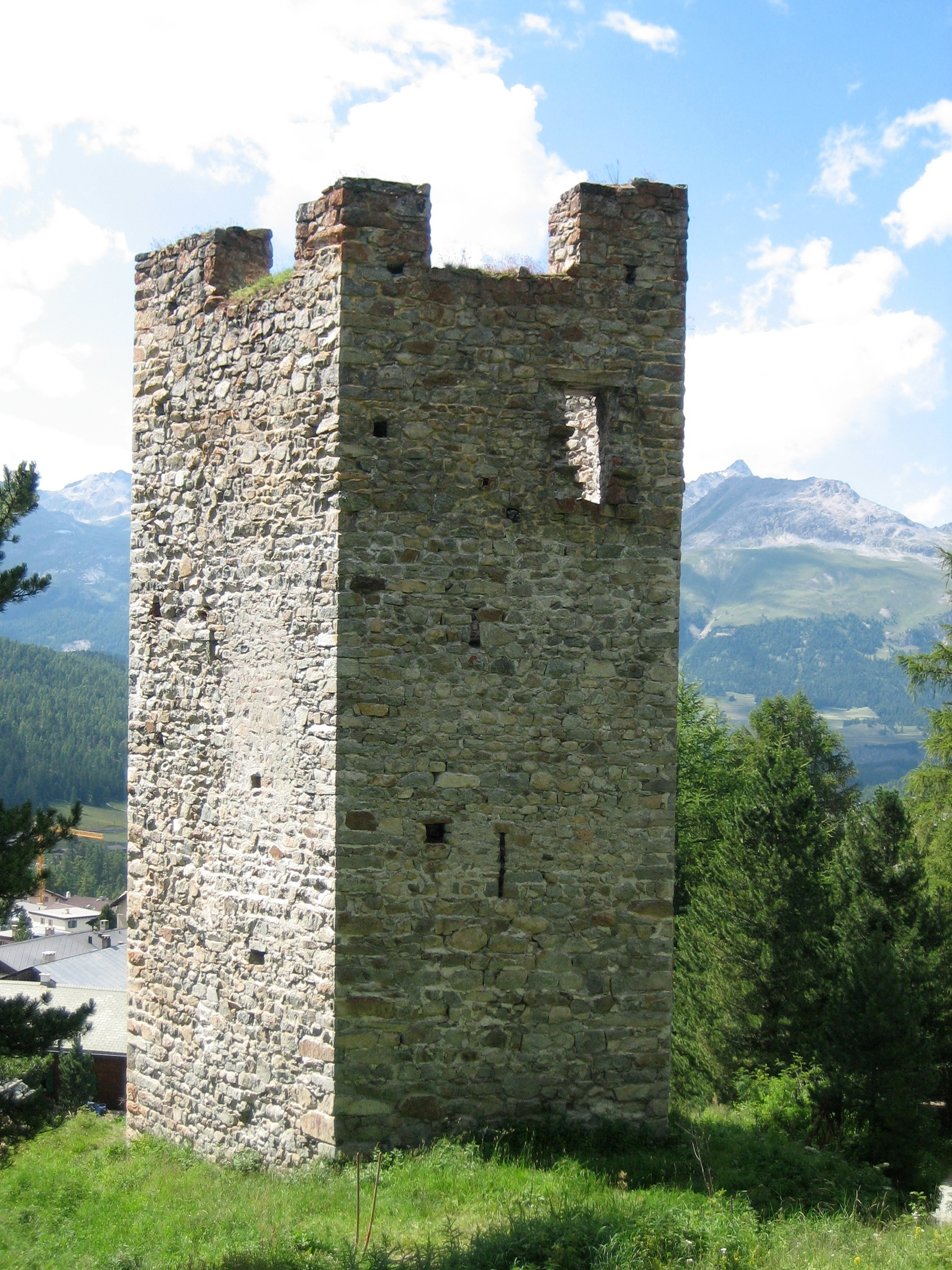
Spaniola Tower

== Notable people ==
- Toni Rüttimann (born 1967), bridge builder who works in Latin America and Southeast Asia
