= Piz Minor =

Mountain in Switzerland

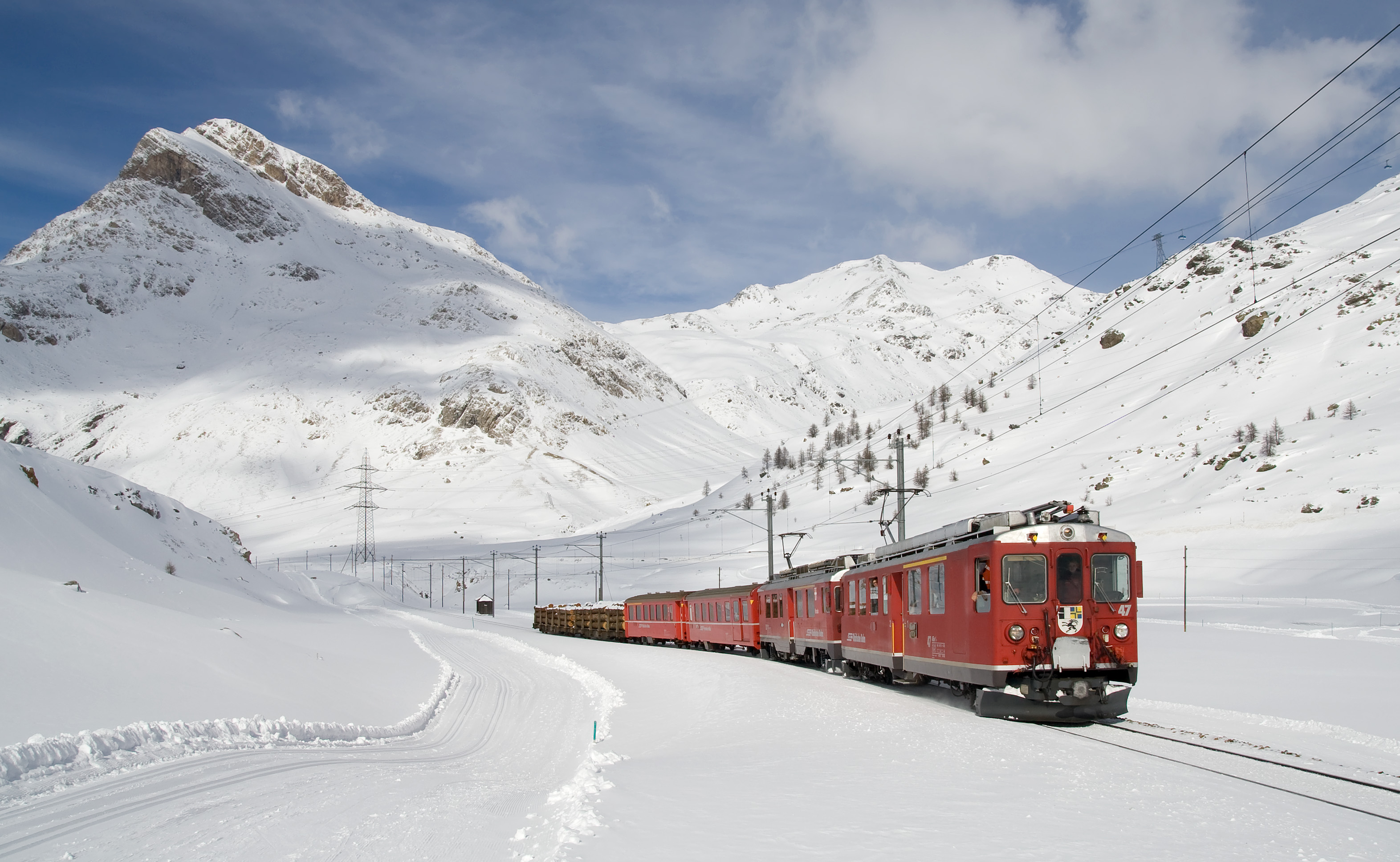
- Piz Minor (right summit) from the Bernina Railway

Highest point
- Elevation: 3,049 m (10,003 ft)
- Prominence: 584 m (1,916 ft)
- Parent peak: Piz Languard
- Listing: Alpine mountains above 3000 m
- Coordinates: 46°27′04″N 10°01′42″E

Geography
- Location within Switzerland
- Location: Graubünden, Switzerland
- Parent range: Livigno Alps

Piz Minor is a mountain of the Livigno Alps, located in Graubünden, Switzerland. Its 3,049 metre high summit overlooks the Livigno Pass on its eastern side.
