= Bernina Pass =

Mountain pass in Graubünden, Switzerland

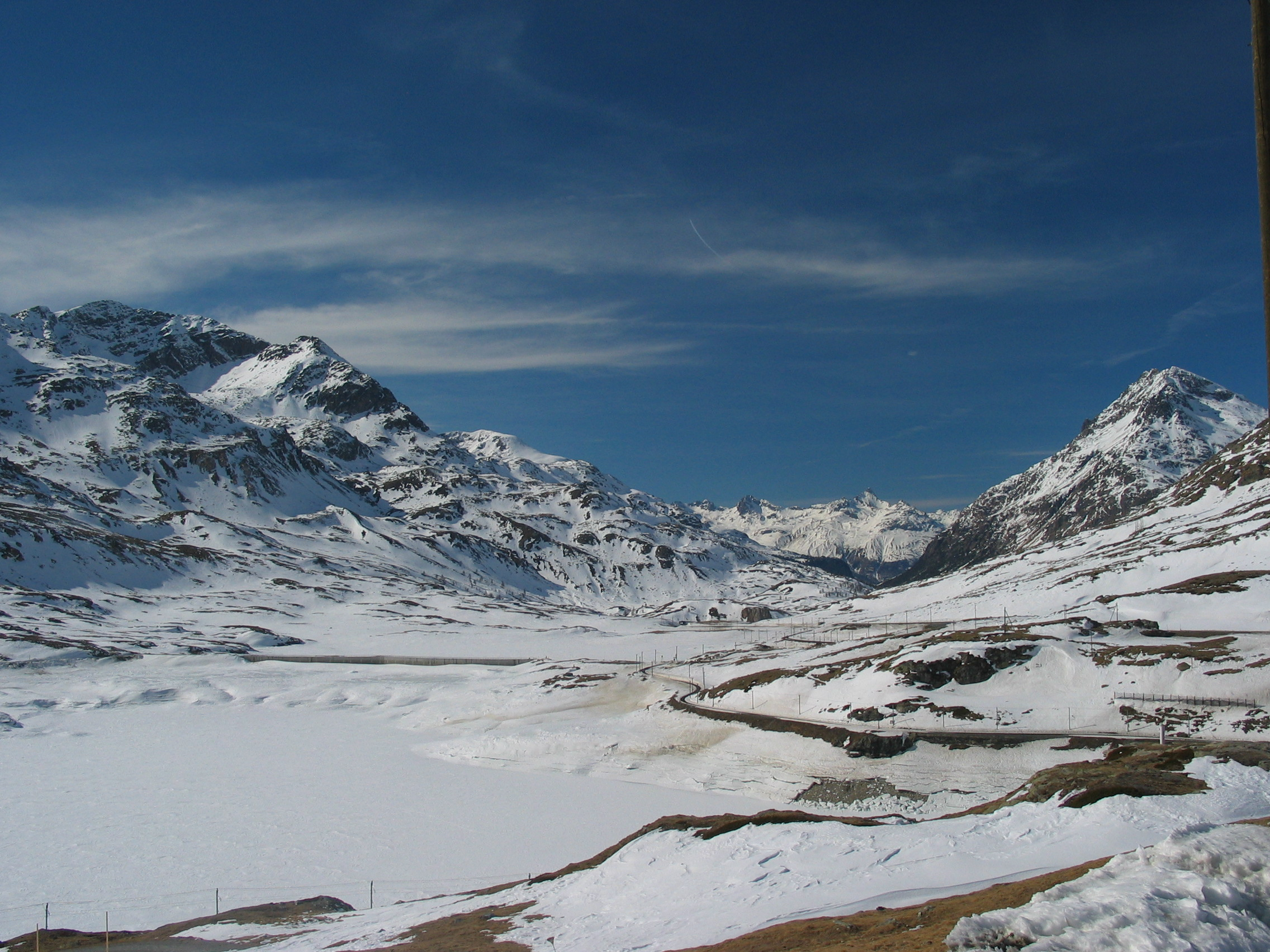
- View from the top of the pass in the direction of Pontresina, Switzerland

- Location within Switzerland
- Elevation: 2,328 metres (7,638 ft)
- Traversed by: Road, rail (2253 m.)

Third Approach
- Location: Graubünden, Switzerland
- Range: Alps
- Coordinates: 46°24′39″N 10°01′39″E

The Bernina Pass (el. 2,328 m or 7,638 ft.) (Italian: Passo del Bernina) is a high mountain pass in the Bernina Range of the Alps, in the canton of Graubünden (Grisons) in eastern Switzerland. It connects the famous resort town of St. Moritz in the Engadin valley with the Italian-speaking Val Poschiavo, which ends in the Italian town of Tirano in Valtellina. The pass lies a few kilometres east of Piz Bernina, and south of Val Minor.

The Bernina Pass is crossed by both the Hauptstrasse 29 road and the Bernina railway line, with a popular tourist train, the Bernina Express operating year-round between Chur and Tirano. The train crosses the pass west of the road at a slightly lower 2,253 metres (7,392 ft) (at Ospizio Bernina) – it is the highest adhesion railway route in Europe.

Lago Bianco, Lej Nair and Lej Pitschen are located on the pass.

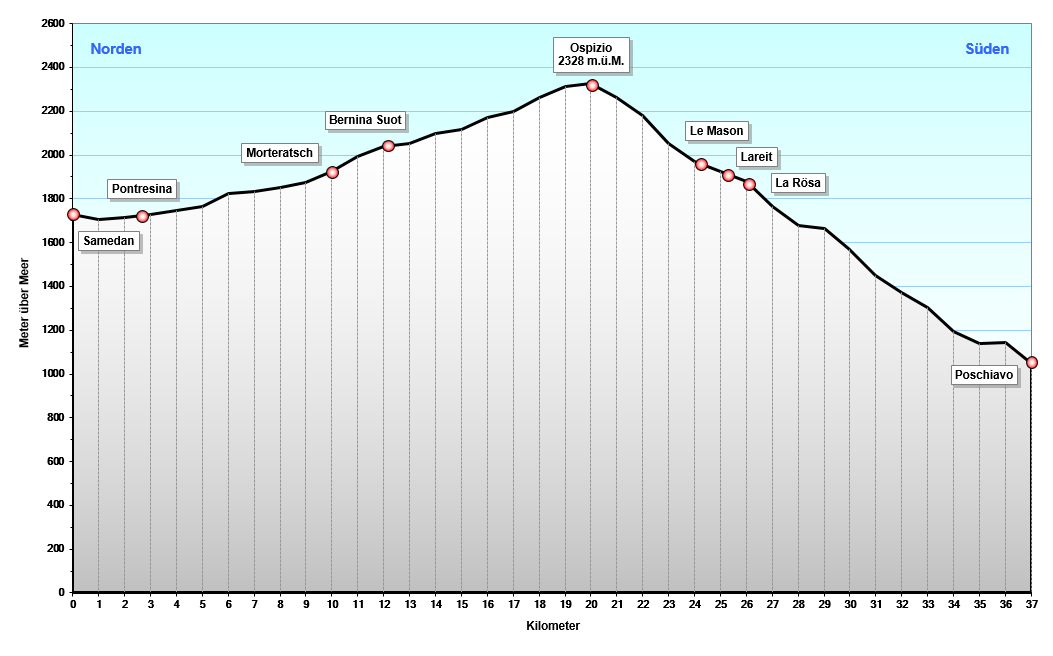
Profile of the Bernina pass road from Samedan to Poschiavo

== History ==
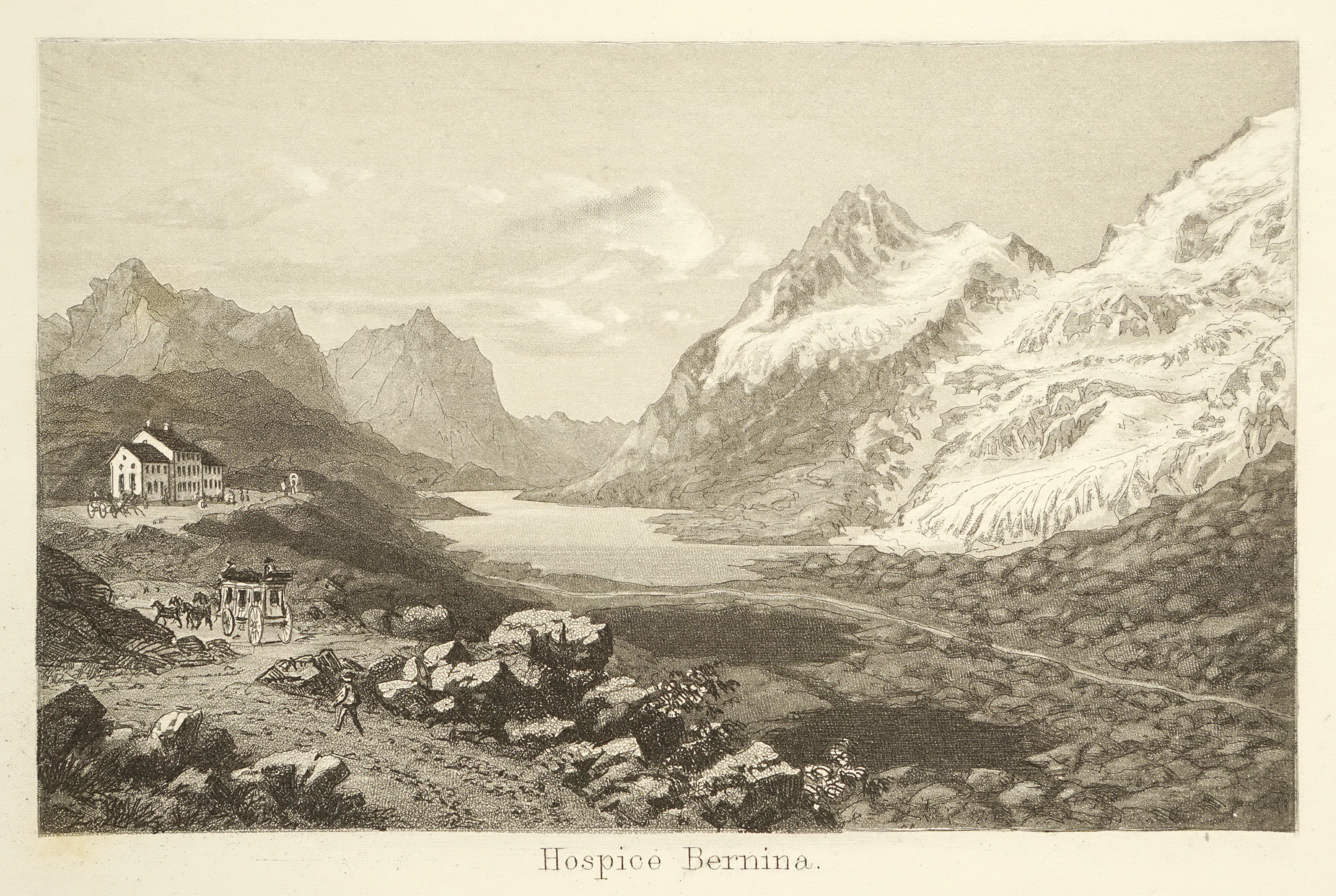
The Bernina hospice shortly after it opened in 1865, with Lago Bianco, Lej Nair, Lej Pitschen and Cambrena Glacier. Etching by Heinrich Müller

The pass was an important trade route over the Alps during the Middle Ages. In 1410 several communities north and south of the pass agreed to work together to maintain the path. In 1512 the Three Leagues and their Swiss allies invaded the Valtellina region through the Bernina Pass. Around this time the route over the pass was described for the first time. It covered a distance of about 20 miles (32 km) from Poschiavo to Pontresina.

The building of the road began in 1842. Head of engineers was Rudolf Albertini (1821–1896) from Zuoz. The work was finished in 1865 and a hospice at an elevation of 2,307 metres (7,569 ft) was also opened. Since this time the road has been widened several times. Since 1965 it has been open all year round, although there is snow during 8 months.

== Climate ==
Climate data for Passo del Bernina: 2260m (1991–2020)
Month	Jan	Feb	Mar	Apr	May	Jun	Jul	Aug	Sep	Oct	Nov	Dec	Year
Mean daily maximum °C (°F)	−3.5 (25.7)	−3.5 (25.7)	−0.8 (30.6)	2.2 (36.0)	7.3 (45.1)	11.9 (53.4)	14.4 (57.9)	13.7 (56.7)	9.5 (49.1)	5.6 (42.1)	0.3 (32.5)	−2.5 (27.5)	4.6 (40.2)
Daily mean °C (°F)	−6.4 (20.5)	−6.6 (20.1)	−4.2 (24.4)	−1.0 (30.2)	3.6 (38.5)	7.8 (46.0)	10.0 (50.0)	9.8 (49.6)	5.9 (42.6)	2.4 (36.3)	−2.3 (27.9)	−5.3 (22.5)	1.1 (34.1)
Mean daily minimum °C (°F)	−9.8 (14.4)	−10.0 (14.0)	−7.6 (18.3)	−4.2 (24.4)	0.3 (32.5)	4.2 (39.6)	6.5 (43.7)	6.3 (43.3)	3.1 (37.6)	−0.2 (31.6)	−4.9 (23.2)	−8.4 (16.9)	−2.1 (28.3)
Average precipitation mm (inches)	109 (4.3)	83 (3.3)	110 (4.3)	165 (6.5)	175 (6.9)	160 (6.3)	146 (5.7)	149 (5.9)	152 (6.0)	178 (7.0)	187 (7.4)	125 (4.9)	1,738 (68.4)
Average snowfall cm (inches)	107.4 (42.3)	86 (34)	105.4 (41.5)	146.1 (57.5)	49.1 (19.3)	9.6 (3.8)	2.1 (0.8)	2.1 (0.8)	9.7 (3.8)	46.3 (18.2)	114 (45)	113.9 (44.8)	791.7 (311.7)
Average precipitation days (≥ 1.0 mm)	7.6	6.9	7.9	10.6	13.1	11.5	11.4	12.0	9.3	10.5	9.5	8.5	118.8
Average snowy days (≥ 1.0 cm)	8	7.9	8.9	11	5.3	1.6	0.3	0.4	1.8	5.2	9.2	8.5	68.1
Average relative humidity (%)	63	65	67	72	72	69	67	70	71	70	68	66	68
Source: MeteoSwiss (1981-2010 precip/snowfall)

== Gallery ==
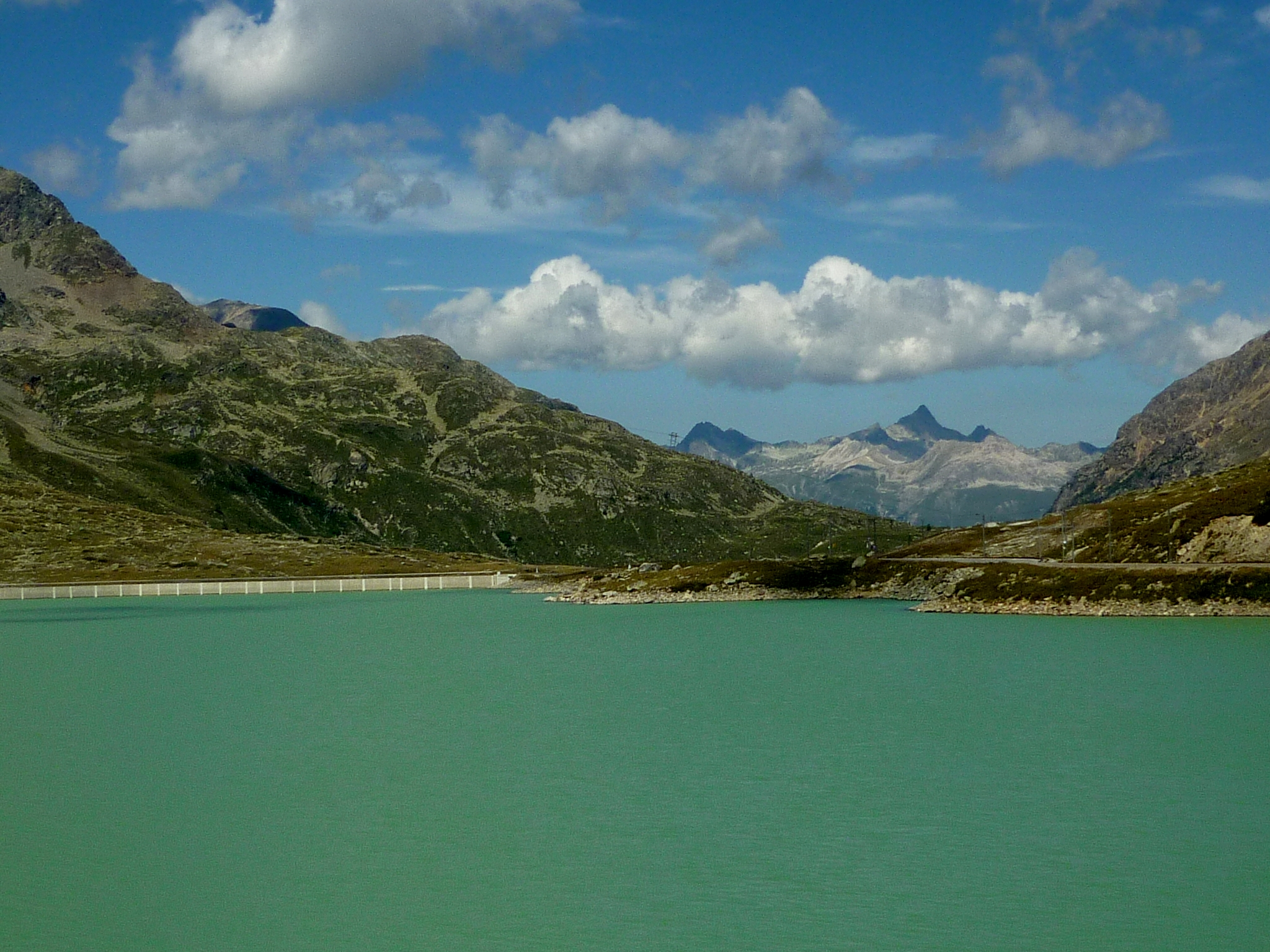
Bernina Pass and Lago Bianco

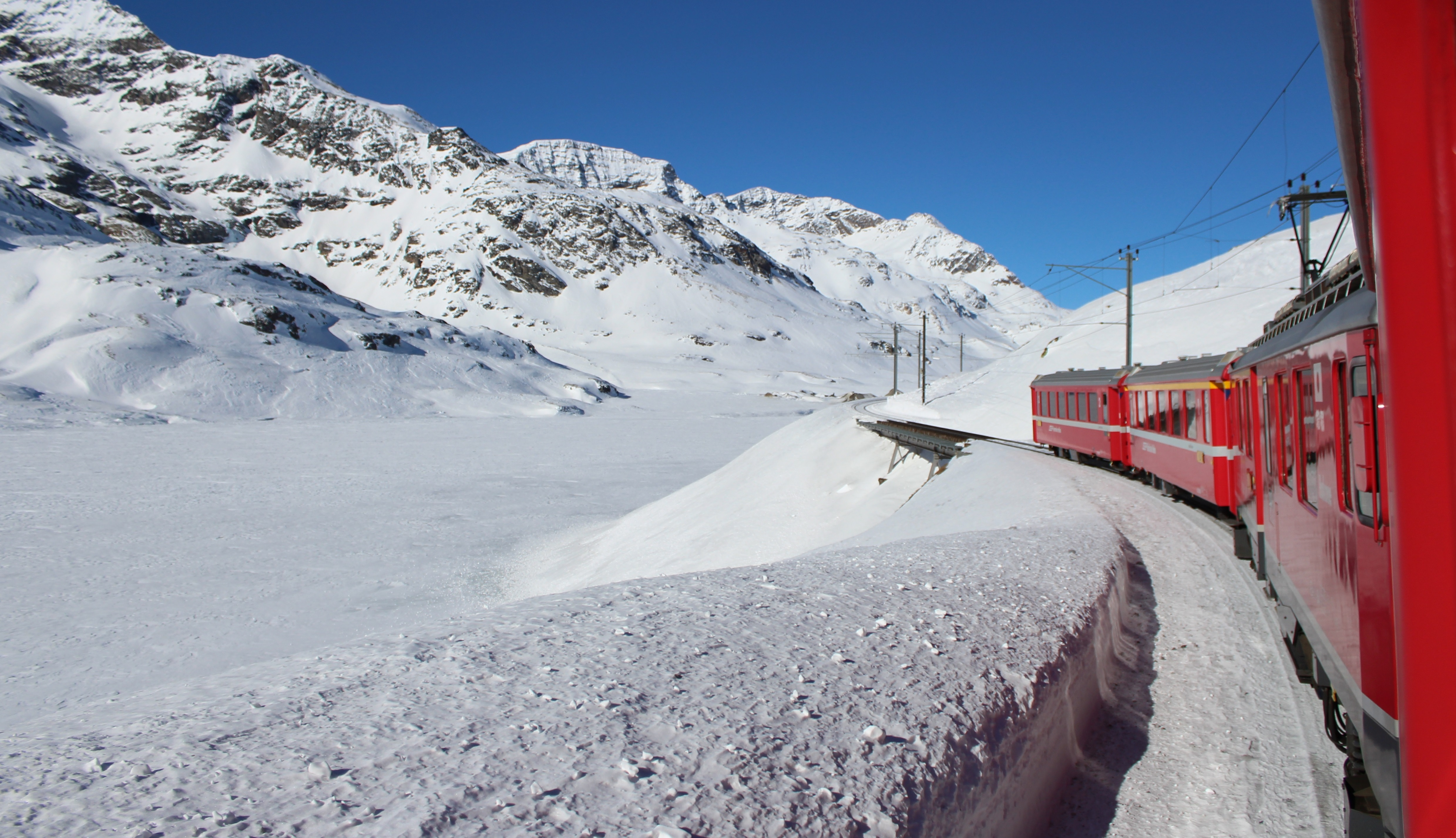
Bernina Pass by train in winter

== See also ==
- List of highest paved roads in Europe
- List of mountain passes
- List of the highest Swiss passes
