= Piz Cancian =

Mountain in Switzerland

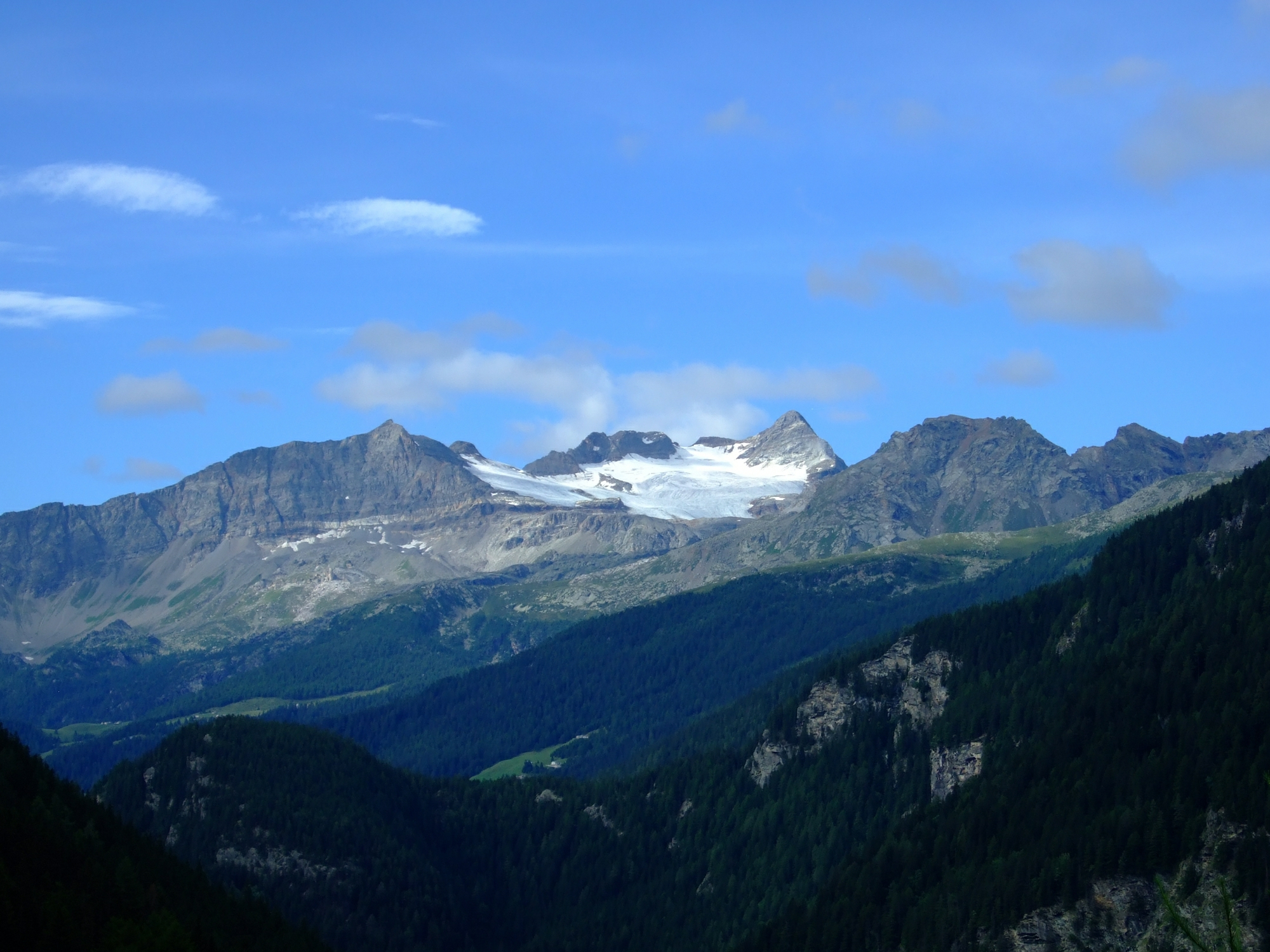
- Piz Cancian (left) and Punta Scalino (right)

Highest point
- Elevation: 3,103 m (10,180 ft)
- Prominence: 100 m (330 ft)
- Parent peak: Pizzo Scalino
- Coordinates: 46°17′00″N 9°59′59″E

Geography
- Location within Alps
- Location: Lombardy, Italy; Graubünden, Switzerland
- Parent range: Bernina Range

Piz Cancian is a mountain in the Bernina Range of the Alps, located on the border between Italy and the Switzerland. The summit has an elevation of 3,103 metres (10,180 ft) above sea level.

On its eastern Swiss side the mountain overlooks Lake Poschiavo and the Val di Poschiavo. On its western Italian side lie the 3,323-metre (10,902 ft) high Pizzo Scalino and the Vedretta di Pizzo Scalino glacier. The Swiss side of the mountain lies within the municipality of Poschiavo and the canton of Graubünden, whilst the Italian side is in the province of Sondrio and the region of Lombardy.
