= Le Prese =

- village
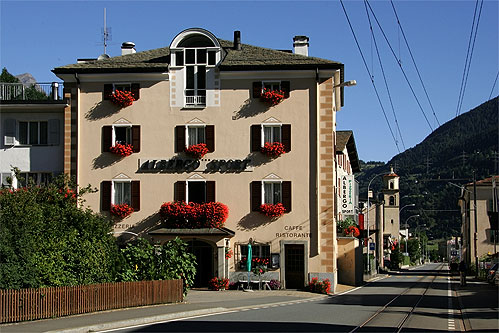

- Coordinates: 46°17′33″N 10°04′41″E
- Country: Switzerland

Le Prese is a village in the Val Poschiavo in the canton of Graubünden, Switzerland. It lies at 965 metres (3,166 ft) above sea level at the northern end of Lago di Poschiavo, and is in the municipality of Poschiavo, some 4 kilometres (2.5 mi) south of the village of the same name. The Poschiavino river enters the lake by the village.

Both the main road through the Val Poschiavo and the Bernina railway pass through the village, with the railway sharing the carriageway with road traffic in places, and running alongside the road in others. Le Prese railway station is situated in the centre of the village, on the shared carriageway section of the line.

In the middle of the 19th century, Le Prese was developed as a spa town, with the 1856 construction of the spa building and further improvements in 1861. It sold itself as the ideal acclimatization station between the north of Italy and the health resorts of the Engadin. The sulphur spa was well frequented until 1914. The spa (Albergo Bagni Le Prese/Kurhaus Le Prese) is on the Swiss Inventory of Cultural Property of National and Regional Significance. The parish church of San Francesco d'Assisi is in the centre of the village.
