= Sfazù =

- hamlet
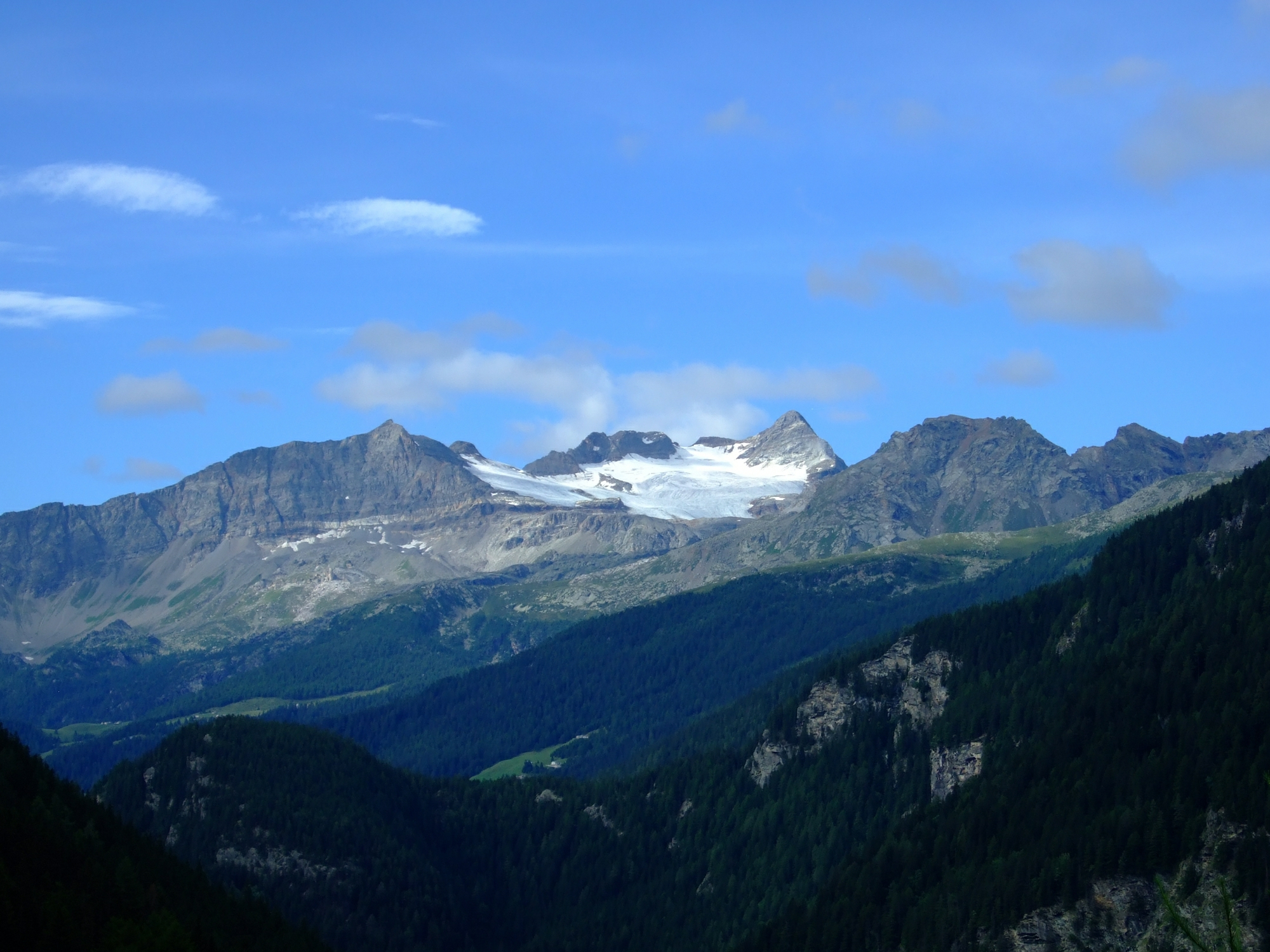

- Coordinates: 46°23′N 10°05′E
- Country: Switzerland

Sfazù is a hamlet in the upper part of the Val Poschiavo in the canton of Graubünden, Switzerland. It lies at 1,622 metres (5,322 ft) above sea level at the point where the Val da Camp enters the Val Poschiavo. It is on the southern approach to the Bernina Pass, and is in the municipality of Poschiavo, some 7.5 kilometres (4.7 mi) north of the village of the same name. Because of the 600 metres (2,000 ft) of altitude difference between the two villages, the distance between them by road is 9 kilometres (5.6 mi), using Hauptstrasse 29 that passes close by Sfazù.

Sfazù is a small hamlet with two houses, a restaurant and a hotel.
