= Lago di Poschiavo =

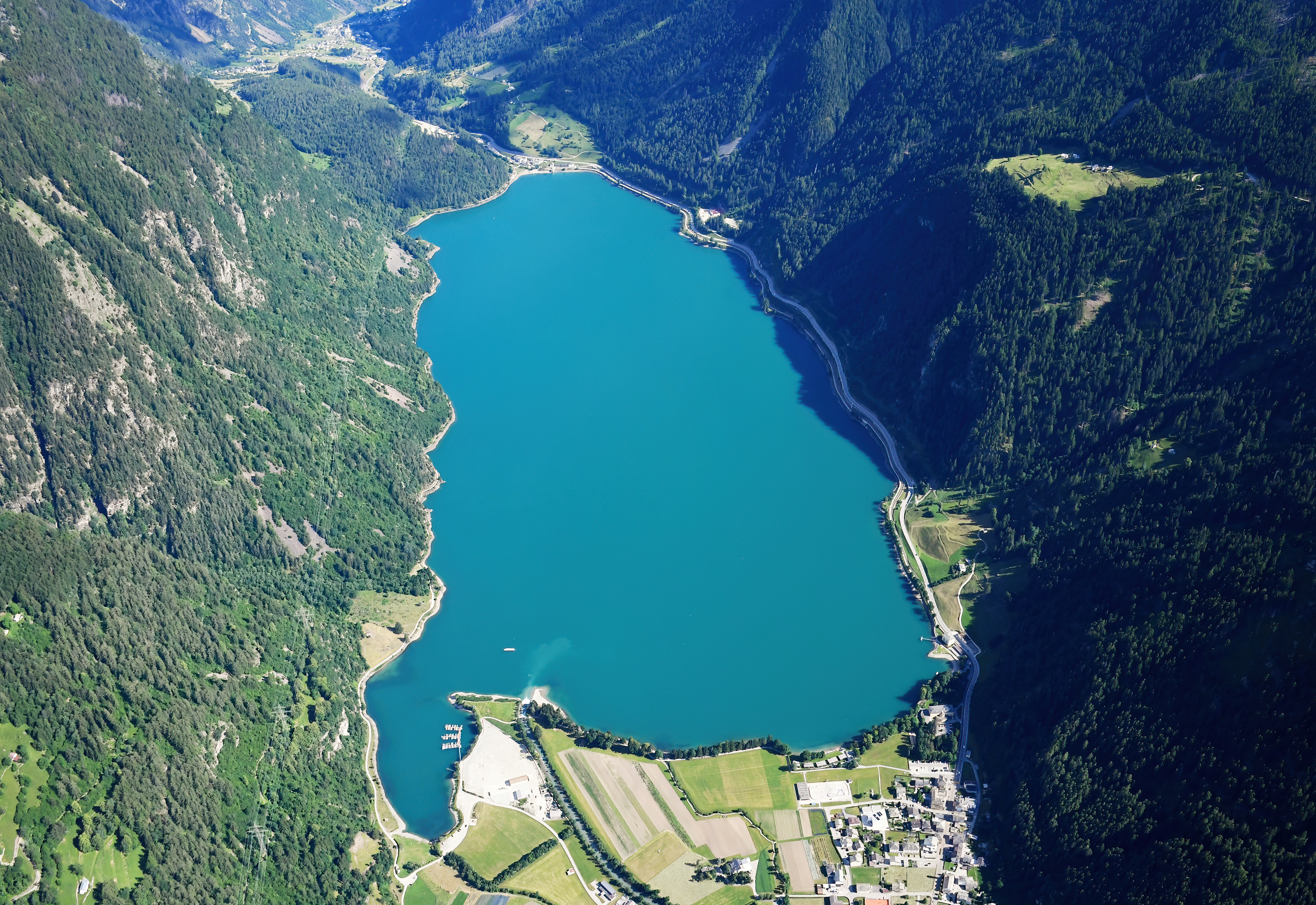
- Aerial view of Lago di Poschiavo from the north

- Location within Canton of Grisons Location within Switzerland Location within Italy Location within Alps
- Interactive map of Lago di Poschiavo
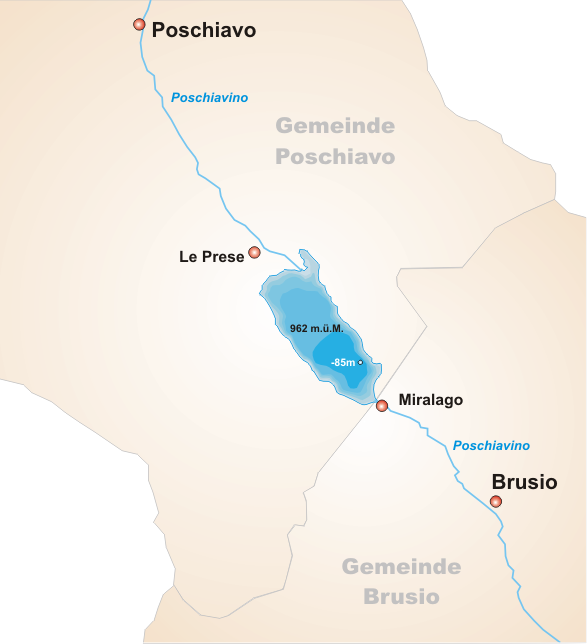
- Location: Grisons
- Coordinates: 46°16′56″N 10°5′25″E
- Type: natural lake
- Primary inflows: Poschiavino
- Primary outflows: Poschiavino
- Basin countries: Switzerland
- Max. length: 2.5 km (1.6 mi)
- Surface area: 1.98 km^{2} (0.76 sq mi)
- Max. depth: 85 m (279 ft)
- Water volume: 111.1 million cubic metres (90,100 acre⋅ft)
- Surface elevation: 962 m (3,156 ft)
- Settlements: Le Prese, Miralago, Cantone.

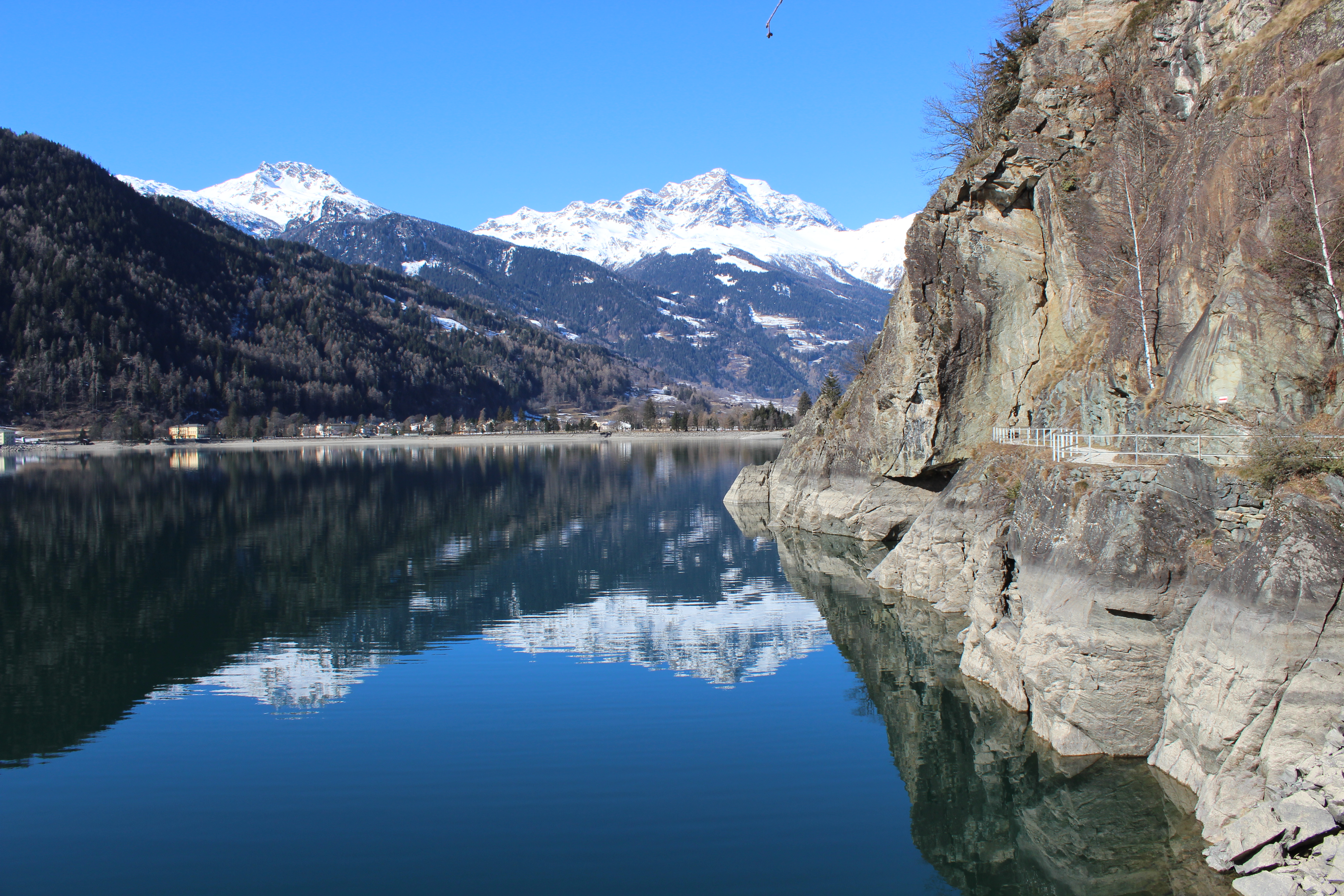
View from the eastern side looking north

Lago di Poschiavo is a natural lake in the Val di Poschiavo in the Swiss canton of the Grisons.

== Geography ==
It lies at an elevation of 962 m (3,156 ft), a length of 2.5 km (1.6 mi), a surface area of 1.98 km^{2} (0.76 sq mi) and a maximum depth of 85 m (279 ft). The lake is both fed and drained by the Poschiavino river and drains to the south, with its water eventually reaching the Mediterranean via the rivers Adda and Po.

The lake lies within the municipality of Poschiavo, and the villages of Le Prese and Miralago lie at its northern and southern ends respectively. The Bernina railway line runs alongside the western side of the lake, with stations at Le Prese and Miralago. The main valley road (Hauptstrasse 29) follows a higher route on the same side of the lake. A level hiking trail circumnavigates the lake, with some sections on the more precipitous eastern side in tunnel.

The lake was first referred to in 1010, when the newly founded monastery of San Abbondio in Como was granted fishing rights on the lake. By 1239 the fishing rights belonged to the House of Matsch.

Between 1904 and 1907 the lake was converted into a reservoir as part of a series of hydro-electric power plants in the Val di Poschiavo that are fed from the Lago Bianco. Water arriving at the lake in the Poschiavino river has already passed through several plants, and water leaving the lake passes along a tunnel high along the western side of the valley and then down a pipeline to feed the Campocologno power station at Campocologno. The conversion to a reservoir involved constructing a dam at the lake's outfall at Miralago that raised the maximum level of the lake by 1 m (3 ft 3 in). In operation the level of water can vary by up to 7 m (23 ft), giving a usable storage capacity of 15.1 million cubic metres (12,200 acre⋅ft). The total capacity of the lake when full is 111.1 million cubic metres (90,100 acre⋅ft).

There are current proposals to construct a pumped storage scheme based on Lago di Poschiavo and Lago Bianco, which is some 1,270 metres (4,170 ft) higher. This would involve creating a 18.1 kilometres (11.2 mi) long tunnel high along the western side of the Val di Poschiavo from Lago Bianco, followed by 2.4 kilometres (1.5 mi) long shaft to an underground power plant on the banks of the Lago di Poschiavo. This would have a total installed capacity of 1000 MW and would consume electricity to pump water to the higher level at times of low demand and release water to generate electricity in times of high demand. The proposals have received formal consent from the cantonal authorities, but as of 2016 are not believed to be financially viable.

== See also ==
- List of lakes of Switzerland
- List of mountain lakes of Switzerland
