= Federico Lardi =

Swiss ice hockey player

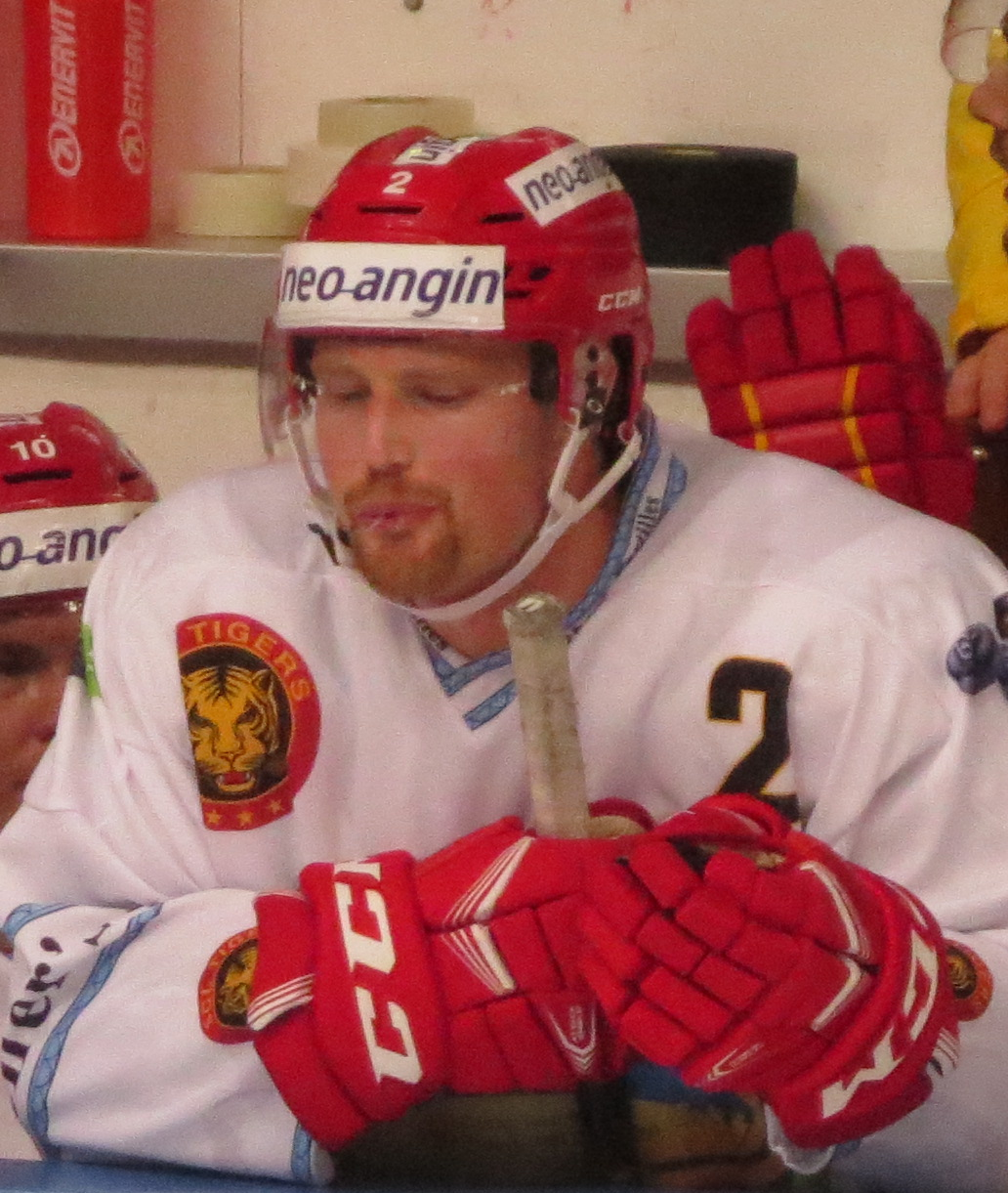
- Born: July 27, 1985 (age 40) Poschiavo, Switzerland
- Height: 6 ft 0 in (183 cm)
- Weight: 214 lb (97 kg; 15 st 4 lb)
- Position: Defence
- Shot: Left
- Played for: HC Davos; SCL Tigers; Lausanne HC
- Playing career: 2004–2021

Federico Lardi (born July 27, 1985) is a Swiss former professional ice hockey defenceman. He last played with the SCL Tigers of the Swiss National League (NL).

Lardi made his NLA debut playing with HC Davos during the 2003–04 season.

== Career statistics ==
			Regular season					Playoffs
Season	Team	League	GP	G	A	Pts	PIM	GP	G	A	Pts	PIM
2002–03	HC Davos U20	Elite Jr. A	33	1	3	4	6	5	0	1	1	0
2002–03	EHC Chur	SwissDiv1	4	0	0	0	—	—	—	—	—	—
2003–04	HC Davos U20	Elite Jr. A	32	1	1	2	26	—	—	—	—	—
2003–04	HC Davos	NLA	2	0	0	0	0	—	—	—	—	—
2004–05	HC Davos U20	Elite Jr. A	9	1	1	2	50	4	1	0	1	0
2004–05	EHC St. Moritz	SwissDiv1	22	4	4	8	—	—	—	—	—	—
2005–06	HC Martigny	NLB	22	2	1	3	20	—	—	—	—	—
2005–06	EHC Visp	NLB	19	1	7	8	12	6	0	0	0	0
2006–07	EHC Visp	NLB	45	8	10	18	20	16	1	4	5	20
2007–08	Lausanne HC	NLB	49	1	19	20	45	11	2	7	9	8
2008–09	Lausanne HC	NLB	44	2	11	13	6	16	2	3	5	8
2009–10	HC Sierre-Anniviers	NLB	46	9	22	31	37	11	1	1	2	2
2009–10	SCL Tigers	NLA	—	—	—	—	—	—	—	—	—	—
2010–11	SCL Tigers	NLA	41	1	5	6	4	4	0	0	0	0
2011–12	SCL Tigers	NLA	48	0	3	3	8	—	—	—	—	—
2012–13	SCL Tigers	NLA	47	1	7	8	8	—	—	—	—	—
2013–14	Lausanne HC	NLA	50	4	3	7	18	6	0	0	0	4
2014–15	Lausanne HC	NLA	37	0	4	4	12	6	0	1	1	0
2015–16	Lausanne HC	NLA	47	2	2	4	8	—	—	—	—	—
2016–17	Lausanne HC	NLA	36	0	2	2	10	4	0	0	0	2
2017–18	SCL Tigers	NLA	47	0	6	6	8	—	—	—	—	—
2018–19	SCL Tigers	NLA	49	2	7	9	16	7	1	2	3	6
2019–20	SCL Tigers	NLA	50	1	7	8	4	—	—	—	—	—
2020–21	SCL Tigers	NLA	48	0	7	7	16	—	—	—	—	—
NLA totals			502	11	53	64	112	55	2	7	9	24
NLB totals			225	23	70	93	140	60	6	15	21	38
