= Pizzo Scalino =

Mountain in Lombardy, Italy

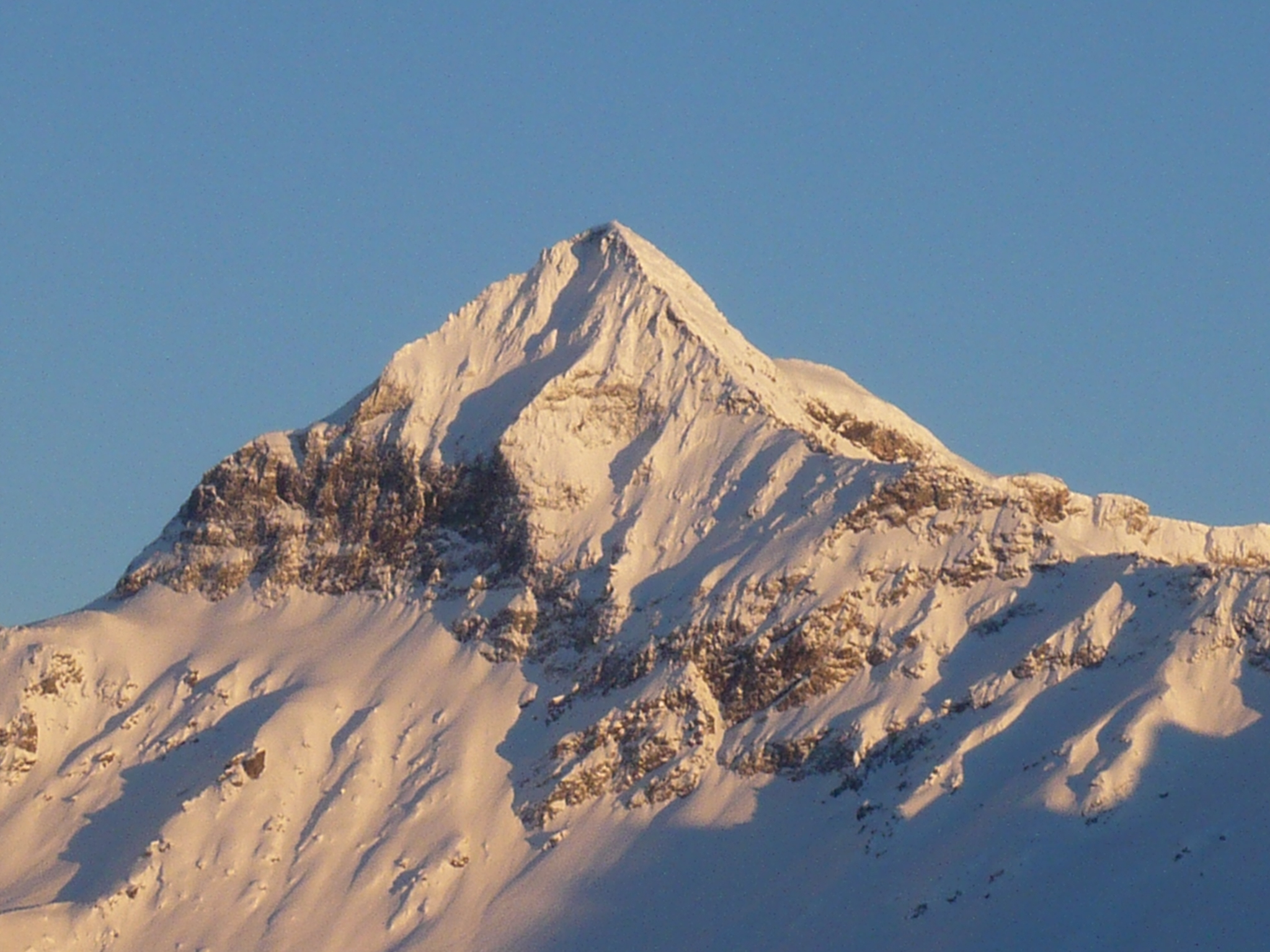
- Pizzo Scalino

Highest point
- Elevation: 3,323 m (10,902 ft)
- Prominence: 859 m (2,818 ft)
- Parent peak: Piz Bernina
- Listing: Alpine mountains above 3000 m
- Coordinates: 46°16′44″N 9°58′25″E

Geography
- Location within Alps
- Location: Lombardy, Italy
- Parent range: Bernina Range

Climbing
- First ascent: Summer 1830 by surveyors from Lombardy. First touristic ascent by F.F. Tuckett, F.A.Y. Brown, Chr. Almer and F. Andermatten on 22 June 1866

Pizzo Scalino is a mountain of the Bernina Range in Lombardy, Italy. It is known as the Valemalenco Matterhorn due to its pyramidal shape when viewed from the valley below. It lies close to Piz Cancian, where the border with Switzerland runs. The mountain is usually climbed from the Campo Moro Dam. From the summit, the whole of the Bernina Range is visible. It was first climbed in 1830.
