= Hauptstrasse 29 =

Road in Switzerland

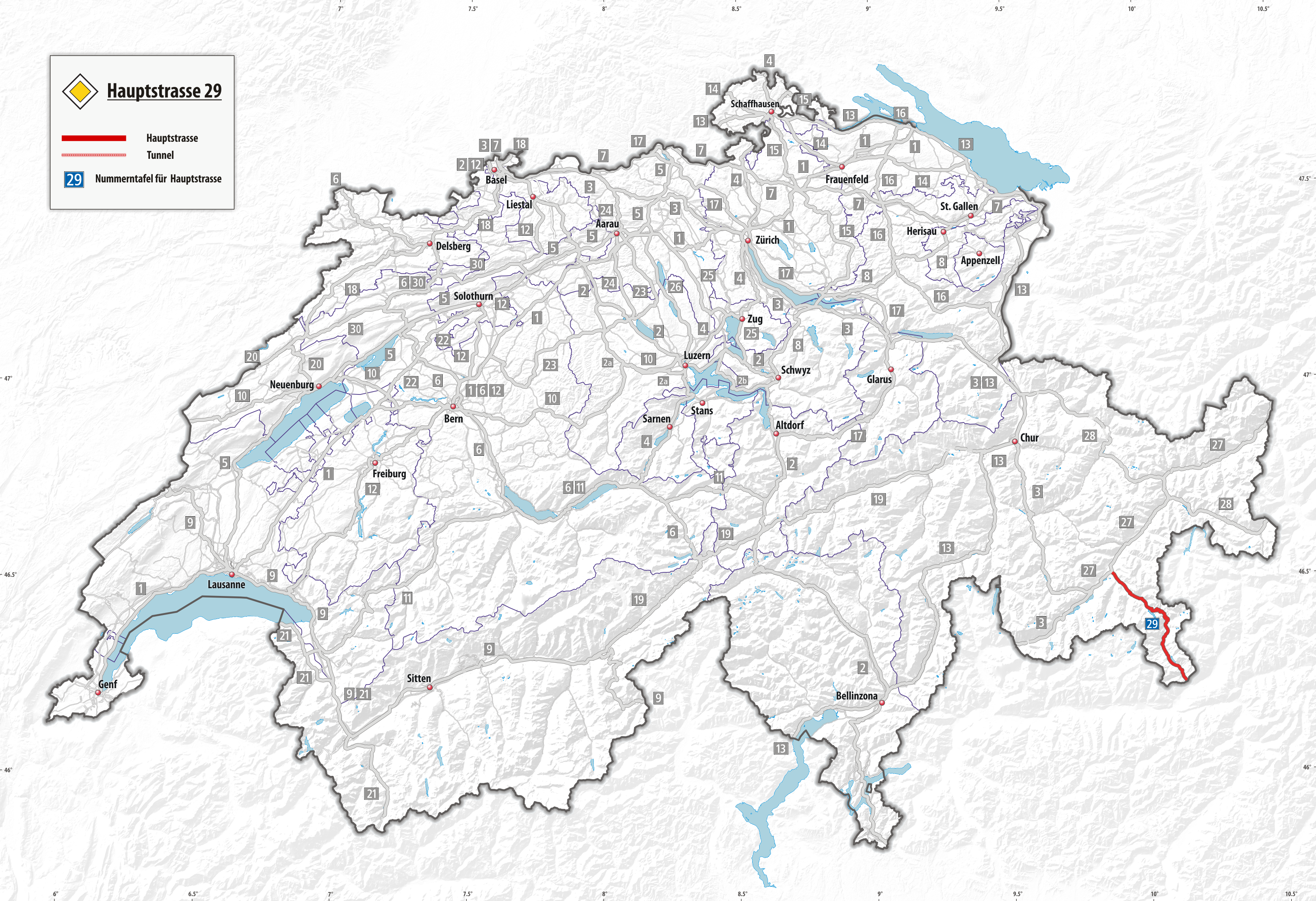
- Location of the H29 in Switzerland

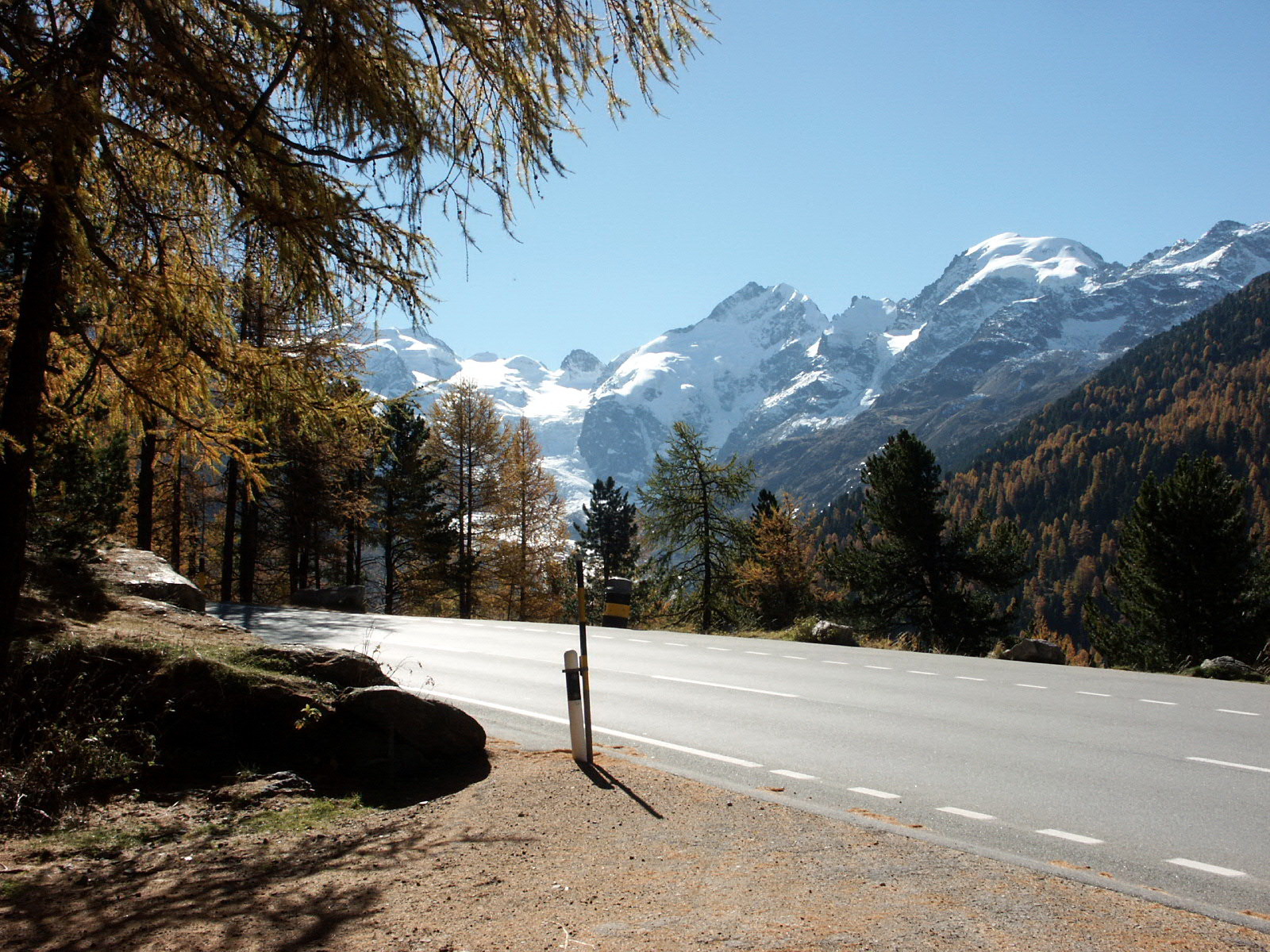
- The H29 near Pontresina

Route information
- Length: 51 km (32 mi)

Location
- Country: Switzerland

Highway system
- Transport in Switzerland; Motorways

The Hauptstrasse 29 is a main road in the Swiss canton of Graubünden, with a total length of 51 km (32 mi). The road begins at a junction with Hauptstrasse 27 between Samedan and Pontresina, and passes Pontresina before climbing over the Bernina pass at a maximum elevation of 2,328 m (7,638 ft) above sea level. From the summit of the pass the road descends into the Val di Poschiavo and passes through San Carlo, Poschiavo, Le Prese and Brusio before reaching the border with Italy at Campocologno.

For much of its route north of the pass, and again south of Poschiavo, the road is closely paralleled by the Bernina railway line. Indeed at a few locations south of Poschiavo, the railway line runs within the carriageway of the road, with road vehicles having to give way to trains.

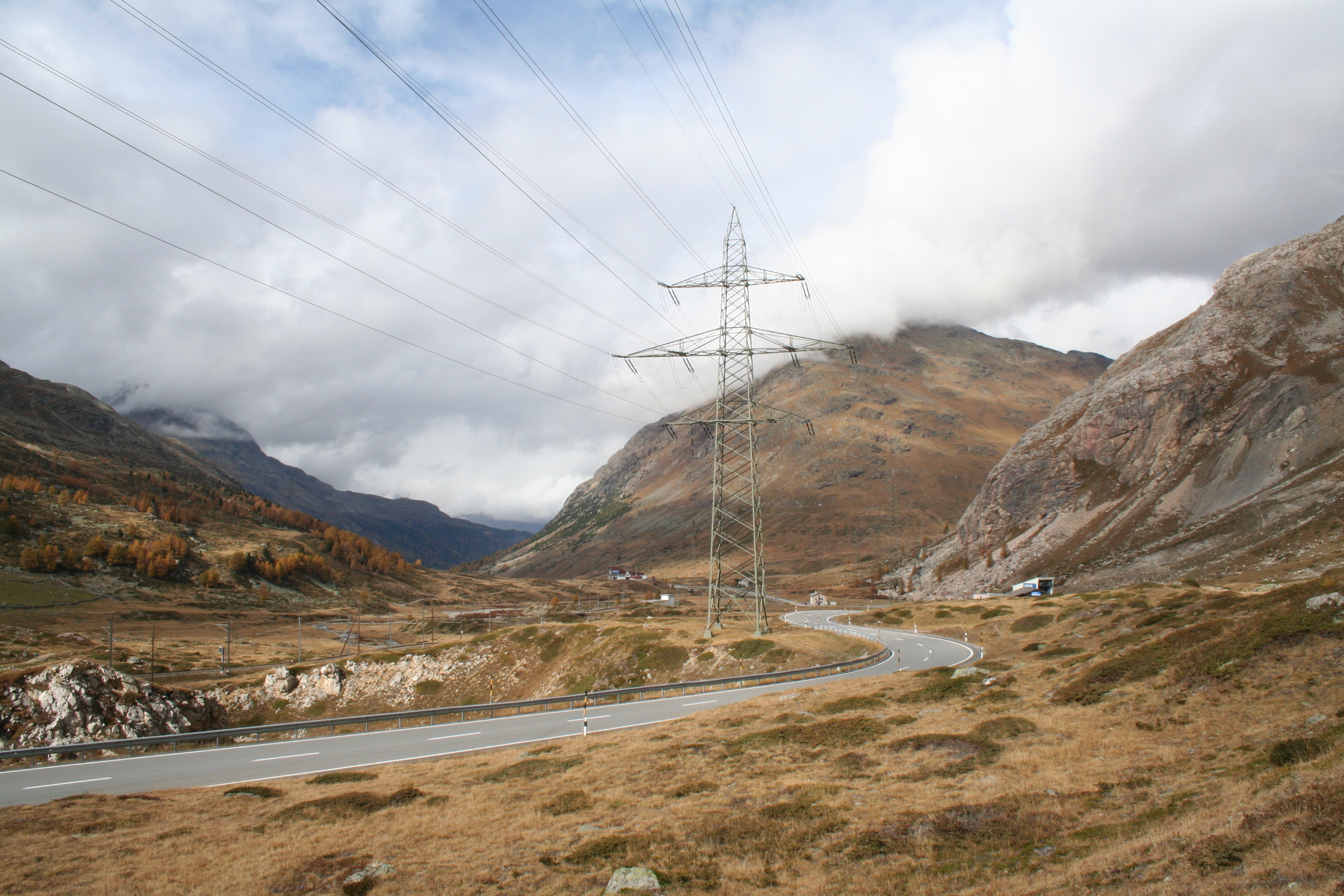
H29 on the north side of the Bernina pass.

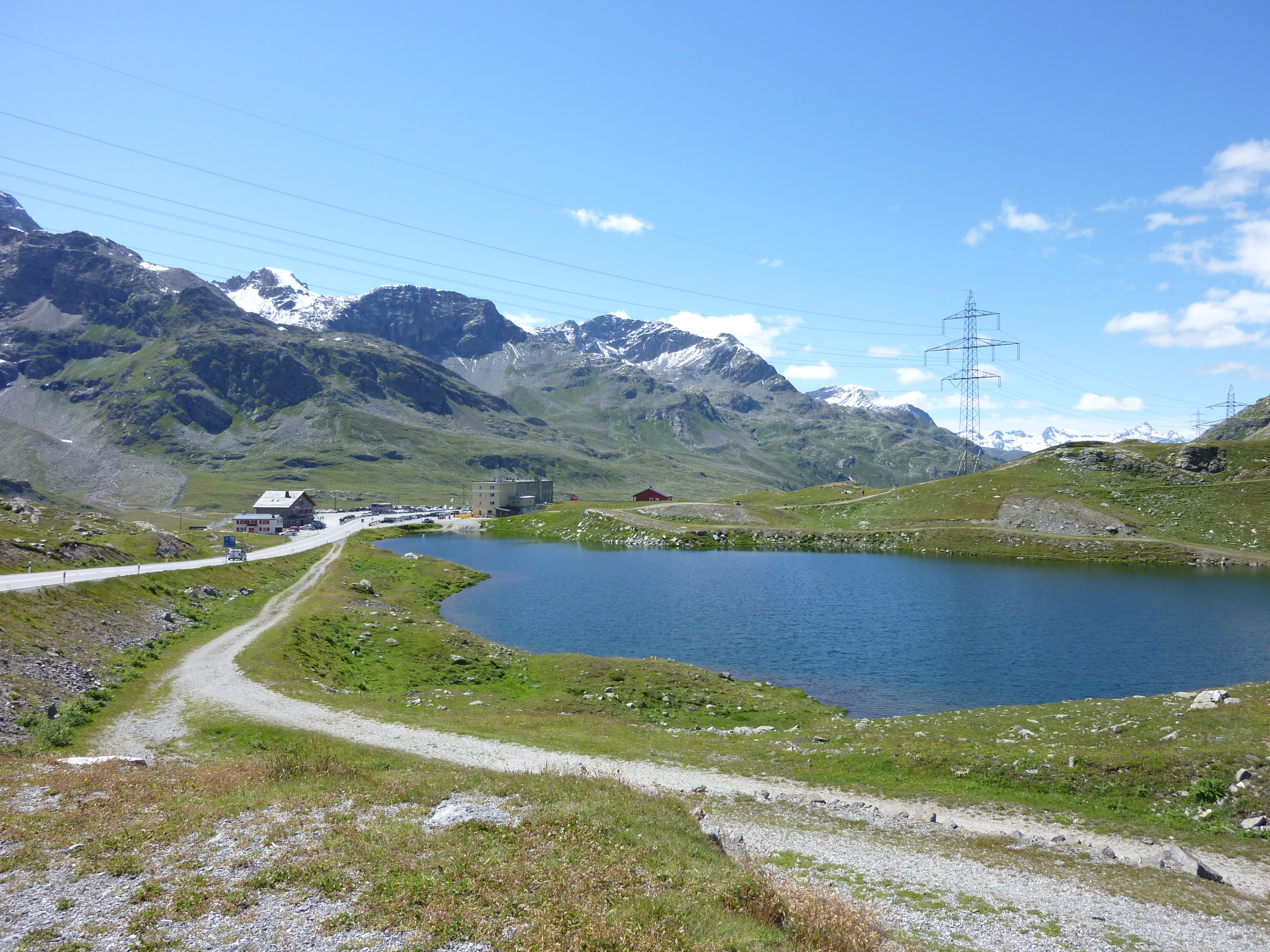
Near the summit of the H29 (left).

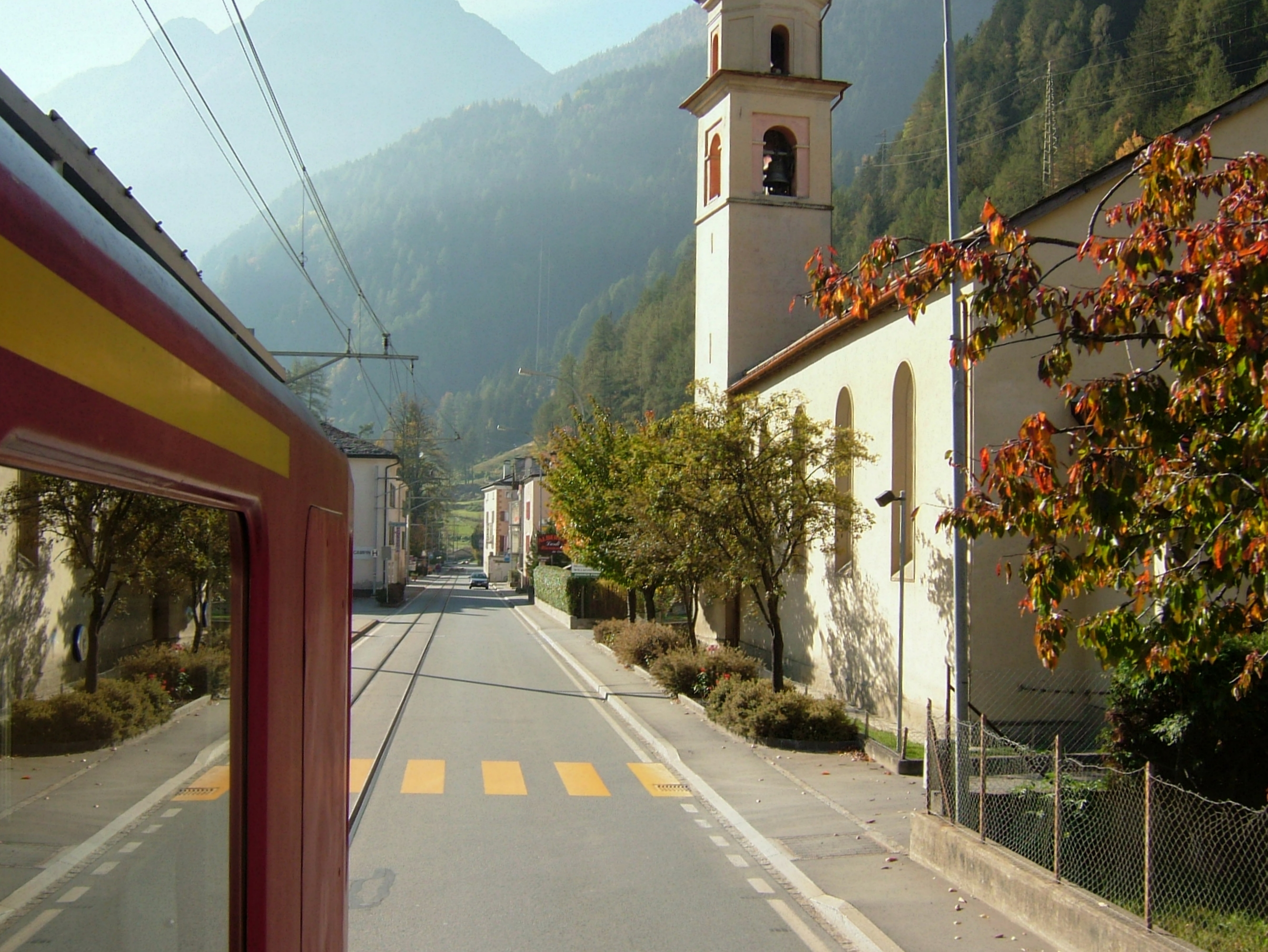
H29 sharing the road with trains in Le Prese.
