= Poschiavo =

- Municipality
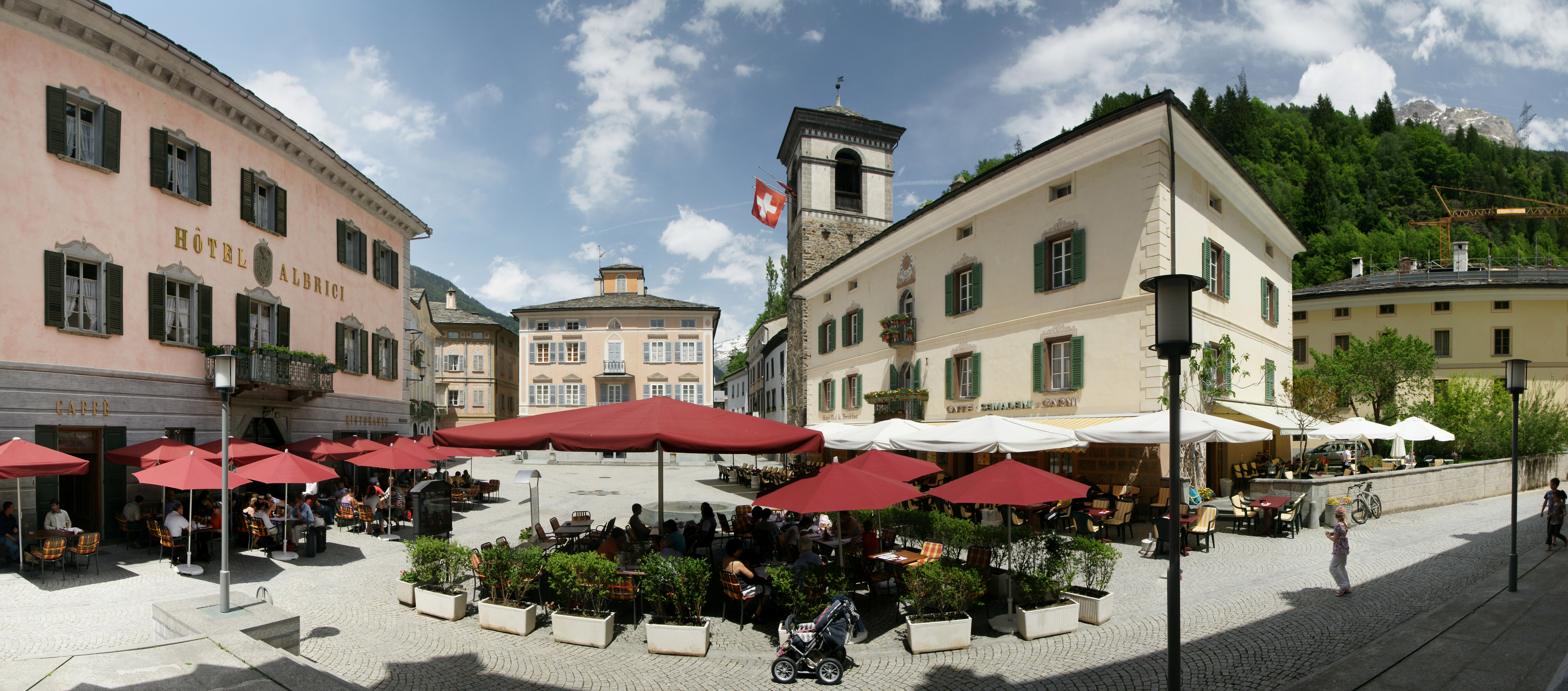

- Flag Coat of arms
- Location of Poschiavo
- Location within Switzerland Location within Canton of Grisons
- Coordinates: 46°19′N 10°3′E
- Country: Switzerland
- Canton: Grisons
- District: Bernina

Government
  - Mayor: podestà Alessandro Della Vedova 2011-2018

Area
  - Total: 192 km^{2} (74 sq mi)
- Elevation: 1,014 m (3,327 ft)

Population (December 2015)
  - Total: 3,513
  - Density: 18.3/km^{2} (47.4/sq mi)
- Time zone: UTC+01:00 (CET)
  - Summer (DST): UTC+02:00 (CEST)
- Postal code: 7742
- SFOS number: 3561
- ISO 3166 code: CH-GR
- Localities: Angeli Custodi, Annunziata, Cantone, Cavaglia, Cologna, Miralago, Le Prese, Li Curt, Motta, Pagnoncini, Pedecosta, Piazzo, Prada, Privilasco, Sant'Antonio, San Carlo, Sfazù
- Surrounded by: Brusio, Chiuro (IT-SO), Grosio (IT-SO), Grosotto (IT-SO), Lanzada (IT-SO), Livigno (IT-SO), Pontresina, Valdidentro (IT-SO)
- Website: www.poschiavo.ch

Poschiavo (Italian: Poschiavo, Lombard: Pusciaaf, German: Puschlav, Romansh: Puschlav) is a municipality in the Bernina Region in the canton of Grisons in Switzerland.

== History ==
Poschiavo is first mentioned in 824 as in Postclave though this comes from a later copy of the original document. In 1140 it was mentioned as de Pusclauio. It was formerly known by the German name of Puschlav. It owes its beauty to the imposing Renaissance style of its courtly 19th century architecture. These palazzi were built by prosperous local residents who had made their fortune abroad, particularly in Spain.

== Geography ==
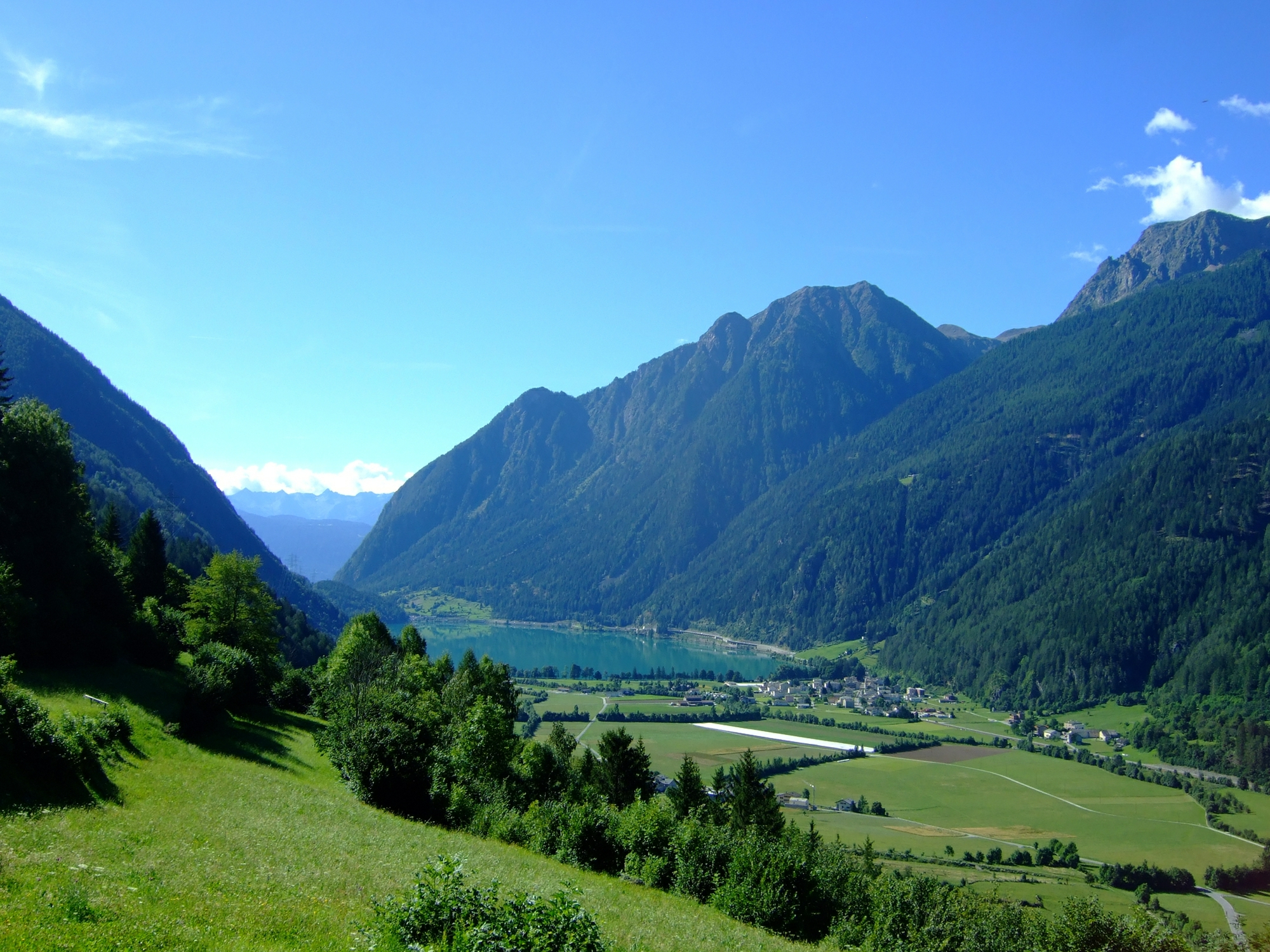
Lago di Poschiavo

Aerial view from 200 m by Walter Mittelholzer (1925)

Poschiavo has an area, as of 2006, of 191 km^{2} (74 sq mi). Of this area, 19.8% is used for agricultural purposes, while 32.1% is forested. Of the rest of the land, 1.8% is settled (buildings or roads) and the remainder (46.2%) is non-productive (rivers, glaciers or mountains).

Until 2017, the municipality was located in the Poschiavo sub-district of the Bernina district, after 2017 it was part of the new Bernina Region. It is located in the Val Poschiavo, one of the four valleys of the Italian Grisons, where the official language is Italian. The other valleys are Val Bregaglia, Mesolcina and Calanca. It consists of the village of Poschiavo and numerous hamlets.

Poschiavo has its own lake, called Lago di Poschiavo, which is located to the south of the village.

== Transportation ==
Poschiavo's only direct connection to Engadin and the rest of Switzerland is over the Bernina Pass. The town is connected by the Hauptstrasse 29 road over the pass and a Rhätische Bahn (RhB) station on the Bernina Railway between St. Moritz and Tirano. There are a total of seven other railway stations along the Bernina line in the municipality: Ospizio Bernina, Alp Grüm, Cavaglia, Cadera, Li Curt, Le Prese, and Miralago.

== Demographics ==
Poschiavo has a population (as of 31 December 2020) of 3,441; as of 2008, 8.2% of the population was made up of foreign nationals and, over the last 10 years the population has decreased at a rate of −3.6%.

In 2000 the gender distribution of the population was 49.1% male and 50.9% female; while the age distribution, as of 2000 is: 332 people or 10.3% of the population are between 0 and 9 years old; 222 people or 6.9% are 10 to 14 and 122 people or 3.8% are from 15 to 19. Of the adult population, 300 people or 9.3% are between 20 and 29 years; 433 people or 13.4% are 30 to 39; 413 people or 12.8% are 40 to 49 and 422 people or 13.1% are 50 to 59. The senior population distribution is 389 people or 12.1% between 60 and 69 years old; 362 people or 11.2% are 70 to 79; there are 197 people or 6.1% who are from 80 to 89 and 33 people or 1.0% who are from 90 to 99.

In the 2007 federal election the most popular party was the CVP which received 32.2% of the vote; the next three most popular parties were the SVP (27%), the SPS (26.8%) and the FDP (12.6%).

In the town about 69.3% of the population (between age 25–64) have completed either the non-mandatory upper secondary education or additional higher education (either university or a Fachhochschule). It has an unemployment rate of 1.21%, since 2005 there are 252 people employed in the primary economic sector with about 90 businesses involved in it; 456 people are employed in the secondary sector in which there are 60 businesses; 1,073 people are employed in the tertiary sector, with 164 businesses.

From the 2000 census, 2,774 or 86.0% are Roman Catholic, while 283 or 8.8% belong to the Swiss Reformed Church; of the rest of the population, there are nine individuals (or about 0.28% ) who belong to the Christian Catholic faith, and fourteen, or about 0.43%, who belong to another Christian church. There are two persons, or approximately 0.06% of the population, who belong to another church not listed on the census; 36, i.e. 1.12% of the population belong to no church, because they are either agnostic or atheist, whilst 107 of the total ( 3.32% of the population ) did not answer the question.

The historical status of the population is given in the following table:

Year	Inhabitants
1850	2888
1860	2742
1870	2890
1900	3102
1910	3676
1950	4034
1980	3294
2000	3225
2005	3487

== Languages ==
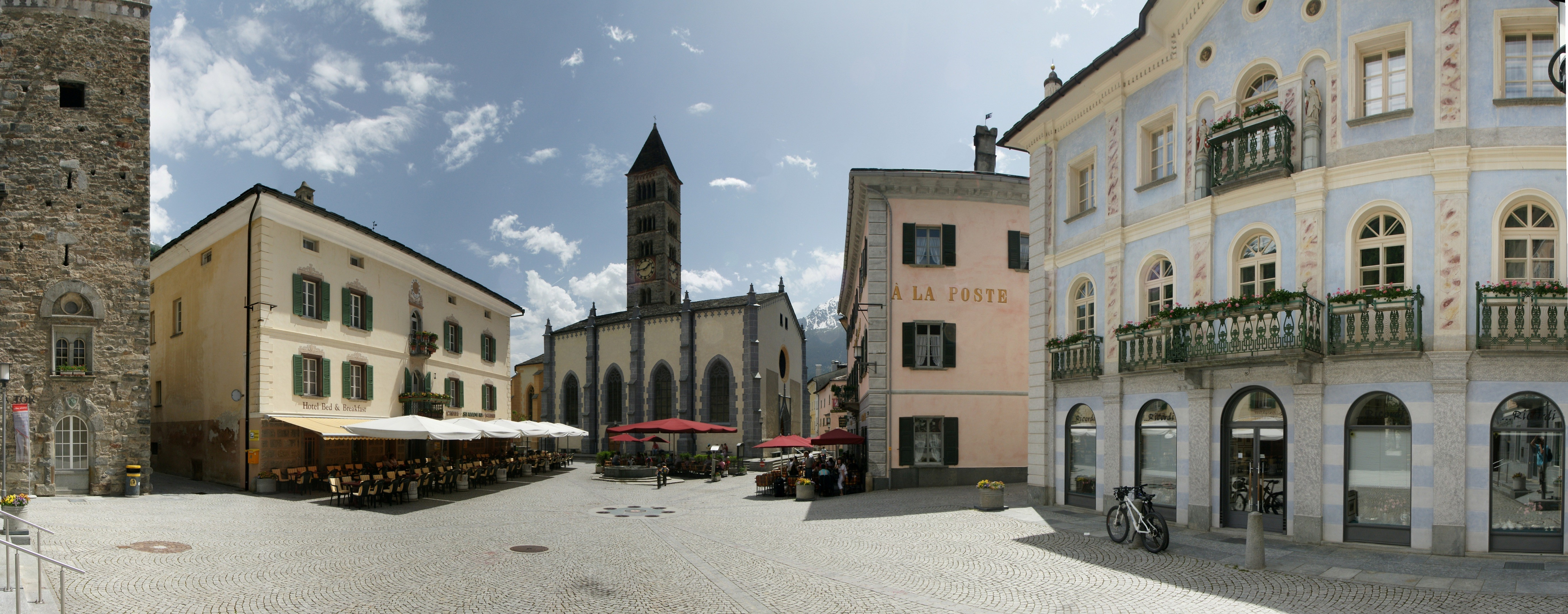
Piazza Comunale

Most of the population (as of 2000) speaks Italian as native language (90.4%), with German being second most common (7.9%) and French being third (0.7%). In addition to Italian, Lombard is the native language of the majority of people, spoken in a condition of diglossia with Standard Italian. Lombard is still widely used in official contexts, such as the city council.

Languages in Poschiavo
Languages	Census 1980		Census 1990		Census 2000	
Languages	Number	Percent	Number	Percent	Number	Percent
German	208	6.31%	255	8.02%	255	7.91%
Romansh	24	0.73%	22	0.69%	14	0.43%
Italian	3028	91.92%	2858	89.93%	2917	90.45%
Population	3294	100%	3178	100%	3225	100%

== Notable residents ==
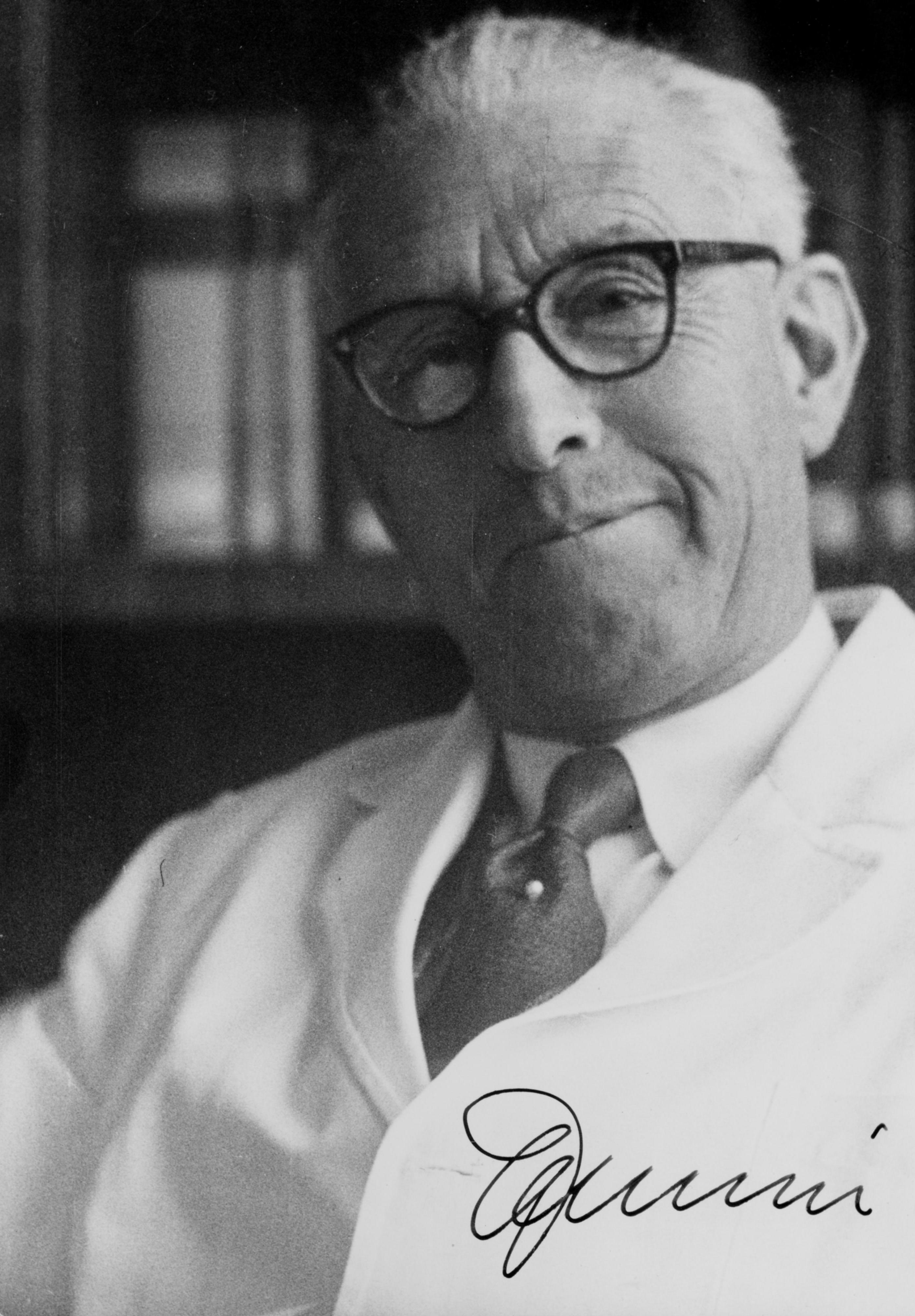
Guido Fanconi, 1959

- Guido Fanconi (1892 in Poschiavo – 1979), a Swiss pediatrician
- Wolfgang Hildesheimer (1916–1991), German writer, lived in Poschiavo from 1957 to 1991
- Werner Lüdi (1936 in Poschiavo – 2000), a Swiss jazz saxophonist and author
- David Gervasi (born 1983 in Poschiavo), a decathlete
- Federico Lardi (born 1985 in Poschiavo), a Swiss ice hockey defenceman
- Evelina Raselli (born 1992 in Poschiavo), a Swiss ice hockey forward, bronze medallist at the 2014 Winter Olympics

== Heritage sites of national significance ==
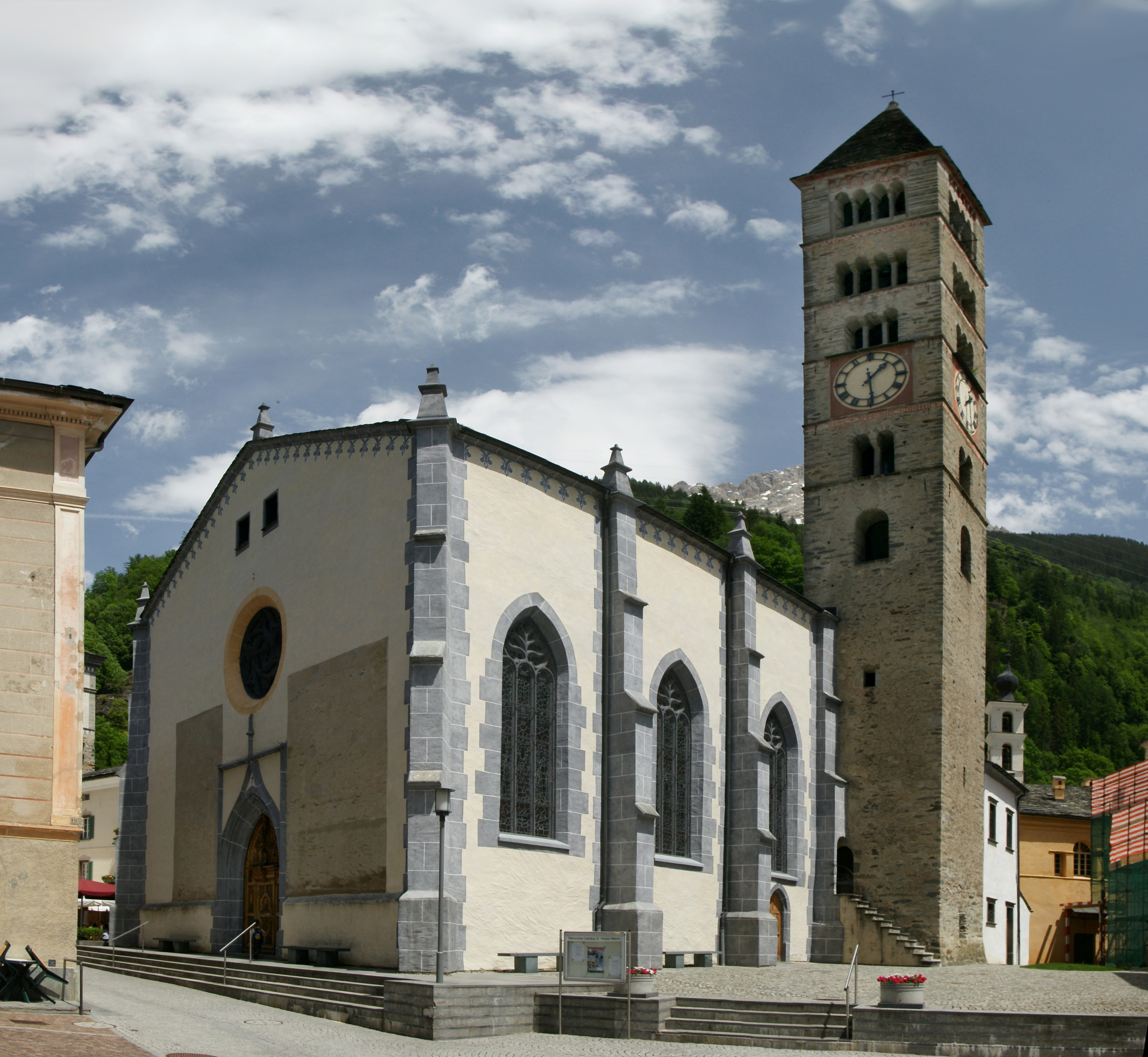
Church of San Vittore in Poschiavo

There are ten buildings in Poschiavo that are listed as Swiss Heritage sites of national significance. Three churches and a chapel are listed: S. Maria Assunta, S. Vittore, S. Carlo Borromeo and Vecchio Monastero con cappella monastica di S. Maria Presentata; three houses are also on the lis: Casa Tomé, Devon House, and Li Curt House; finally, there are three buildings, now used as museums; Mulino di Aino, Palazzo De Bassus Mengotti, Palazzo Dorizzi.

Casa Tomé is now the Poschiavo town museum, an excellent example of the traditional architecture of the Val Poschiavo; during the Middle Ages it was built as a tower house; by 1450 it had reached its current exterior appearance. While it was built in the village center, it had a structure that more closely matched nearby farm house; today it houses a museum and hosts classes and discussions on traditional farming and food production techniques.

The Mulino di Aino presents several pre-industrial trades; this working museum shows how flour was produced from grain, boards from timber and horseshoes from iron. The baroque Palazzo De Bassus-Mengotti was built in 1655 and expanded over the following centuries and today it also houses a museum whose ground floor houses a collection of farm implements. The first floor is used for temporary exhibits and currently (in 2009) it holds a collection of paintings by the local artist Fernando Lardelli; the second floor contains exhibits showing everyday life in the valley and emigration from the same. The Palazzo Dorizzi houses pieces collected by Christen and Dorizzi (from Basel and Puschlav respectively) in India during 1947–57.

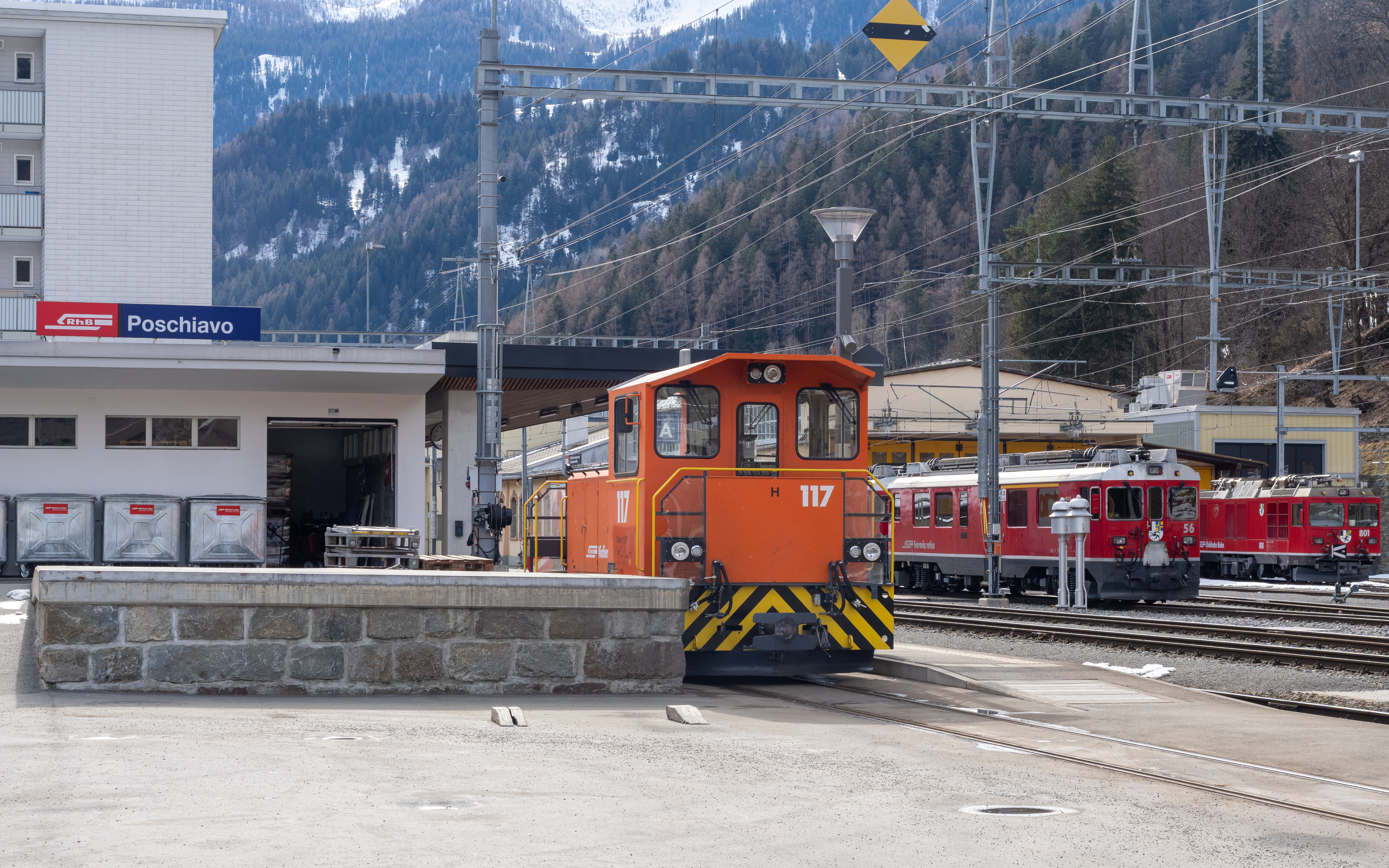
Poschiavo station

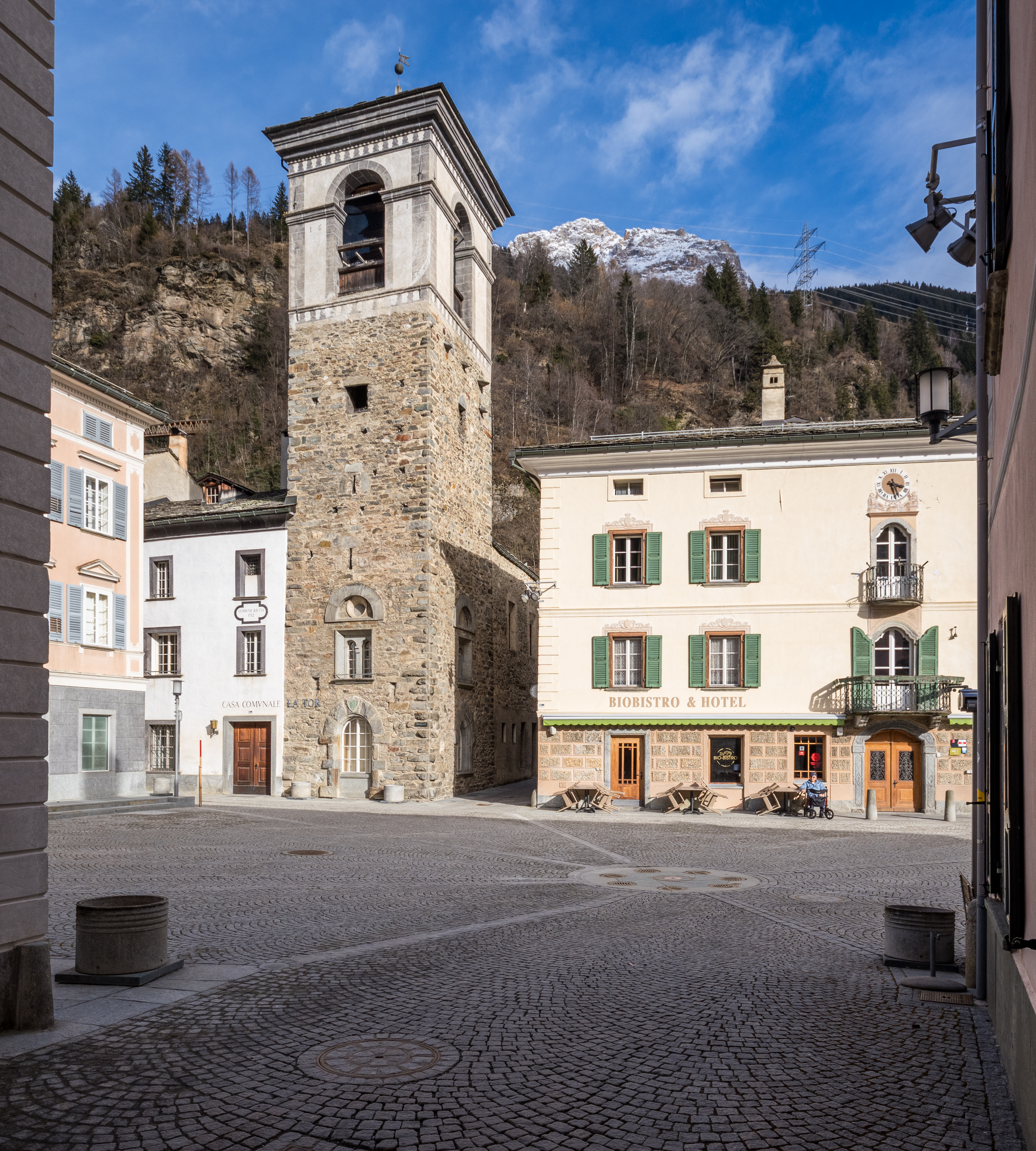
Piazza Comunale

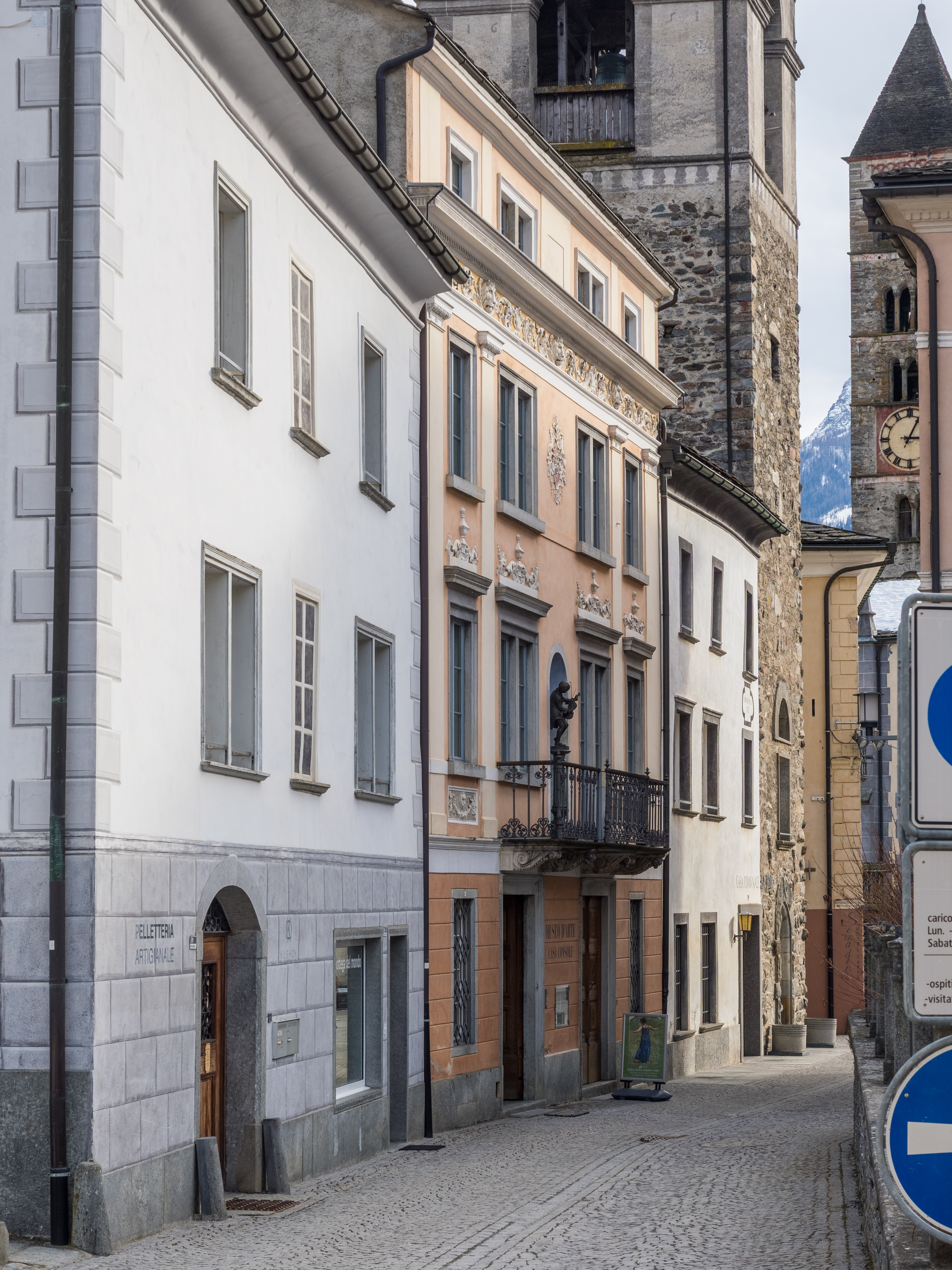
Via da Mezz with Art Museum

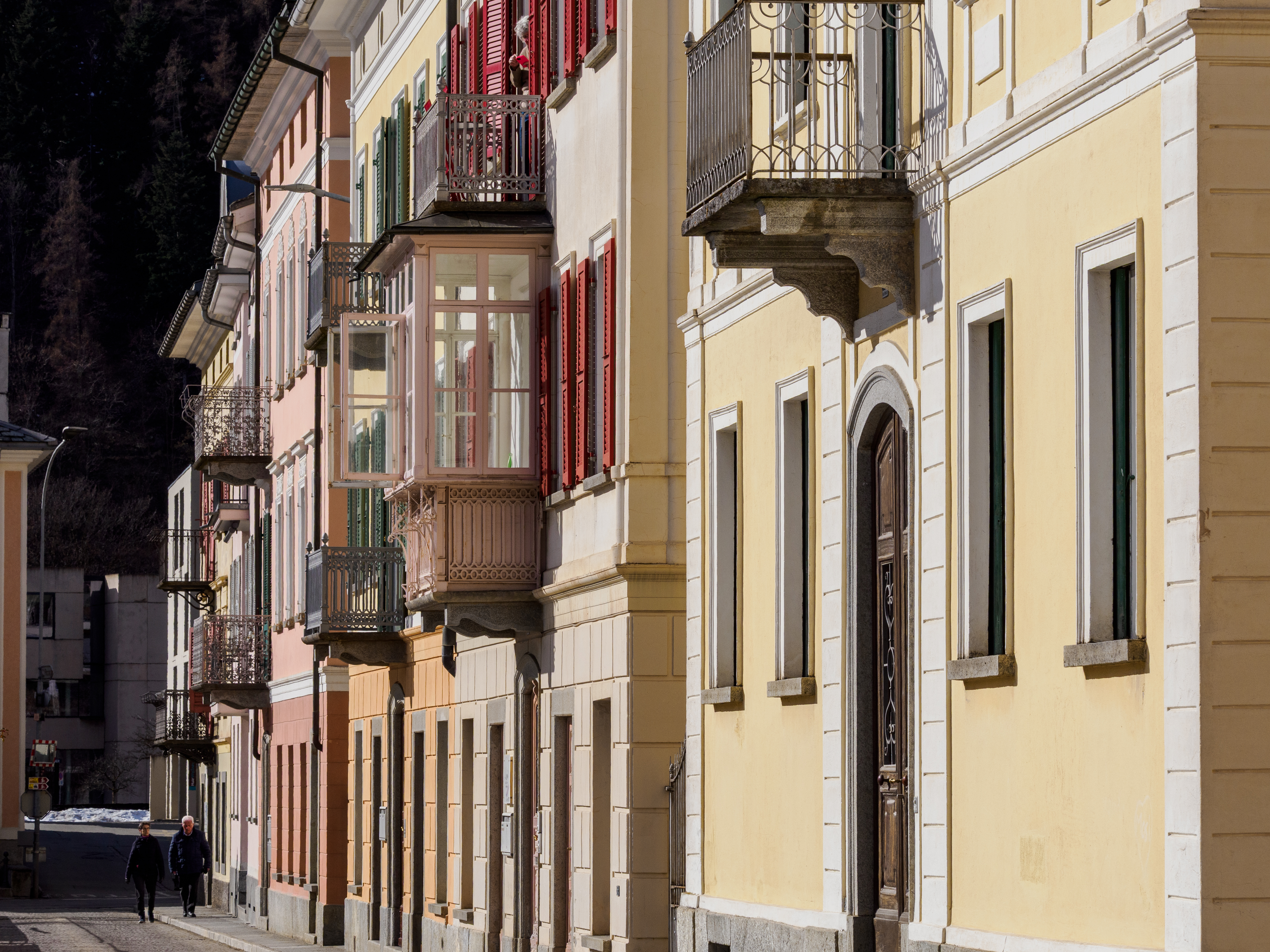
Via di Palazz

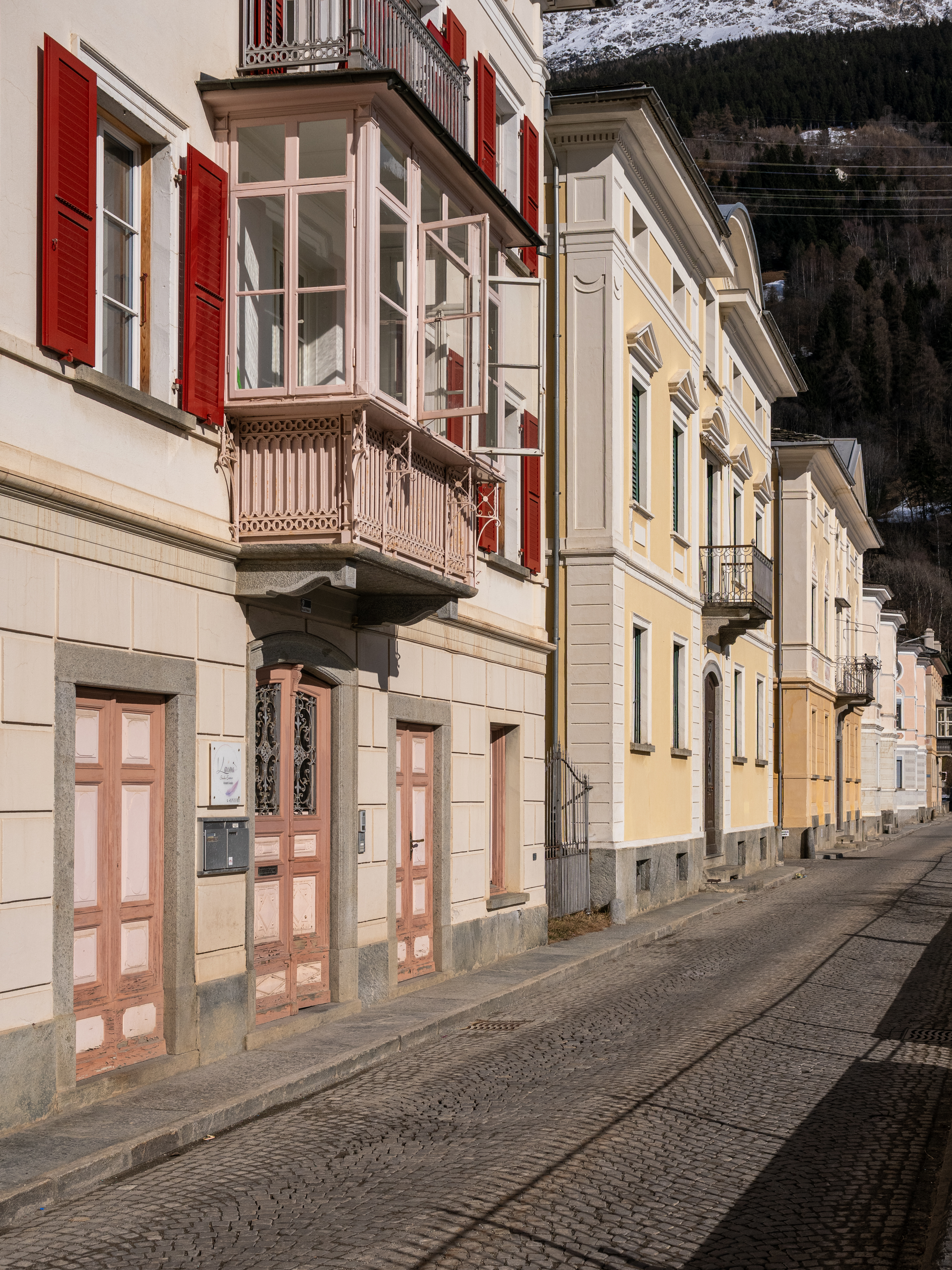
Via di Palazz 9 ff.

== Climate ==
Between 1991 and 2020 Poschiavo had an average of 101.2 days of rain per year and on average received 1,084 mm (42.7 in) of precipitation; the wettest month were June and August, during which time it received an average of 118 mm (4.6 in); during these months there was rain for an average of 10.8 days in June and 11.1 days in August. The driest month of the year was February with an average of 36 mm (1.4 in) over 4.5 days.

Climate data for Poschiavo/Robbia, elevation 1,078 m (3,537 ft), (1991–2020)
Month	Jan	Feb	Mar	Apr	May	Jun	Jul	Aug	Sep	Oct	Nov	Dec	Year
Mean daily maximum °C (°F)	3.8 (38.8)	5.0 (41.0)	9.3 (48.7)	13.1 (55.6)	17.1 (62.8)	21.1 (70.0)	22.9 (73.2)	22.5 (72.5)	17.7 (63.9)	13.1 (55.6)	8.1 (46.6)	4.6 (40.3)	13.2 (55.8)
Daily mean °C (°F)	−1.4 (29.5)	−0.3 (31.5)	3.7 (38.7)	7.4 (45.3)	11.3 (52.3)	14.9 (58.8)	16.5 (61.7)	16.1 (61.0)	12.1 (53.8)	7.9 (46.2)	3.3 (37.9)	−0.4 (31.3)	7.6 (45.7)
Mean daily minimum °C (°F)	−6.0 (21.2)	−5.1 (22.8)	−1.4 (29.5)	1.6 (34.9)	5.4 (41.7)	8.8 (47.8)	10.4 (50.7)	10.5 (50.9)	6.9 (44.4)	3.4 (38.1)	−0.6 (30.9)	−4.6 (23.7)	2.4 (36.3)
Average precipitation mm (inches)	51.3 (2.02)	35.5 (1.40)	48.2 (1.90)	77.8 (3.06)	97.8 (3.85)	117.5 (4.63)	111.3 (4.38)	117.7 (4.63)	105.8 (4.17)	132.2 (5.20)	121.5 (4.78)	67.0 (2.64)	1,083.6 (42.66)
Average snowfall cm (inches)	33.3 (13.1)	24.6 (9.7)	12.5 (4.9)	3.1 (1.2)	0.2 (0.1)	0.0 (0.0)	0.0 (0.0)	0.0 (0.0)	0.0 (0.0)	0.8 (0.3)	9.9 (3.9)	32.8 (12.9)	117.2 (46.1)
Average precipitation days (≥ 1.0 mm)	5.3	4.5	5.9	7.9	11.5	10.8	11.1	11.1	8.5	9.4	9.2	6.0	101.2
Average snowy days (≥ 1.0 cm)	4.4	4.0	2.1	0.8	0.1	0.0	0.0	0.0	0.0	0.2	1.7	3.9	17.2
Average relative humidity (%)	68	64	61	62	69	71	72	75	77	78	73	68	70
Mean monthly sunshine hours	95.0	104.5	135.7	130.6	140.3	155.5	171.0	154.1	123.6	106.9	82.1	79.2	1,478.5
Percentage possible sunshine	62	61	60	51	47	52	56	55	54	53	52	57	54
Source 1: NOAA
Source 2: MeteoSwiss

== See also ==
- Italian Grisons
- Poschiavino
