= Neuchâtel Airport =

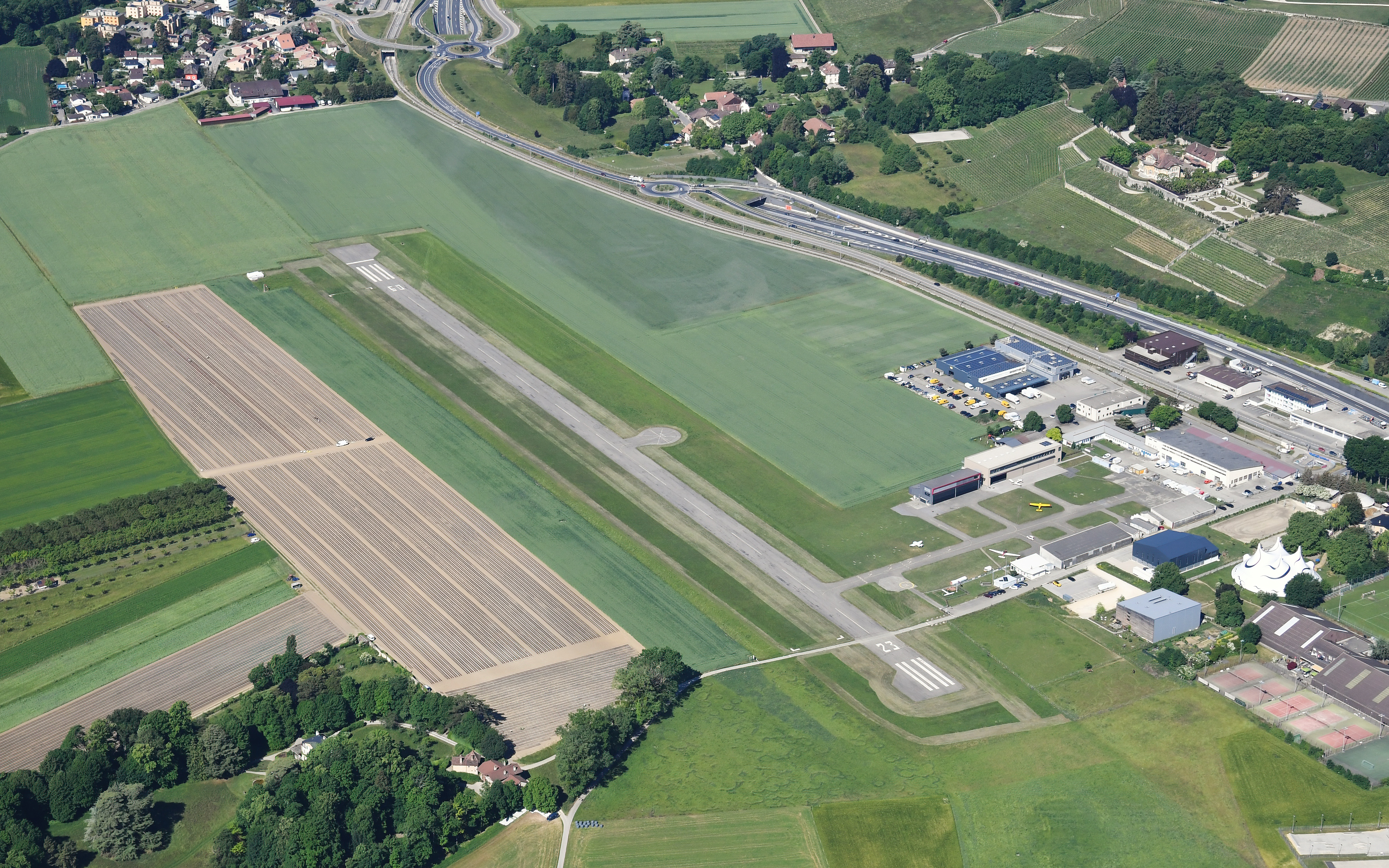
- Neuchâtel Airport from above
- IATA: none; ICAO: LSGN

Summary
- Airport type: Private
- Operator: Aeroport de Neuchâtel S.A.
- Serves: Neuchâtel
- Location: Neuchâtel, Switzerland
- Elevation AMSL: 1,427 ft (435 m)
- Coordinates: 46.957556°N 6.864907°E
- Website: neuchatel-airport.ch
- Interactive map of Neuchâtel Airport

Runways
Direction	Length		Surface
Direction	ft	m	Surface
05/23	2,297	700	Asphalt
05R/23L	1,804	550	Grass

Neuchâtel Airport (Note: French: Aéroport de Neuchâtel, German: Flugplatz Neuenberg, Italian: Aeroporto di Neuchâtel) (IATA: none, ICAO: LSGN) is an airport in Neuchâtel, Switzerland.

== History ==
Neuchâtel Airport was the location for German aviator Elly Beinhorn to fly from Europe to Africa in 1951, using a chartered Piper J-3C-65/L-4H Cub. It is the home of Swiss Flight Services, a private aviation company, who utilise Beechcraft and Cessna aircraft.

== Facilities ==
The airport has two runways. Runway one, designated 05/23 is asphalt paved measuring 700 x 20 meters (2297 x 66 feet). Runway two, designated 05R/23L is grass measuring 550 x 30 meters (1804 x 98 feet).

== Transport ==
The airport is served by the Colombier Chésards stop of the Neuchâtel suburban tramway line. An interchange of the A5 motorway is located within several hundred meters of the airport.

== See also ==
- Les Eplatures Airport - Another airport in the Neuchâtel canton
