= Trolleybuses in La Chaux-de-Fonds =

Transit system in Neuchâtel, Switzerland

La Chaux-de-Fonds trolleybus system
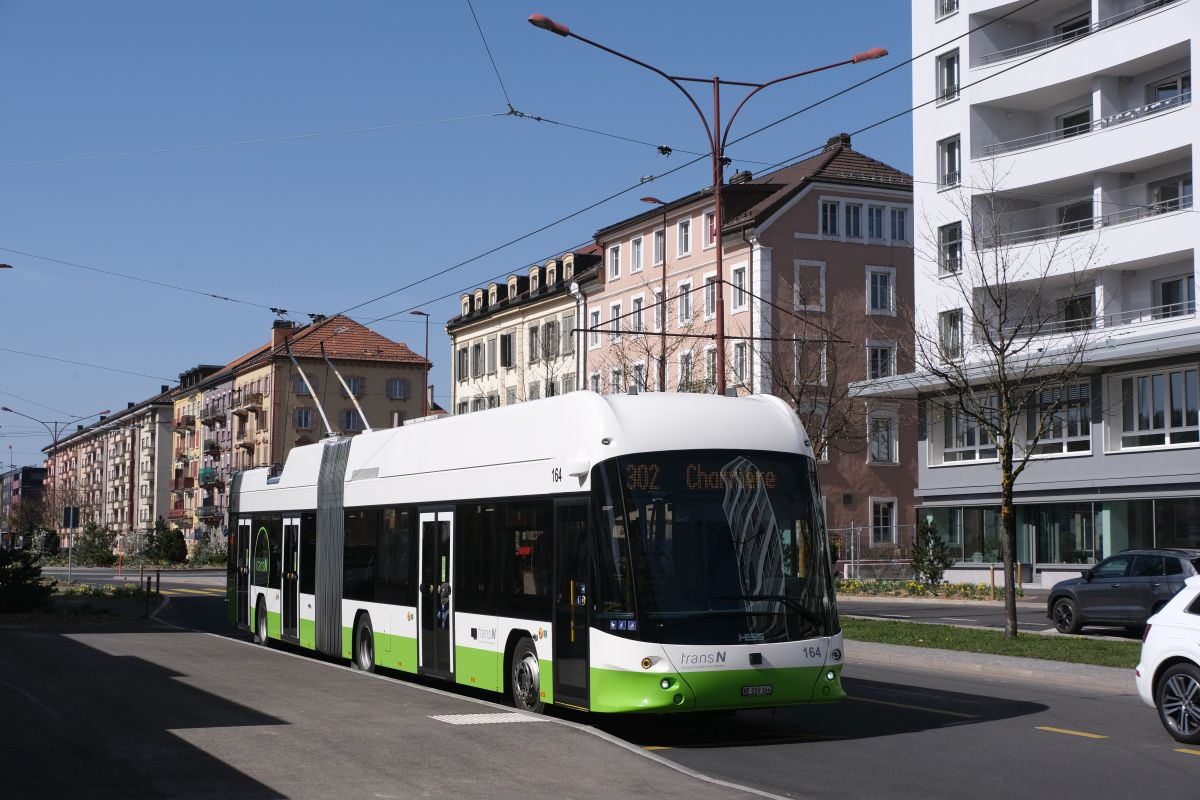
- A trolleybus on route 302 in 2026

Operation
- Locale: La Chaux-de-Fonds, Switzerland
- Open: 23 December 1949
- Status: Open
- Routes: 3 (currently 1 operational)
- Operator: Transports régionaux neuchâtelois (TRN)

Infrastructure
- Electrification: 600 V DC
- Depot: 1

Statistics
Overview
- Website: http://www.trn.ch/ Transports régionaux neuchâtelois (TRN) (in French)

The La Chaux-de-Fonds trolleybus system (French: Réseau trolleybus de La Chaux-de-Fonds) forms part of the public transport network in La Chaux-de-Fonds, in the canton of Neuchâtel, Switzerland.

Opened in 1949, the system gradually replaced the La Chaux-de-Fonds tramway network. Since 2005, it has been operated by Transports régionaux neuchâtelois (TRN, written "trn" in the authority's own marketing materials). It is supplemented by several bus lines operated by the same authority.

In April 2011, TRN announced that it wanted to replace the trolleybuses in La Chaux-de-Fonds by 2014 with hybrid buses, sparking vigorous protests. All trolleybus service has been suspended since May 2014, initially because of a major project to rebuild the square in front of the railway station, including relocation of the bus terminal. After a period of some years in which it was unclear whether the system would ever reopen, in 2021 it was announced that a reopening by 2023 was planned. This was later delayed to 2024, and subsequently to February 2026. Trolleybus service began on 20 February 2026, initially only on line 302 (former line 2), but lines 301 and 304 (former 1 and 4) are expected to follow.

== History ==
The system was opened on 23 December 1949. Its initial operating company was the Compagnie des Transports en commun, La Chaux-de-Fonds (TN). The system's first trolleybus line was the 3.54 km (2.20 mi) long Centenaire–Hôpital route, which had previously been served by trams. On 16 June 1950, the last remaining tram line was replaced by trolleybuses.

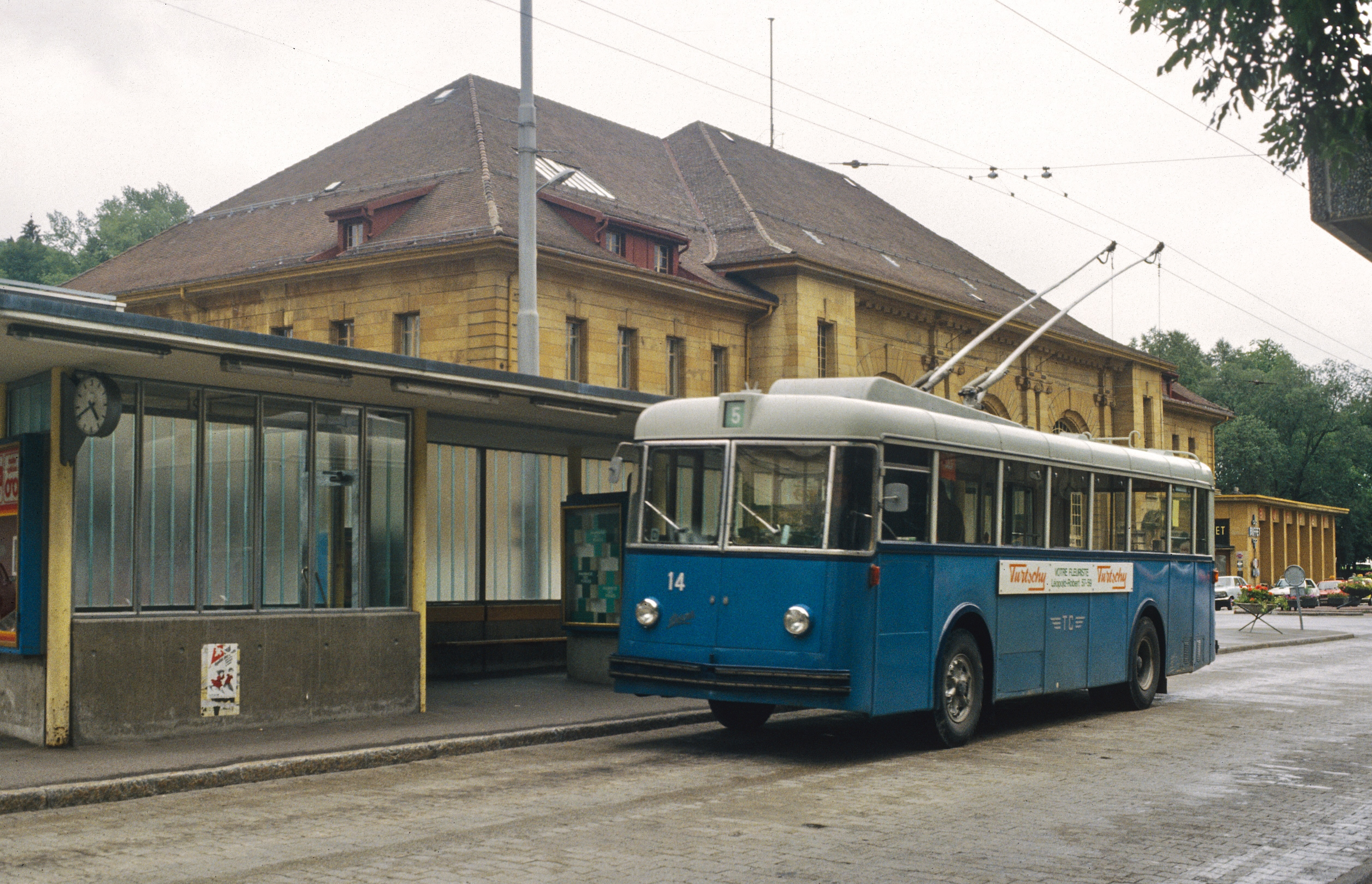
Trolleybus 14, built in 1954 by Berna, at the railway station in 1981

On 13 November 1954, La Chaux-de-Fonds' only conventional bus line, which had been operating since 1948, was converted into a trolleybus line. That left the trolleybus system as the town's only form of public transport.

In 1960, the system was transformed into a network of three cross-city lines. These were designated as 1–2, 4–5 and 6–7, to reflect the names of their termini. Each line was operated at 12-minute intervals, with services being at 6-minute intervals during peak times. In 1975, diesel bus route 9, which had been opened in 1966, was converted to trolleybus operation, and the following year the line to terminal 6 was extended.

On 28 May 1990, the line to terminus 7 was converted to diesel operation, and simultaneously a new line numbering scheme was introduced. The remaining trolleybus lines were renumbered as lines 1 and 4. In 1995, following the construction of a new depot, line 2 reverted to a trolleybus line. Two years later, on 1 November 1997, trolleybuses were reintroduced to line 4, after that line had been operated by diesel buses for several years. Line 4 was also given a short extension, to Eplatures.

Following a merger in 2005, Transports régionaux neuchâtelois (TRN) assumed responsibility for trolleybus operations.

In April 2011, TRN announced that it wanted to replace the trolleybuses in La Chaux-de-Fonds by 2014 with hybrid buses, sparking vigorous protests. Two main reasons were given for TRN's decision: the many road work sites in the city hinder the circulation of trolleybuses, and the forthcoming redevelopment of the Place de la Gare would require an investment of 2.5 million Swiss francs just to move the overhead wires as part of the relocation of the bus terminal. Additionally, new trolleybuses, at 1.3 million francs per vehicle, were said to be much more costly to acquire than new hybrid buses, at 800,000 francs each.

Effective 21 May 2014, all trolleybus service was suspended for the start of work on demolition and relocation of the bus terminal in front of the railway station, with removal of the trolleybus wiring there. At that time, TRN had not yet decided whether the wiring would be reinstated after completion of the work on the bus terminal, leaving open the possibility that the current suspension might eventually be made a permanent closure.

In 2021, the Neuchâtel cantonal government announced that a reopening by 2023 is planned, after the acquisition of new trolleybuses. Most of the system's overhead wiring has been kept in place since the suspension that began in 2014. In connection with this plan, a new Van Hool trolleybus from the Geneva trolleybus system was brought to La Chaux-de-Fonds and made a test run under the wiring there on 25 November 2021. An order for 18 new trolleybuses was placed with Carrosserie Hess in 2021, with six due for delivery in 2023 and the other 12 not until 2026. As of autumn 2024, reopening of the trolleybus system was expected to take place in the first half of 2025, but was subsequently delayed and occurred on 20 February 2026.

== Lines ==
The system until 2014 was made up of the following cross-city routes, all operated at 10-minute intervals:

1	Recorne–Arêtes	Articulated vehicle
2	Combe à l'Ours–Charrière	Rigid bus
4	Eplatures–Hôpital	Articulated vehicle

All service has been temporarily operated by diesel buses since 2014. However, even before that indefinite suspension, lines 1 and 4 were replaced by diesel bus lines 52 and 54 in the evenings and on Sundays and public holidays, so that during those off-peak times only line 1 was operating as a trolleybus line.

== Fleet ==
=== Former fleet ===
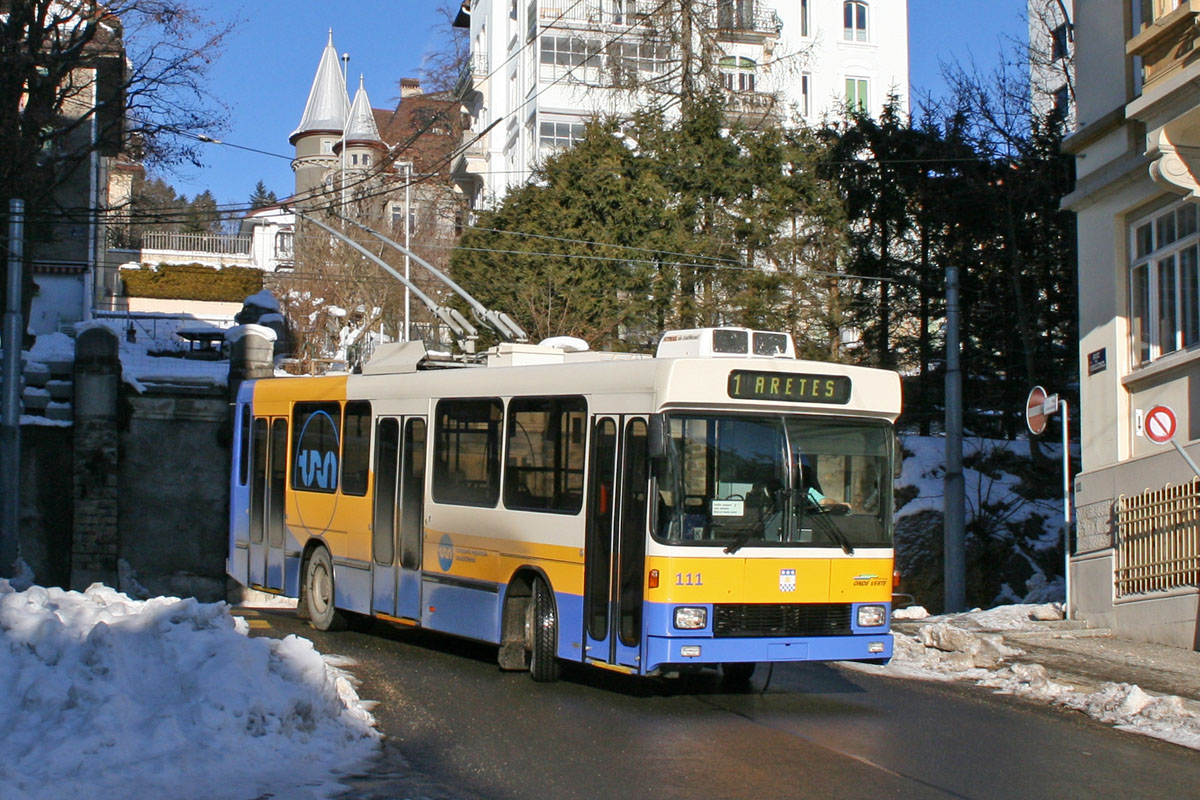
1990-built NAW/Hess trolleybus No. 111 in 2007

Initially, the La Chaux-de-Fonds trolleybus system had a fleet of 10 short two-axle vehicles. Six additional new trolleybuses later joined the fleet as three sets of twins, delivered in 1954, 1961 and 1965, respectively. Another 13 vehicles were acquired secondhand.

Between 1978 and 1982, TN bought eight new trolleybuses with secondhand electrical equipment from the Geneva system, and unsuccessfully tested a secondhand vehicle from the Lucerne system.

In 1990, three new rigid trolleybuses were introduced to the fleet. They were NAW / Hess BT 5-25 type vehicles, and were given the fleet numbers 111 to 113. The last three high-floor vehicles in the fleet, they were withdrawn from service between the end of 2007 and the end of 2010. Their replacements, diesel-powered buses, were used alternately with trolleybuses on the trolleybus lines.

As of 2010, before the 2014 suspension, the following 12 vehicles were available to operate trolleybus services in La Chaux-de-Fonds, all of them low-floor buses. At that time, the La Chaux-de-Fonds system was, along with the Lausanne system and the Lucerne system, one of only three Swiss trolleybus systems still using rigid (two-axle) trolleybuses. These 12 vehicles were all subsequently sold, the articulated Hess units to the Neuchâtel system, in 2012–2014, the articulated Solaris units to the Salzburg trolleybus system, in 2012, and the two-axle Solaris units to the Ostrava transit system, in 2015.

Fleet nos	Quantity	Manufacturer	Electrics	Type	Configuration	Built
121–125	5	NAW / Hess	Siemens	BGT-N	Articulated	1996
131–133	3	Solaris	Cegelec	Trollino 12 AC	Rigid	2005
141–144	4	Solaris	Cegelec	Trollino 18 AC	Articulated	2005

=== New fleet on order ===
After it was decided to reopen the system, an order was placed with Carrosserie Hess in 2021 for 18 new articulated trolleybuses of the type LighTram 19DC, with six due for delivery in 2023 and the other 12 not until 2026.

== See also ==
- List of trolleybus systems in Switzerland
