= Trolleybuses in Neuchâtel =

Swiss trolleybus system

Neuchâtel trolleybus system
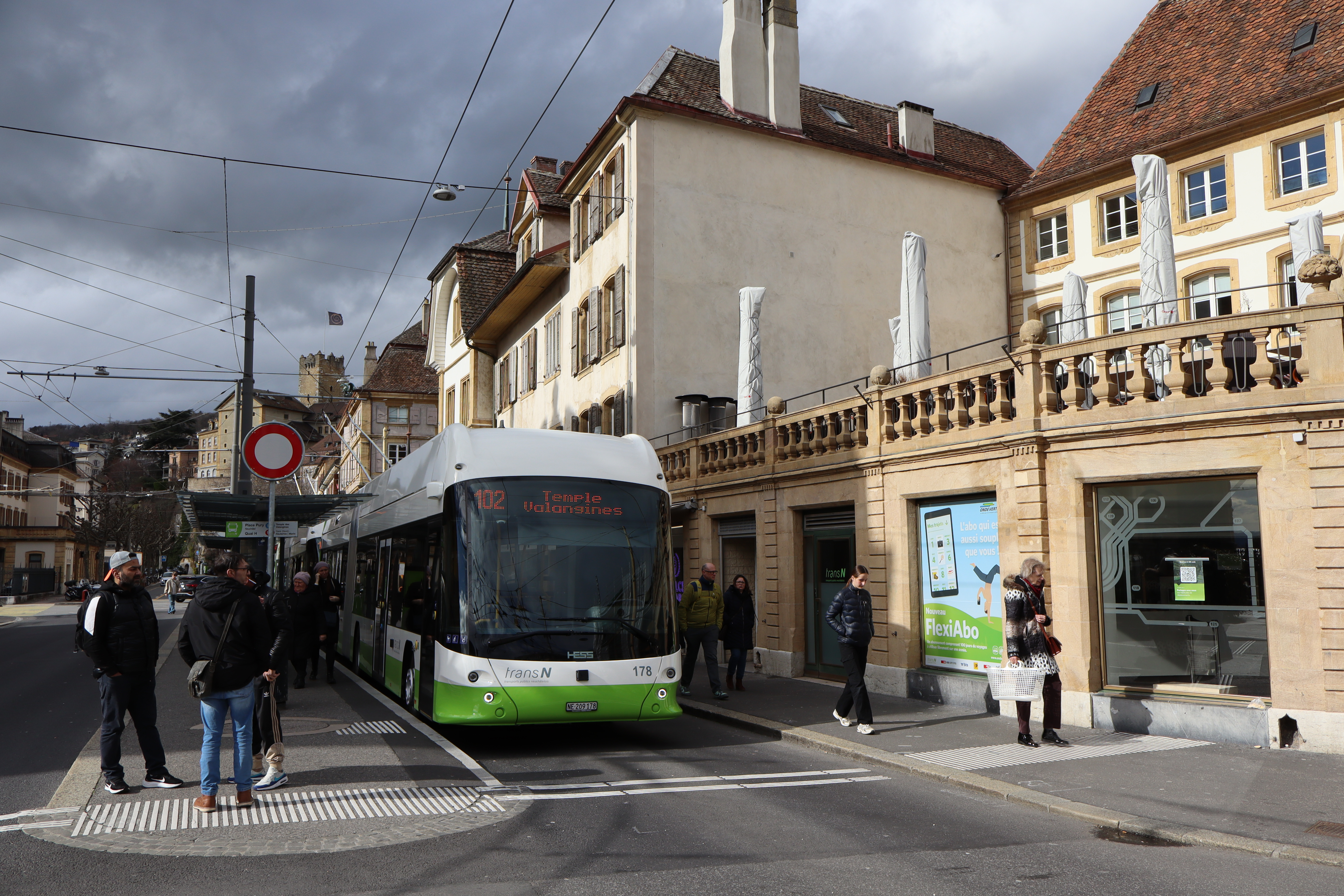
- A Hess trolleybus in Neuchâtel, 2024

Operation
- Locale: Neuchâtel, Switzerland
- Open: 16 February 1940
- Status: Open
- Routes: 3
- Operator: Transports publics Neuchâtelois

Infrastructure
- Electrification: 600 V DC

Statistics
- Route length: 25.7 km
- current: 10.6 million/year
Overview
- Website: www.transn.ch

The Neuchâtel trolleybus system (French: Réseau de trolleybus de Neuchâtel) is part of the public transport network in Neuchâtel, Switzerland. Opened in 1940, it gradually replaced the urban lines of the Neuchâtel tramway network.

The system currently also serves the neighbouring municipalities of Auvernier, Peseux, Corcelles-Cormondrèche, Hauterive, Saint-Blaise and La Tène. It is operated by Transports publics Neuchâtelois (TN), which also runs an interurban tramway to Boudry and various conventional bus lines.

== Current routes ==
As of 2019 there are three trolleybus routes in Neuchâtel (route 107 is a radial route; the other two routes are cross-city routes):

101	Cormondrèche–Place Pury–Marin-Epagnier Gare	7.5 minute intervals	12.9 km
102	Temple des Valangines–Serrières	10-minute intervals	4.7 km
107	Place Pury–Hauterive (–Marin-Epagnier Gare)	7.5 minute intervals	8.1 km

== History ==
The individual sections of trolleybus line in Neuchâtel went into service as follows:

Route no.	Opening date	Section (or route)	Notes
2	16 February 1940	Place Pury – Serrières	Was extended by about 300 m in Serrières in May 1975. Absorbed by route 1 in 1985
8	21 May 1949	Place Pury – Temple des Valangines	
4	1 July 1949	Place Pury – Vauseyon – Valangin (–Cernier)	Including interurban section to Cernier, operated jointly by TN and the Val-de-Ruz company
1	1 July 1957	Place Pury – Monruz	First stage of replacement of tram route 1; motorbuses temporarily used beyond Monruz
1	29 August 1957	Monruz – Saint-Blaise	Completion of replacement of tram route 1, becoming Place Pury – St. Blaise. Through-routed with route 2 to Serrières
6	20 August 1964	Place Pury – Gare CFF	Replacement of tram route 6
7	20 August 1964	Place Pury – La Coudre	Replacement of tram route 7
7	15 February 1969	La Coudre – Hauterive	Extension of about 1 km
3	c. 30 August 1976	Place Pury – Corcelles-Collège	First stage of replacement of tram route 3
3	c. November 1976	Corcelles-Collège – Cormondrèche	Extension of about 300 metres
1	9 October 1978	Saint-Blaise – Marin-Epagnier Gare	Extension
7	3 October 1994	Hauterive – Marin	Extension

Note: Opening dates above indicate the start of trolleybus service, where known. In cases of new trolleybus routes converted from tram lines, trams were replaced by a temporary motorbus service while the overhead wiring was modified, and thus the first day of trolleybus service did not immediately follow the last day of tram service.

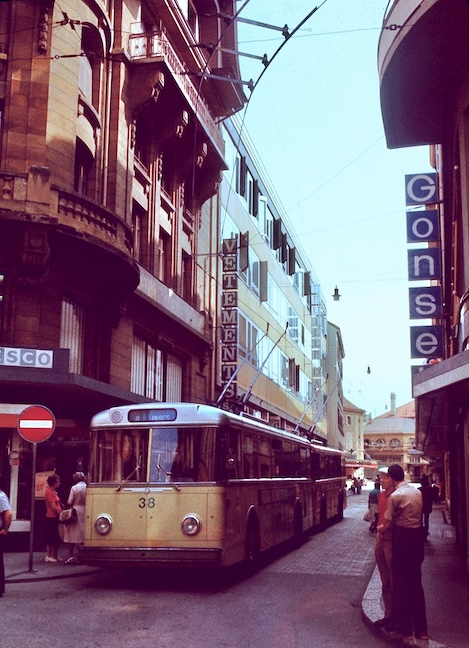
Until 1991, the city centre terminus of routes 7 and 8 was on narrow Rue St. Maurice.

Opened in 1949, route 4 included interurban trolleybus service to Cernier, in the Val-de-Ruz, replacing a tramway as far as Valangin and motorbus service of the Val-de-Ruz transport company (VR) between there and Cernier. Service was jointly operated by TN and by VR, which operated the Val-de-Ruz trolleybus system (opened in 1948), with TN trolleybuses reaching Cernier and VR trolleybuses reaching Place Pury in Neuchâtel. However, most journeys on TN route 4 operated only between Neuchâtel and Valangin. Trolleybus route 4 and VR's Valangin–Cernier section both closed on 2 November 1969, and that was the final day of trolleybus service between the Val-de-Ruz and Neuchâtel.

Routes 1 (city centre – St. Blaise) and 2 (city centre – Serrières) were through-routed for many years, from the opening of route 1 in 1957 until 1981, with trolleybuses displaying route number "1" when bound for St. Blaise and "2" when bound for Serrières. They were separated in 1981, but re-connected in 1985, and the full route became route 1 at the latter date, with route "2" ceasing to exist (it was reintroduced in May 1994).

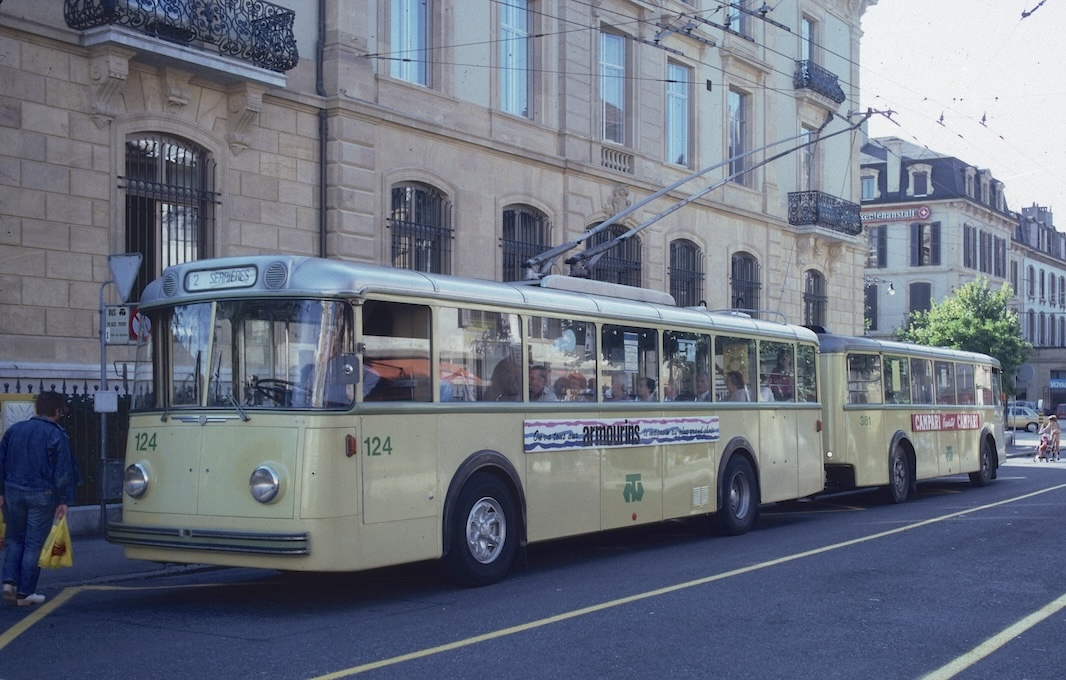
Saurer trolleybus 124 towing trailer 381 on route 2 in 1983. The use of trailers ended in 1984.

On 8 July 1991, route 1 replaced route 3, making route 1 Cormondrèche–Place Pury–St. Blaise–Marin, and the Place Pury to Serrières section was taken over by route 7. On the same date, route 8 was extended to Place Pury. Routes 7 and 8 had both terminated on Rue St. Maurice and run inbound via that street and outbound via Rue du Bassin and Rue St. Honoré, and the July 1991 service changes brought to an end the regular operation of trolleybuses along Rue St. Maurice and Rue du Bassin, but the wiring remained in place until at least 2002.

On 29 May 1994, route 7 reverted to operating Place Pury–Hauterive, and the designation route "2" was revived for the 2.6 km-long (1.6 mi) Place Pury–Serrières section. At the opposite end of route 7, the trolleybus wires were extended from Hauterive to Marin, for access to a new depot opening there in September 1994, and starting on 3 October 1994 three route 7 trips per day operated through to or from Marin. In June 1996, route 7 began serving Marin at all times and days except evenings and Sundays, but with half of its scheduled non-rush-hours trips still terminating at Hauterive.

Route 6 was converted to diesel buses on 19 March 2001 and discontinued entirely in June 2001, with realignment of the roadway in front of the railway station following.

The routes were renumbered 101, 102, 107, and 108 in December 2013. One year later, on 14 December 2014, routes 102 and 108 – which had already been through-routed for several years – were combined as a single route, 102.

== Fleet ==
=== Past fleet, after 1992 ===
Since 1992, Neuchâtel's trolleybus fleet has consisted exclusively of articulated vehicles, the last two-axle vehicles having been withdrawn in spring 1992.

Fleet numbers	Quantity	Manufacturer	Electrics	Model	Type	Year built	Last units withdrawn	Notes
151–160	10	FBW / Hess	BBC	91GTS	High-floor	1976	2005	
161–172	12	FBW / Hess	BBC	91GTS	High-floor	1983–84	2011	
101–121	21	NAW / Hess	ABB	BGT 5-25	High-floor	1991	2024	First unit built in 1990. No. 121 was renumbered 621 in 2013, after the arrival of ex-La Chaux-de-Fonds 121.
121–125	5	NAW / Hess		Swisstrolley 2 / BGT-N2	Low-floor	1996	2015	Ex-La Chaux-de-Fonds 121–125 in 2012–13

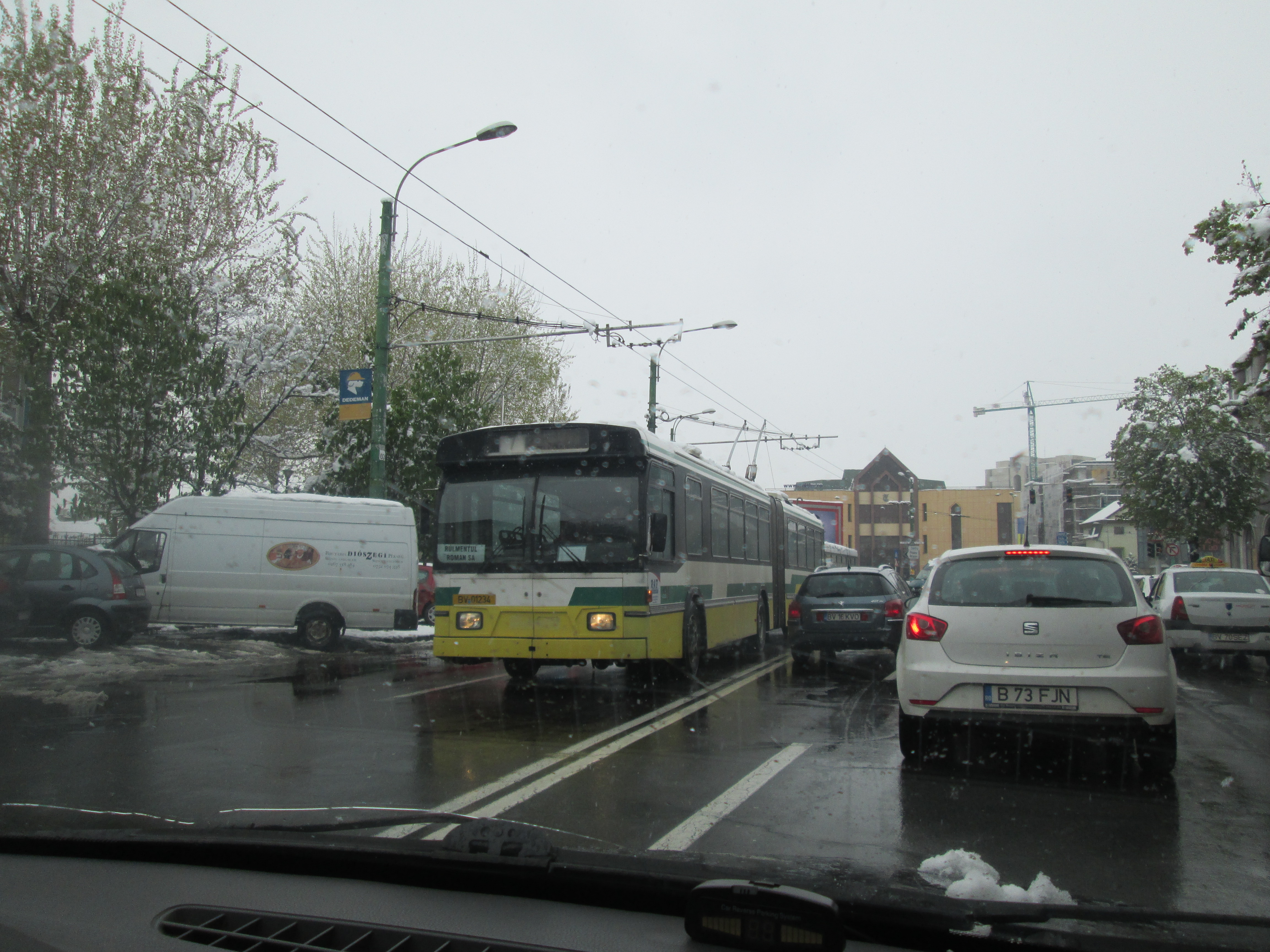
Ex-Neuchâtel trolleybus in service in Brașov, Romania, still wearing Neuchatel livery

The NAW trolleybuses 101–121 were the last high-floor trolleybuses in service in Switzerland, and by at least 2023, the Milan trolleybus system was the only other system in all of Western Europe still operating high-floor vehicles. The last active units of this Neuchâtel series were initially retired in December 2023, but some were returned to use in early 2024 because of temporary reliability problems with the Hess LighTram trolleybuses that replaced them. The last high-floor trolleybuses were withdrawn again by mid-April 2024, with a ceremonial "farewell" tour being operated on 11 September 2024 to mark their formal withdrawal.

=== Current fleet ===
Low-floor, articulated vehicles now make up the entire fleet.

Fleet numbers	Quantity	Manufacturer	Electrics	Model	Year built
131–150	20	Hess		Swisstrolley 3 / BGT N2C	2009–2011
161–178	18	Hess		LighTram 19 DC	2023–2024

As there were no low-floor trolleybuses in the fleet prior to the delivery of the BGT-N2C type Swisstrolleys, lines 1 and 7 were operated between 2004 and 2010 by a mixed fleet of trolleybuses and low-floor diesel buses. Under that arrangement, the travelling public was offered at least some barrier-free trips – which were identified in the timetable.

== See also ==
- List of trolleybus systems in Switzerland
- Trams in Neuchâtel
