= Trams in Neuchâtel =

Tramway system in Neuchâtel, Switzerland

Coordinates: 46°59′22″N 6°55′41″E

Neuchâtel tramway
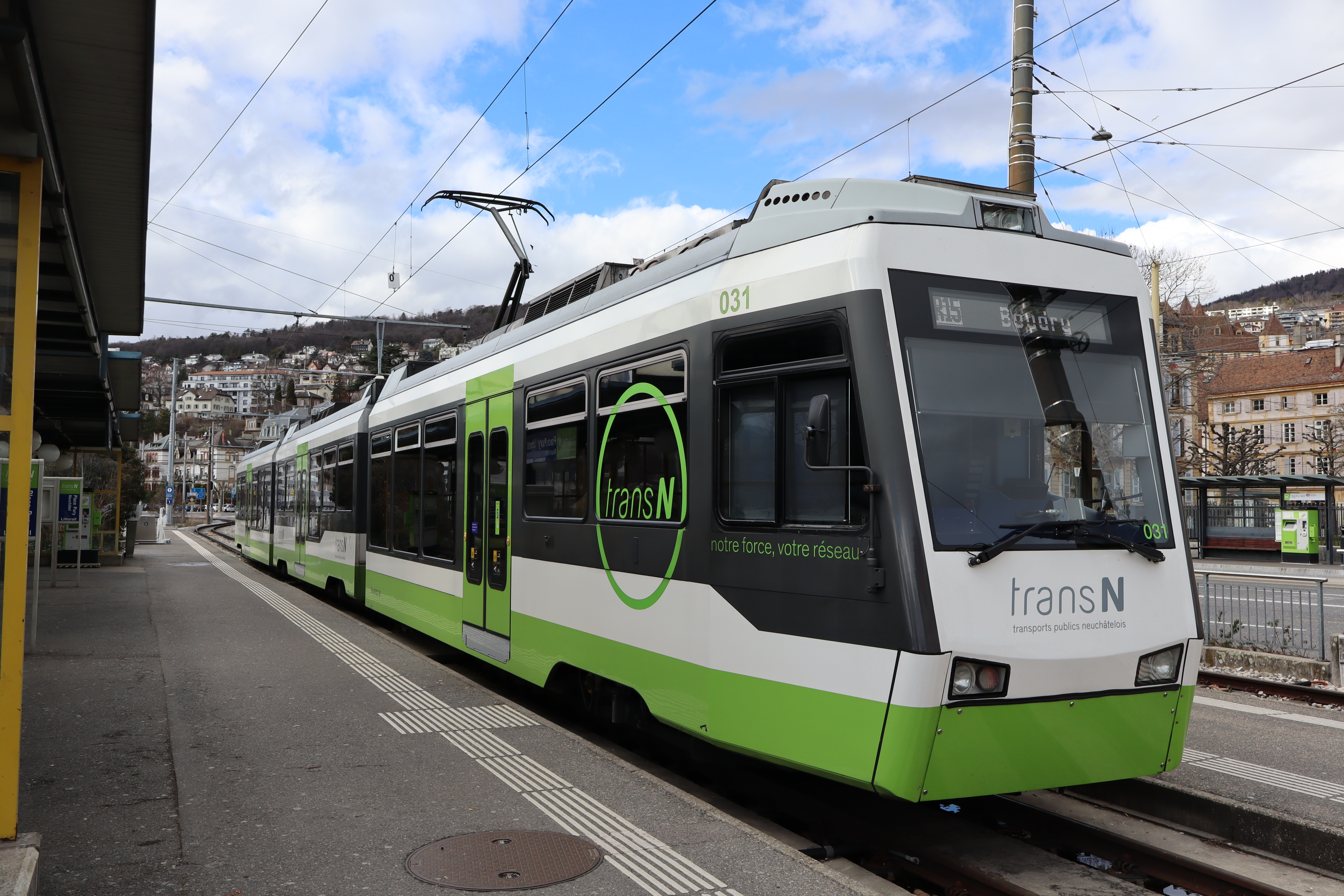
- The Neuchâtel-Boudry tramway at the Neuchâtel station

Operation
- Locale: Neuchâtel, Switzerland
- Open: 16 September 1892
- Status: Open
- Lines: 1
- Operator: Transports publics Neuchâtelois

Infrastructure
- Track gauge: 1,000 mm (3 ft 3 3/8 in) metre gauge
- Electrification: 600 V DC, overhead lines

Statistics
- Route length: 8.85 km (5.50 mi)
Overview
- Website: http://www.tnneuchatel.ch/ Transports en commun de Neuchâtel et environs (TN) (in French)

The Neuchâtel tramway (French: Tramway de Neuchâtel, or (locally) Tram) is a tramway forming part of the public transport system in Neuchâtel, a city in Switzerland.

Opened in 1892, the tramway has waxed and waned over the years. Currently, it comprises only one 8.85 km (5.50 mi) long interurban line, which runs via Auvernier and Colombier to Boudry, and is designated as line 5. All of the system's urban tram lines were converted to trolleybuses, the last such closure and conversion taking place in 1976, leaving just interurban line 5 (present line 215).

The tramway is currently operated by Transports publics Neuchâtelois (transN) (formerly Compagnie des Tramways de Neuchâtel), which also runs three funiculars, the Neuchâtel trolleybus system and various conventional bus lines.

== History ==
=== Interurban line ===
The line to Boudry, including an Areuse-to-Cortaillod branch line 830 m (2,720 ft) long, was opened on 16 September 1892 by the former company Régional Neuchâtel-Boudry Cortaillod (NCB). It was originally a steam tramway, until in 1902 it was electrified at 600 volts DC.

The branch line to Cortaillod was permanently converted to bus operation on 2 June 1984, and is now served by line 5b.

Since its modernisation in the early 1980s, the line to Boudry has mostly been called Littorail. This expression is a composition of the word Littoral (French for coast in general, or for the coastal region of Lake Neuchâtel in particular) and rail (French for rail). The modernisation included equipping the line with automatic block signalling.

Today, trams run to Boudry at rigid 20-minute intervals and serve a total of twelve stops. The average distance between stops is 805 m (2,641 ft). The line to Boudry is mostly single-track, and runs on its own right-of-way, independently of road traffic. In similar fashion to a classic railway, it is controlled by automatic block signalling, as previously noted, and equipped with push button interlocking. The line is operated with bi-directional vehicles, and the travel time is either 16 or 18 minutes, depending upon the direction of travel.

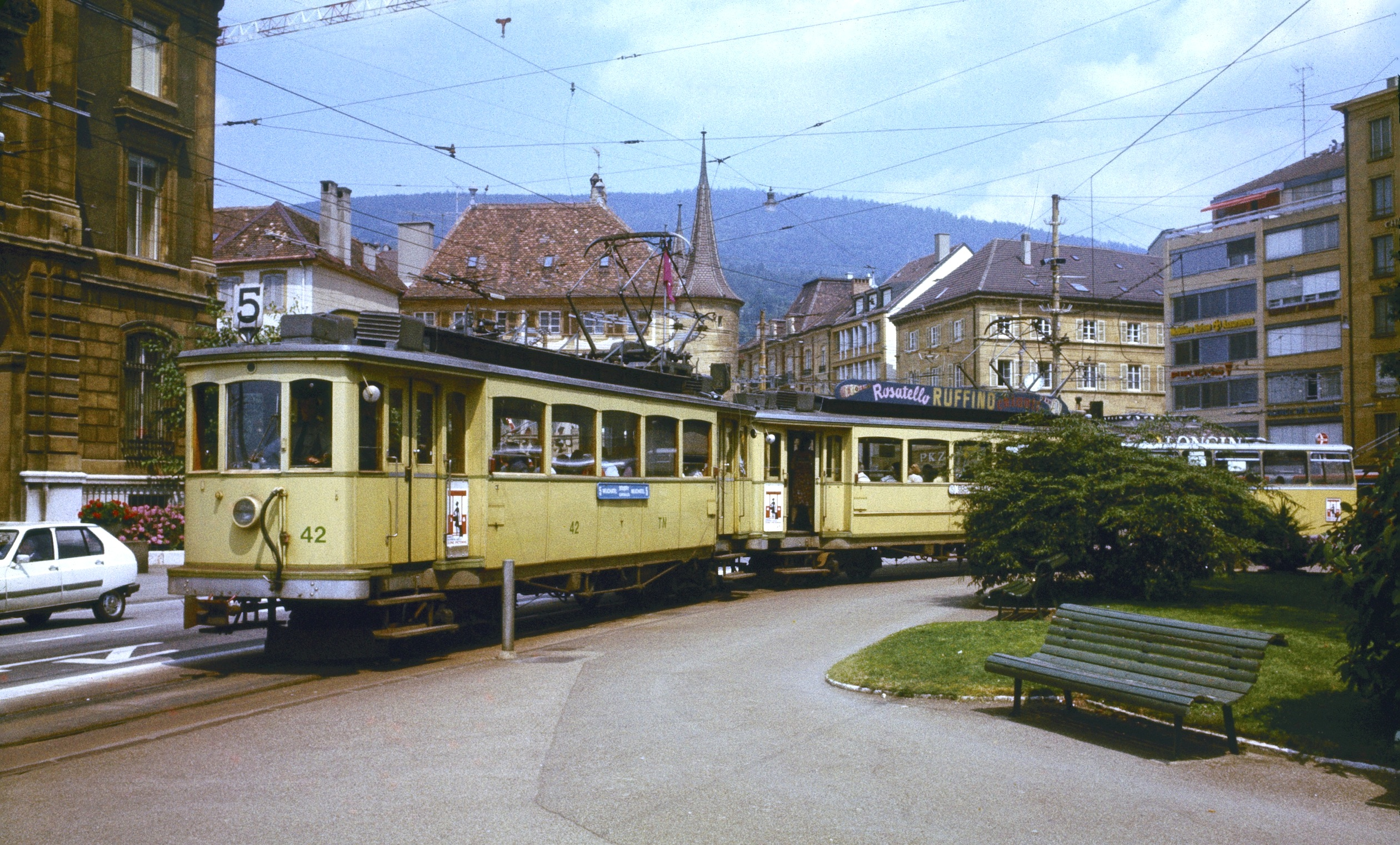
A route 5 tram set composed of 1902-built cars leaving the former Place Pury turning loop, in 1979. The trams of this type were in service for nearly 80 years.

Until early 1988, the line's Neuchâtel terminus was a loop through the centre of Place Pury. The loop was abandoned at that time, to facilitate the planned construction (later) of an underground public parking garage, and replaced by a two-track stub terminus to the west. It is located about 40 metres (130 ft) west of Place Pury, but is still referred to by TN as Neuchâtel Place Pury terminus.

The now one-line system has two carhouses (or depots) for maintenance and housing of the fleet. One is at Boudry terminus, and the other is in Neuchâtel, called Evole depot and located along line 5, about 400 m (1,300 ft) west of the Place Pury terminus. The current Boudry carhouse was built in 1985, replacing a smaller facility.

=== Urban lines ===
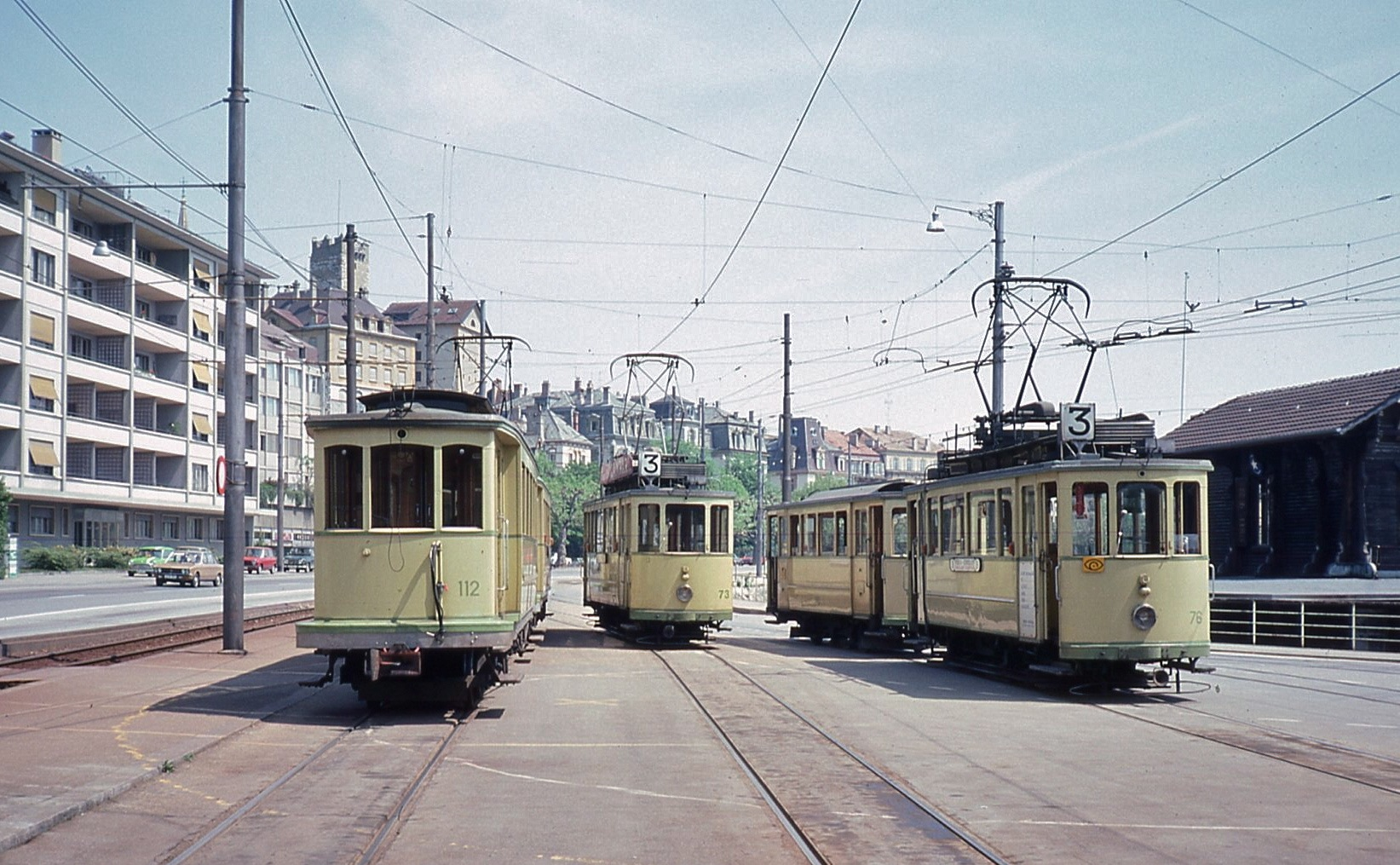
Trams at Evole depot in Neuchâtel in 1976

The first urban tramway in Neuchâtel, to Saint-Blaise, went into operation on 16 September 1893, and was originally powered by gas. For this first line, the Tramway Neuchâtel–Saint-Blaise (NSB) was responsible. On 22 December 1894, due to technical problems with the gas-engined vehicles, the line was converted into a horsecar line (Alemannic German: Rösslitram). For the horsecar operations, the NSB procured six small lightweight trams, each of which was hauled by one horse.

In 1897, the first urban line was finally electrified. The following year, a Port–Gare (railway station) line was opened. In subsequent years, the first two urban lines were joined by the following lines:

- 1899: Place Pury–Serrières
- 1901: Place-Pury–Vauseyon
- 1902: Peseux–Corcelles

Meanwhile, in 1901, the NSB merged with the NCB to form the Compagnie des Tramways de Neuchâtel.

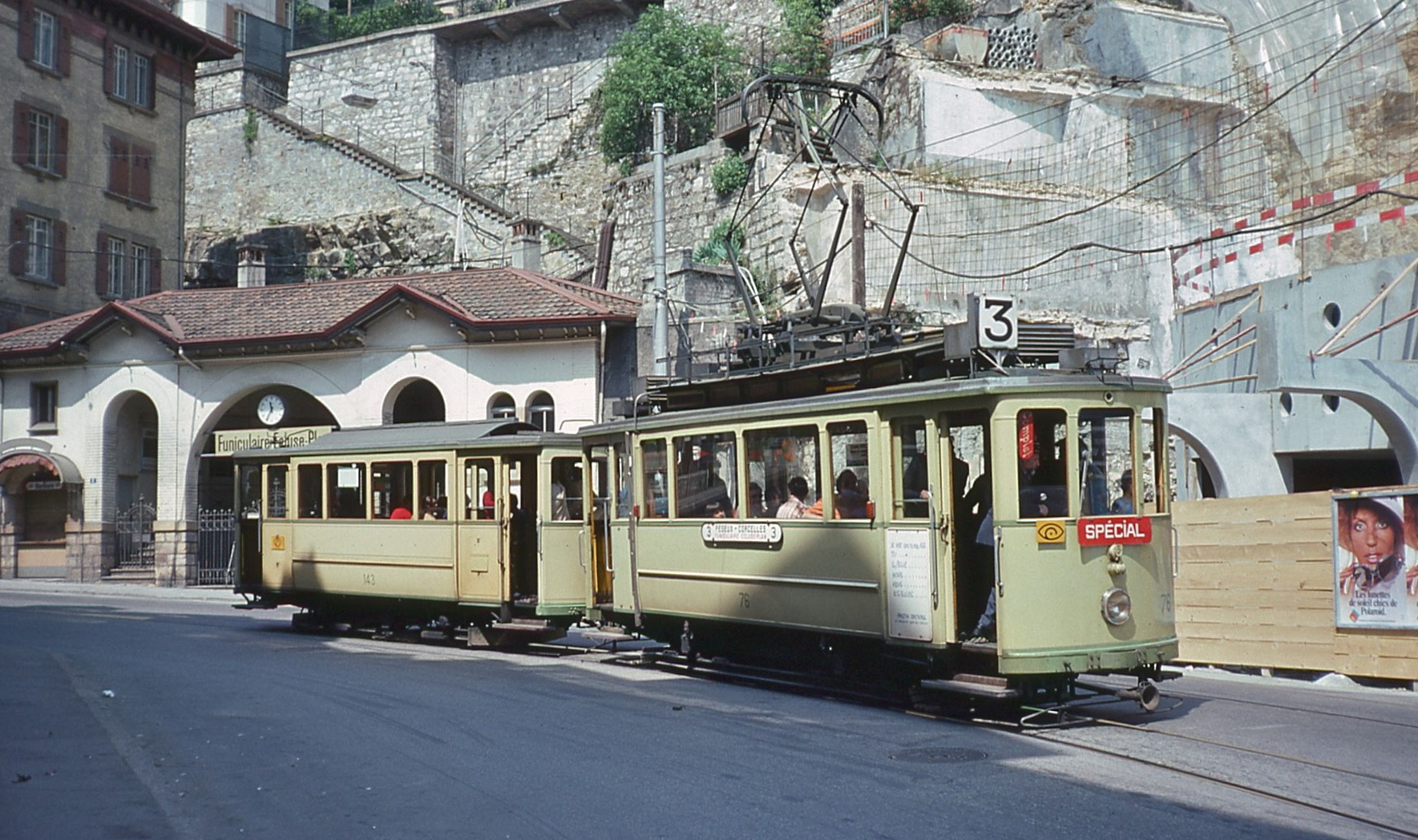
A tram set on route 3, the last urban route, in May 1976

The city's tramway network was subsequently expanded further, and in 1926 reached its maximum route length of 27 km (17 mi). Up to six urban lines were in operation at any one time. They were numbered 1, 2, 3, 4, 6 and 7, and most started at Place Pury, in the city centre. Line 4 included interurban service to Cernier.

Between 1940 and 1976, the urban tram lines were progressively replaced by trolleybus lines, which kept the same numbers. First to close was line 2, to Serrieres, in 1940. Line 4 to Valangin followed in 1949, line 1 to St. Blaise in 1957, and lines 6 and 7 to Neuchâtel railway station (Gare CFF) and La Coudre, respectively, in 1964. The final urban tram line to close was line 3, from Place Pury to Corcelles. Its final day as a tram service was 11 July 1976.

== Fleet ==
=== Past fleet ===
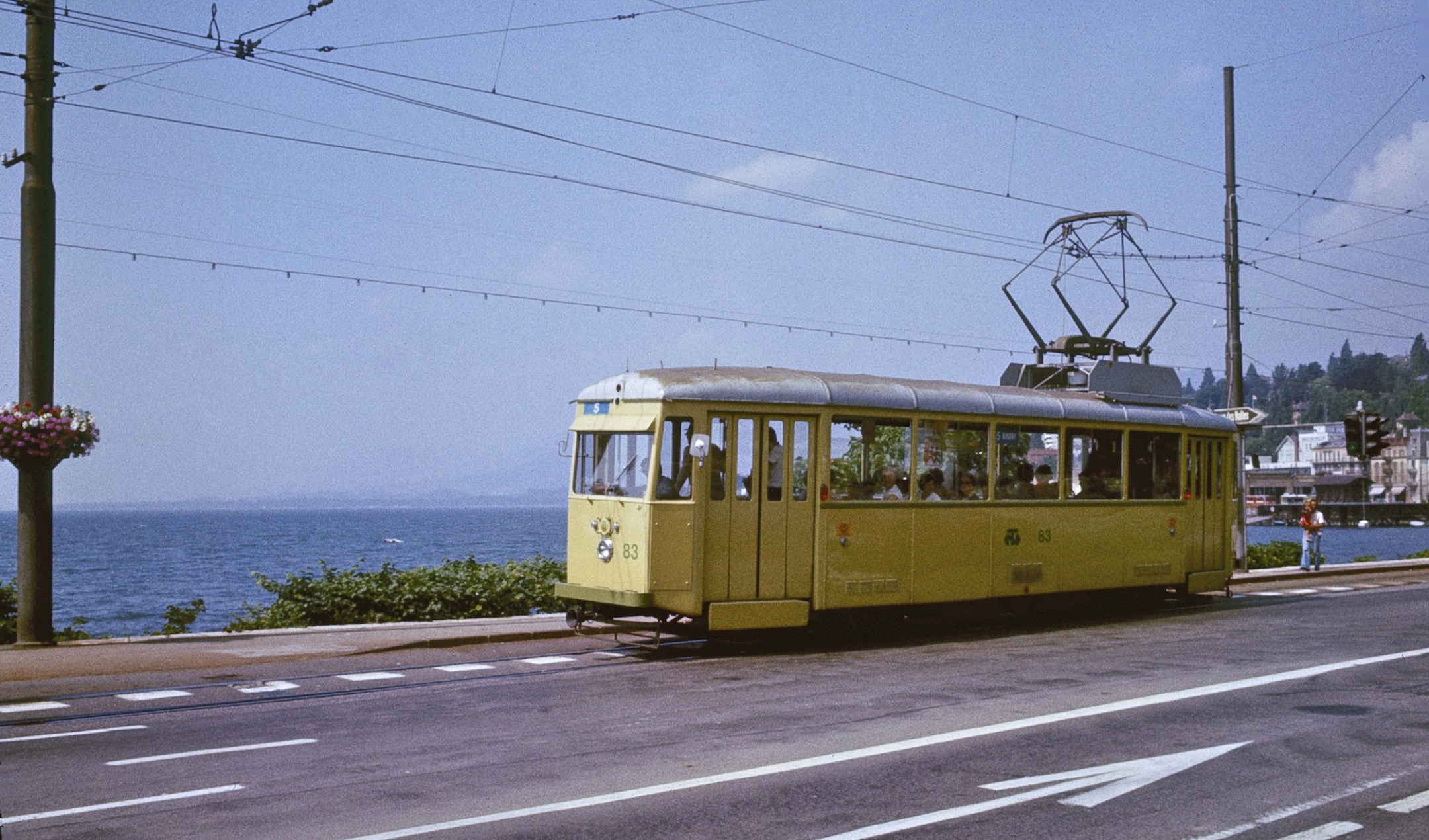
1947-built Swiss Standard tram 83 with Lake Neuchâtel

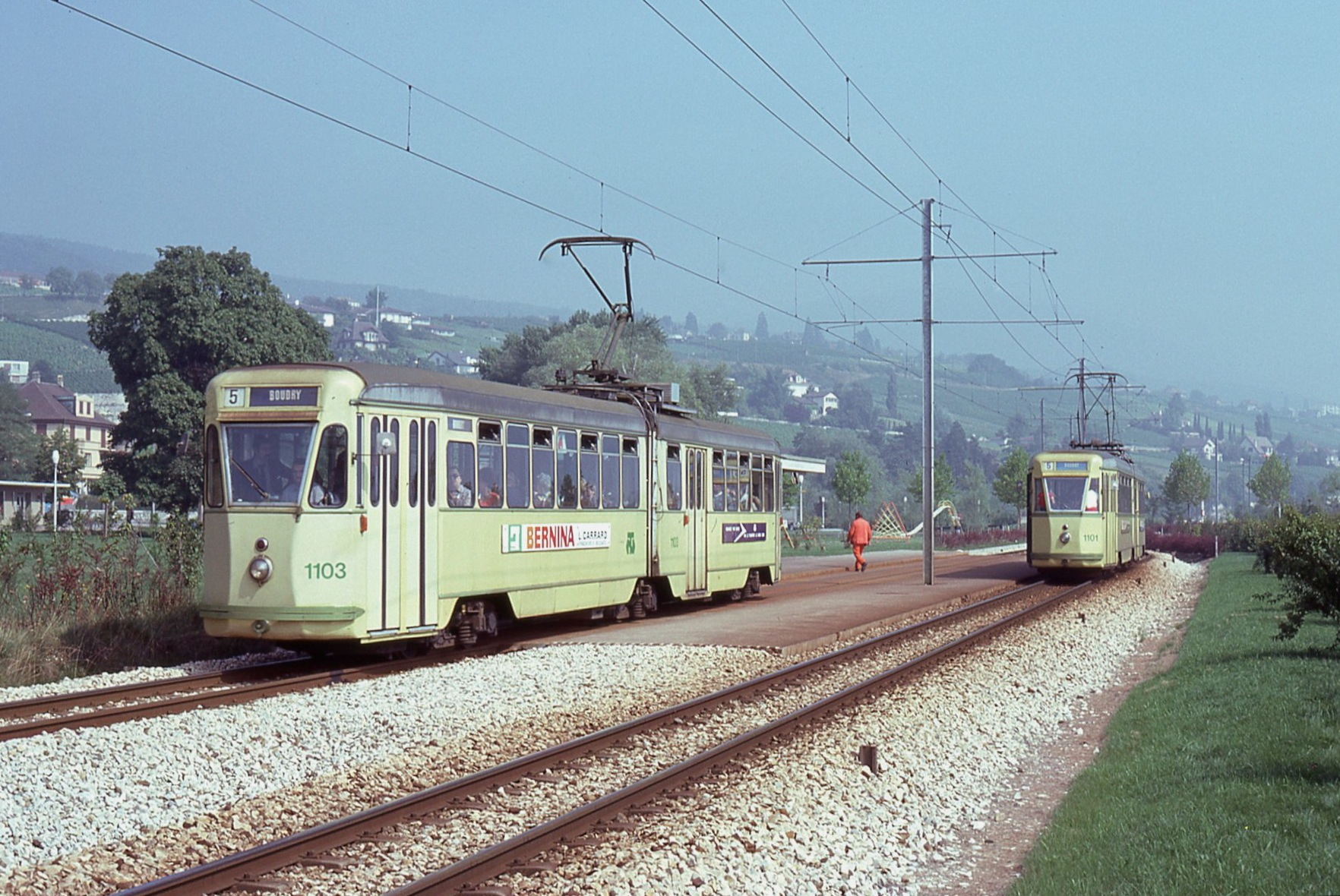
Two ex-Genoa articulated trams passing on route 5

The interurban line to Boudry always had a separate fleet from the urban fleet, but one small group of trams began service on the urban system and later moved to the interurban line after closure of the last urban line (3). These were cars 81–83, Swiss Standard trams built in 1947 by Schweizerische Industrie Gesellschaft (SIG) and purchased new by TN. These four-axle cars were the only double-ended (bi-directional) Swiss Standard trams ever built. They were originally purchased for use on line 1, but were later used on line 3.

All other trams used on the urban lines were two-axle cars and trailers, most commonly operated in sets of one powered tram and one trailer. They were built between 1892 and 1931. The last two-axle cars were retired from service when line 3 closed, in 1976. Four-axle cars 81–83 of 1947 remained in service, running on line 5. They were renumbered 581–583 in 1980.

For the interurban line, the original fleet consisted of five steam locomotives, nos. 1–3 built in 1892 and 4–5 built in 1895 and 1898. They hauled passenger trailers of two or four axles. Locomotives 2, 3 and 5 remained in the fleet until 1903. For the introduction of electric tram service on line 5 in 1902, TN acquired seven double-ended, double-truck (four-axle) tramcars and four matching trailers. All were built in 1902 by SWS, the motored cars being numbered 41–47 and the trailers 51–54; the latter were renumbered 121–124 in 1911. The 1902 cars remained in service for almost 80 years. In 1967–68, they were joined by four articulated trams acquired secondhand from Genoa, Italy. Built in 1942 by Breda, these had carried numbers 1101–1104 in the Genoa tram system's fleet, and they kept the same numbers in Neuchâtel until 1980. They were the only articulated trams ever included in the fleet, and were used exclusively on line 5.

Except for the soon-to-be-retired 1902 cars, the tram fleet was renumbered into the 500 series in 1980. The ex-Genoa Breda cars 1101–1104 became numbers 591–594. After the arrival of the new cars in 1981, Swiss Standard cars 581–583 were relegated to evening service, as were the ex-Genoa cars on the main line to Boudry. However, the latter were in all-day service on the Cortaillod branch, which became operated as a shuttle service to/from Areuse only (on the main Neuchâtel–Boudry line), needing only one car at a time. After closure of the Cortaillod branch in 1984, the ex-Genoa articulated cars and the Swiss Standard cars were seldom needed for service, but remained available. They were withdrawn permanently after TN acquired two additional new cars in 1988.

Until 2019, the Neuchâtel tramway was run exclusively by a high-floor tram fleet, mostly built in 1981, comprising six four-axle power cars of type Be 4/4 with the numbers 501–506 and four corresponding, externally identical control cars (Bt) with the numbers 551–554. These two vehicle types were derived from the Tram 2000 vehicles of the Forchbahn. All were built by SWS in 1981, except the last two powered cars, 505–506, which were built in 1988 and had bodies built by Schindler Waggon (DE) (to the same style as cars 501–504) and trucks by SIG. The eight 1981 cars entered service on 29 June 1981, replacing all of the surviving 1902 cars, which were permanently withdrawn at that time.

=== Current fleet ===
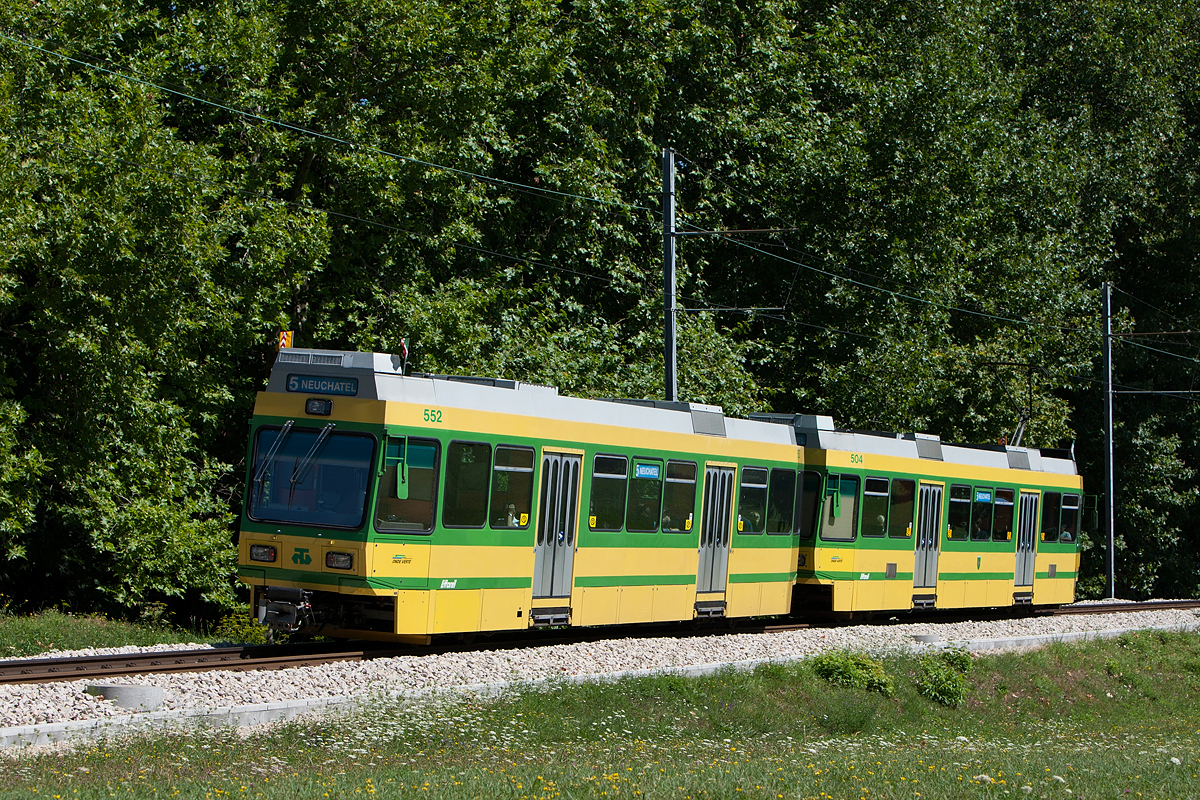
Control trailer 552 and motor tram 504 in service in 2010

Since 2019, the service is run by low-floor vehicles. TransN purchased five Be 4/8s from Appenzeller Bahnen, which had previously been in service on the St. Gallen-Trogen railway line.

=== Preserved cars ===
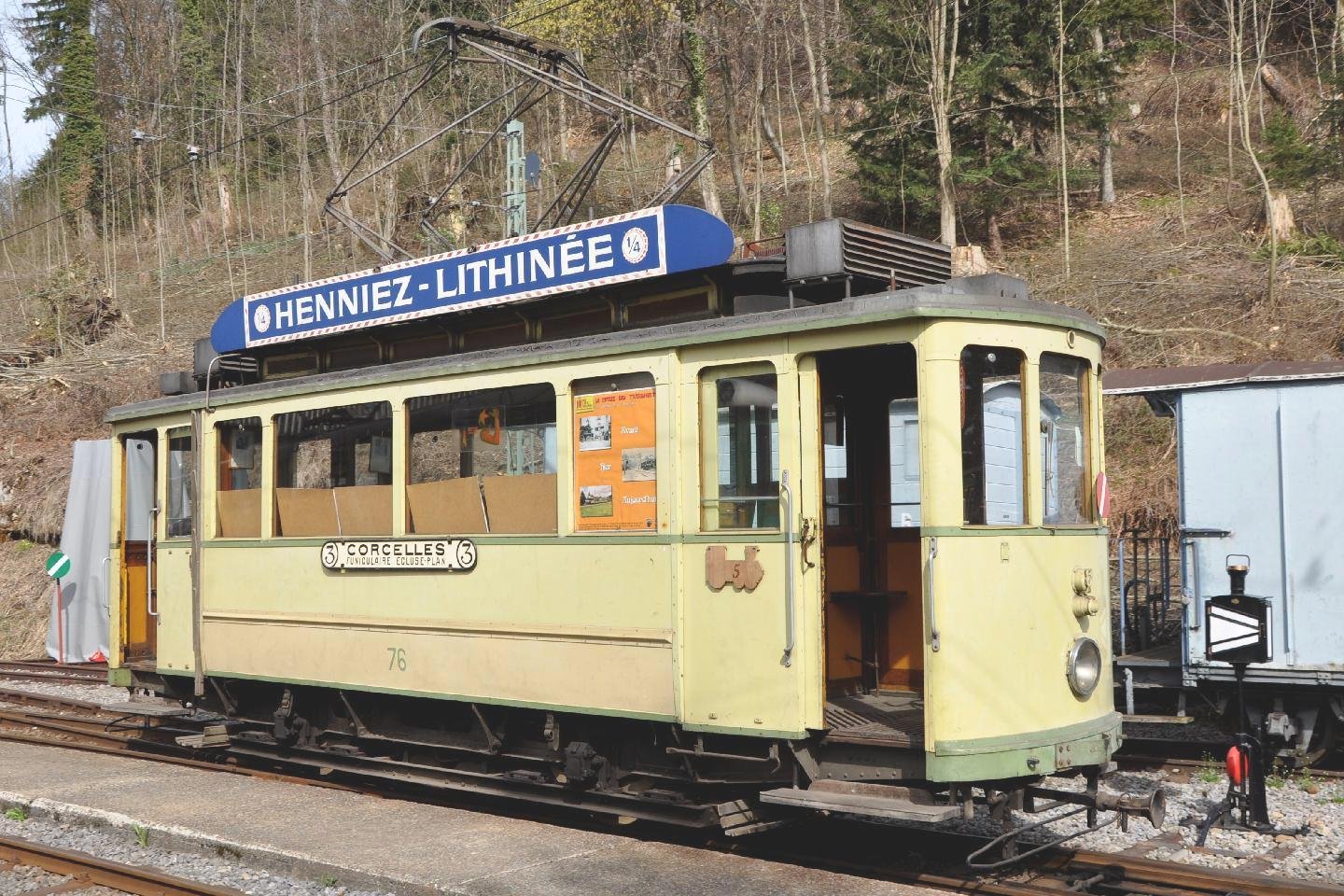
The former Neuchâtel heritage tram Ce 2/2 No. 76, on the Blonay–Chamby Museum Railway, 2011.

TN has preserved the following cars (as of 2000):

- Two-axle tram 73, built in 1922 by SIG
- Two-axle trailer 143, built in 1897 by SIG, rebuilt in 1914 and 1954
- Two-axle trailer 1, ex-101 (II), ex-105, built in 1894 by SIG

Elsewhere, the Blonay–Chamby museum railway has preserved Neuchâtel cars 76 (two-axle tram, built in 1922 by SIG) and 121 (four-axle trailer, built in 1892 by Maschinenfabrik Burkhard, Basel). A large number of ex-Neuchâtel trams have been preserved in various other collections. These include 1902 four-axle cars 41 and 43–47; 1920s-built two-axle cars 72, 74 and 78; 1947-built Swiss Standard Trams 582–583; and ten trailers dating from 1892 to 1902.

None of the 1942 ex-Genoa articulated trams survives. Car 592, ex-1102, was initially preserved by the Association Neuchâteloise des Amis du Tramway (ANAT), which group also owns some of the aforementioned other trams, but was scrapped in 1993 due to its poor condition. All three others of the class had already been scrapped by 1988.

== See also ==
- List of town tramway systems in Switzerland
- Trolleybuses in Neuchâtel
