= Les Eplatures Airport =

Les Éplatures Airport
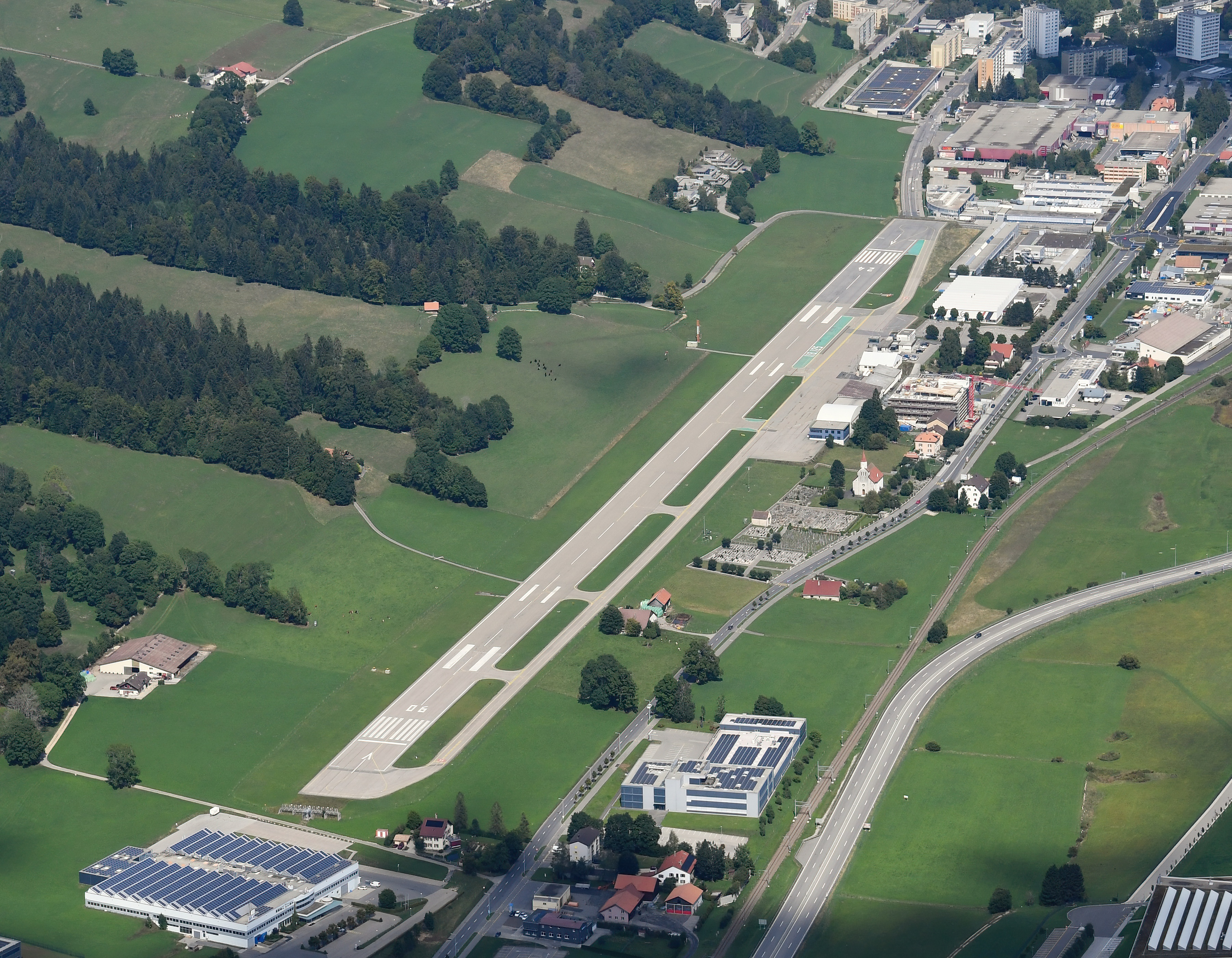
- IATA: none; ICAO: LSGC

Summary
- Airport type: Public
- Location: La Chaux-de-Fonds, Switzerland
- Elevation AMSL: 3,366 ft (1,026 m)
- Coordinates: 47°05′02″N 006°47′34″E
- Website: leseplaturesairport.ch
- Interactive map of Les Éplatures Airport

Runways
Direction	Length		Surface
Direction	m	ft	Surface
05/23	1,130	3,707	Asphalt
- Source: DAFIF

Les Éplatures Airport (French: Aéroport Les Éplatures, German: Flugplatz Les Éplatures, Italian: Aeroporto Les Éplatures) (ICAO: LSGC) is a small international airport near La Chaux-de-Fonds, Switzerland. The airport primarily caters to executive and recreational flying, with some air taxi and charter service.

== History ==
The first plane landed at the field in 1912, but the airport concession was not obtained until 1955. At the end of World War II, Swiss authorities identified existing locations that were to be modernized as regional airports, a second tier of infrastructure to support the primary urban airports, with Les Eplatures being one of the five.

== Facilities ==
The airport resides at an elevation of 3,368 feet (1,027 m) above mean sea level. It has one runway designated 05/23 with an asphalt surface measuring 1,130 by 27 metres (3,707 ft × 89 ft).

== Airlines and destinations ==
As per April 2026, no airline operates scheduled or charter services.
