= List of hotels: Countries S =

This is a list of what are intended to be the notable top hotels by country, five or four star hotels, notable skyscraper landmarks or historic hotels which are covered in multiple reliable publications. It should not be a directory of every hotel in every country:

== Saint-Barthélemy ==
- Cheval Blanc, St Barths
- Eden Rock, St Barths
- Hotel Le Toiny

== Saint Lucia ==
- Anse Chastanet

== Saint Martin ==
- Belmond La Samanna

== Saudi Arabia ==
- Makkah Clock Royal Tower Hotel, Mecca

== Slovenia ==
- Grand Hotel Union, Ljubljana
- Kempinski Palace Hotel
- Mokrice Castle, Jesenice, Brežice
- Otočec Castle, Otočec
- Podsmreka Castle, Podsmreka pri Višnji Gori
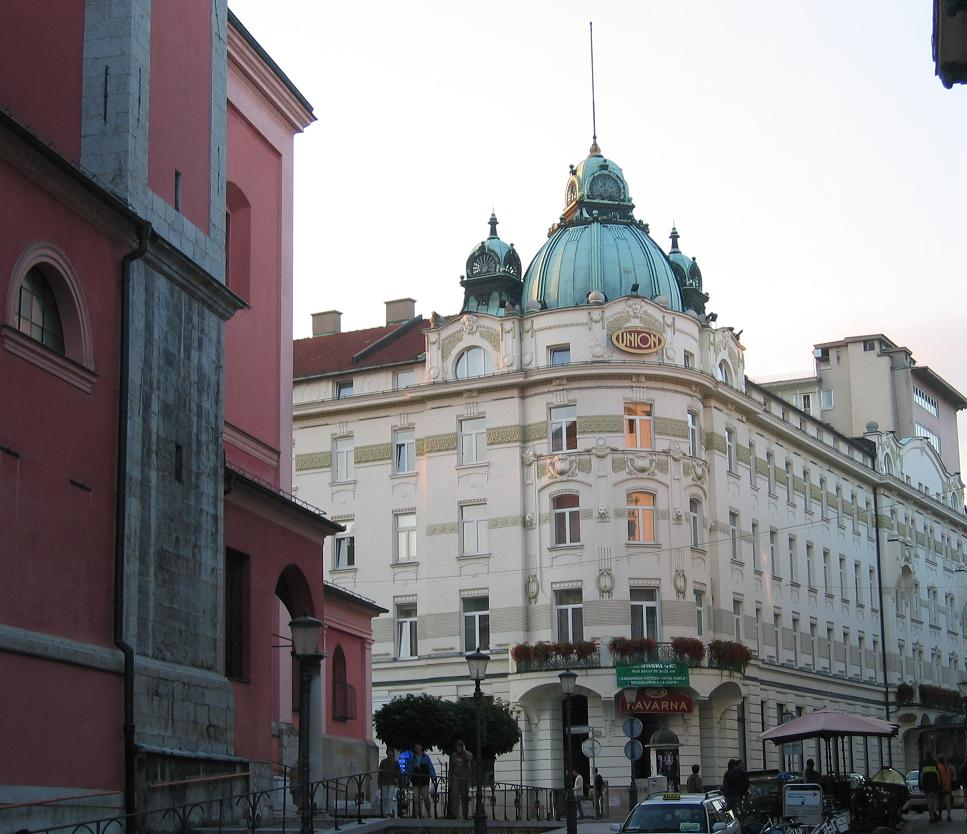
Grand Hotel Union

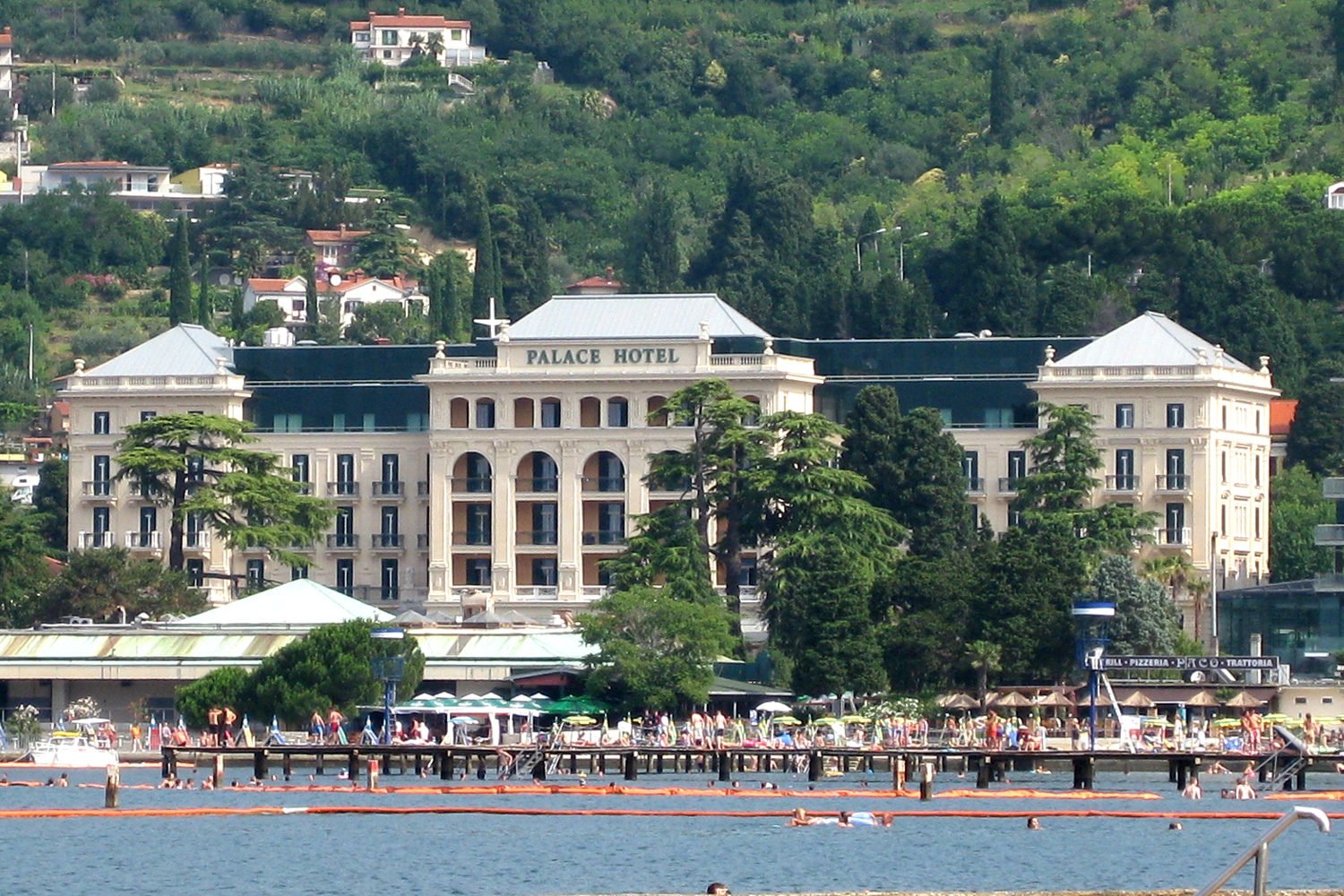
Kempinski Palace Hotel (Portorož)

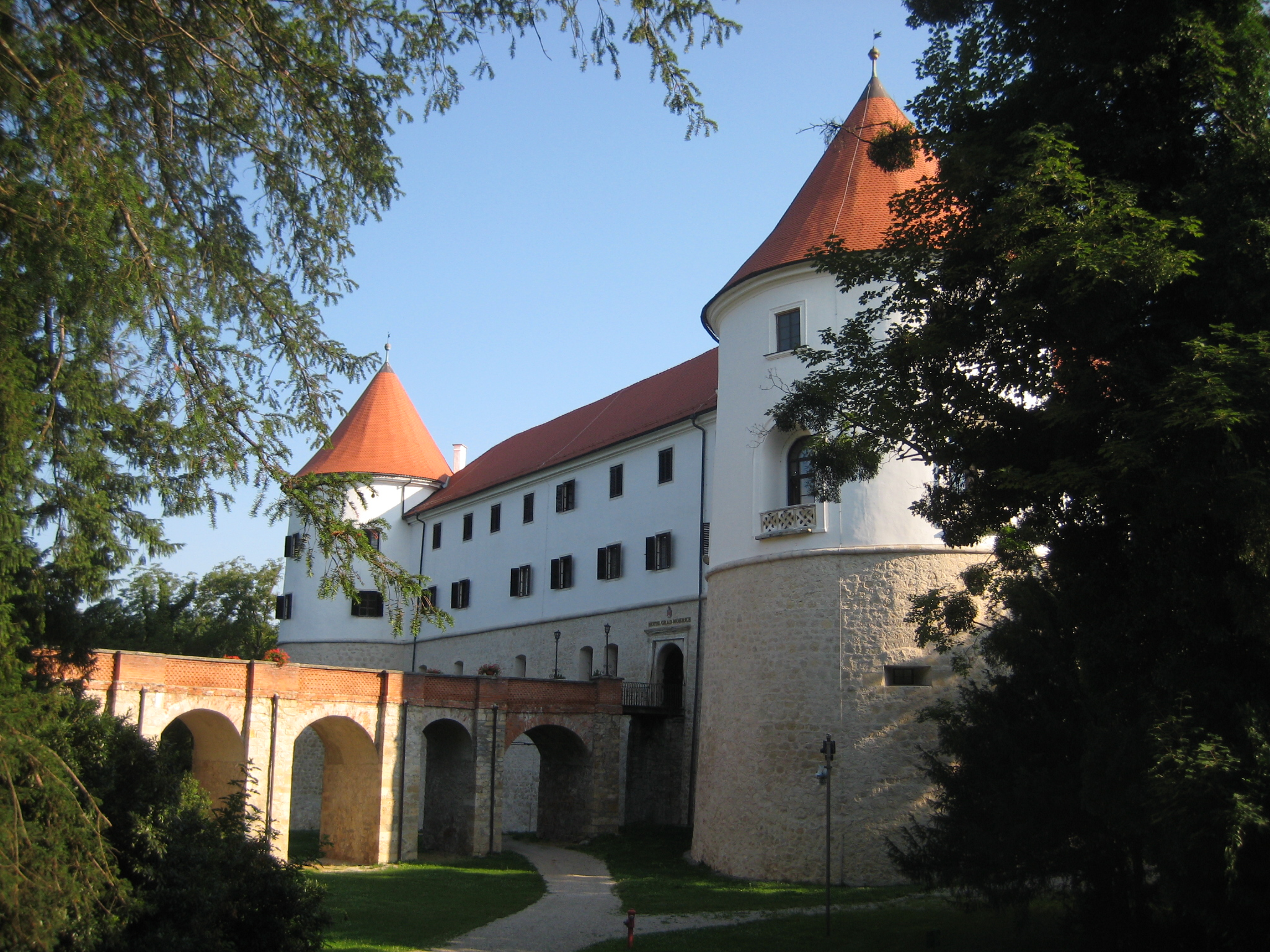
Mokrice Castle

== Somalia ==
- Muna Hotel, Mogadishu

== South Korea ==
- Design and Arts Arcadia of Myungseung
- Grand Hyatt Seoul
- Koreana Hotel, Seoul
- Lotte Hotel Busan
- Sheraton Incheon Hotel

== Sudan ==
- Acropole Hotel, Khartoum
- Meridien Hotel, Khartoum

== Swaziland ==
- Royal Swazi Sun Hotel, Ezulwini valley
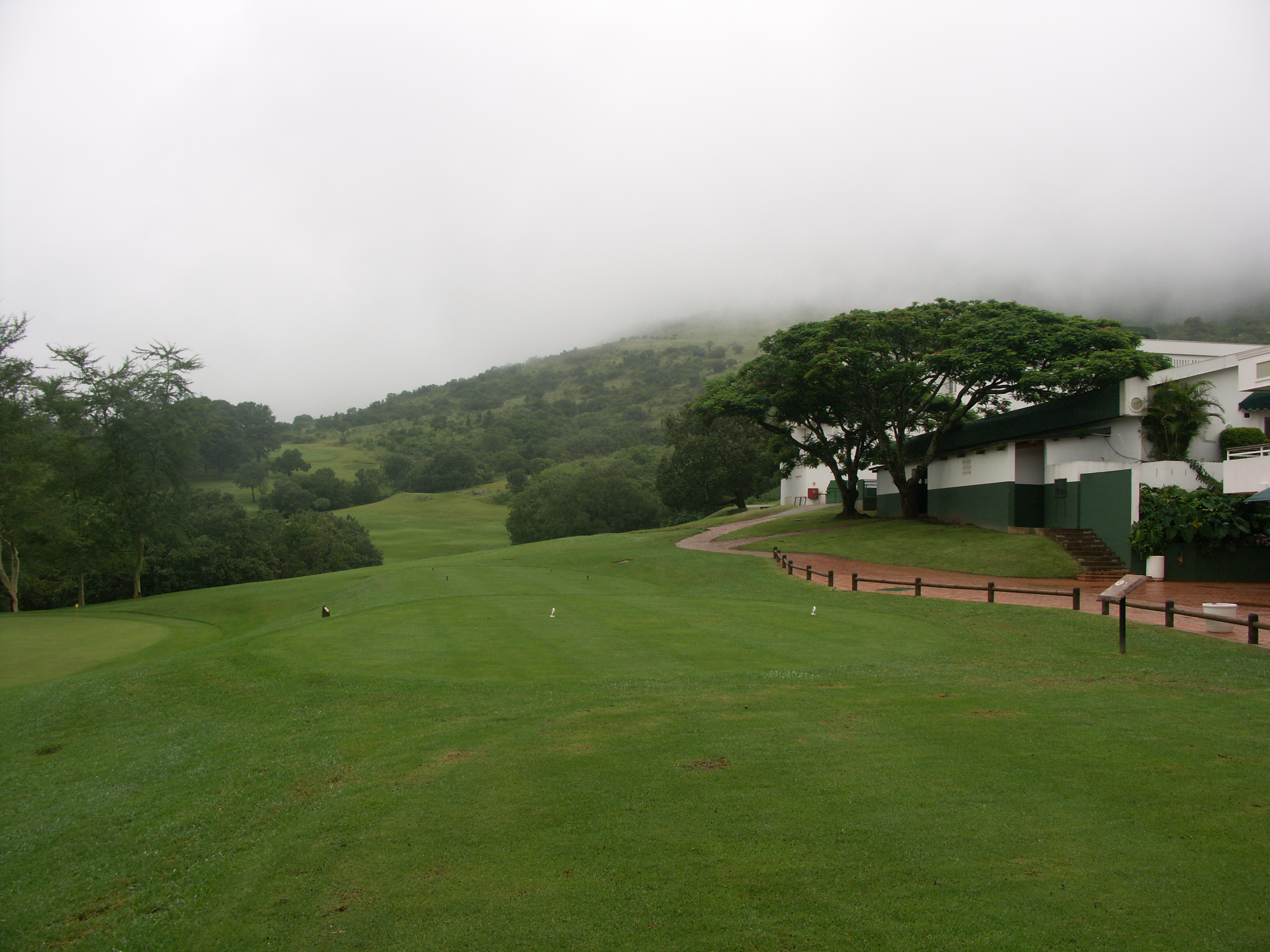
Royal Swazi Sun Hotel

== Sweden ==
=== Gothenburg ===
- Clarion Hotel Post
- Hotel Gothia Towers

=== Stockholm ===
- Clas på Hörnet
- Grand Hotel Saltsjöbaden
- Grand Hôtel, Stockholm
- Hotel Rival
- Lady Hutton
- Rica Talk Hotel
- Scandic Hotel Ariadne
- Victoria Tower

=== Elsewhere ===
- Copperhill Mountain Lodge
- Fabriken Furillen

== Switzerland ==
- Badrutt's Palace Hotel, St Moritz
- Baur au Lac, Zurich
- Beau-Rivage, Geneva
- Beau-Rivage Palace, Lausanne
- Berghotel Maderanertal, Silenen
- Berghotel Schatzalp, Davos
- Château Gütsch, Lucerne
- Grand Hotel Dolder, Zurich
- Grand Hotel Kronenhof, Pontresina
- Gstaad Palace, Gstaad
- Hotel Bellevue des Alpes, Kleine Scheidegg
- Hotel Bellevue Palace, Bern
- Hotel des Trois Couronnes, Vevey
- Hotel Les Trois Rois, Basel
- Hotel Paxmontana, Sachseln
- Hotel Storchen, Zurich
- Hotel Widder, Zurich
- Helmhaus, Zurich
- Kindli, Zurich
- Kulm Hotel St. Moritz
- Kurhaus Bergün, Bergün
- Mandarin Oriental Savoy, Zurich
- Monte Rosa Hotel, Zermatt
- Null Stern Hotel, Teufen
- Posthotel Rössli, Gstaad
- Rigi Kulm Hotel
- Sporthotel Pontresina
- Suvretta House, St Moritz
- Swissôtel Zurich
- Teufelhof Basel
- Therme Vals, Graubünden
- Waldhaus Flims, Flims
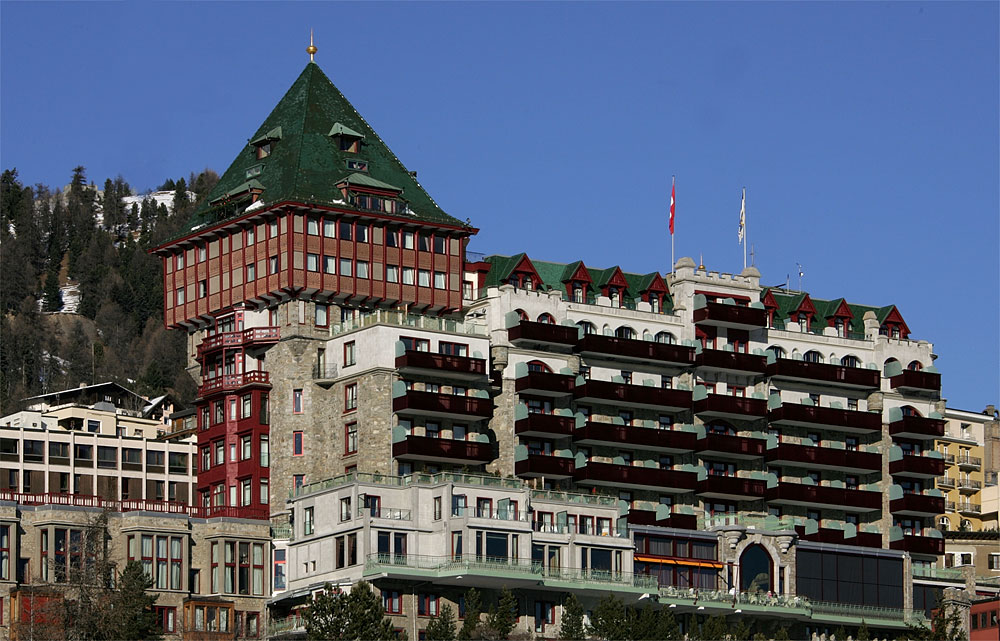
Badrutt's Palace Hotel

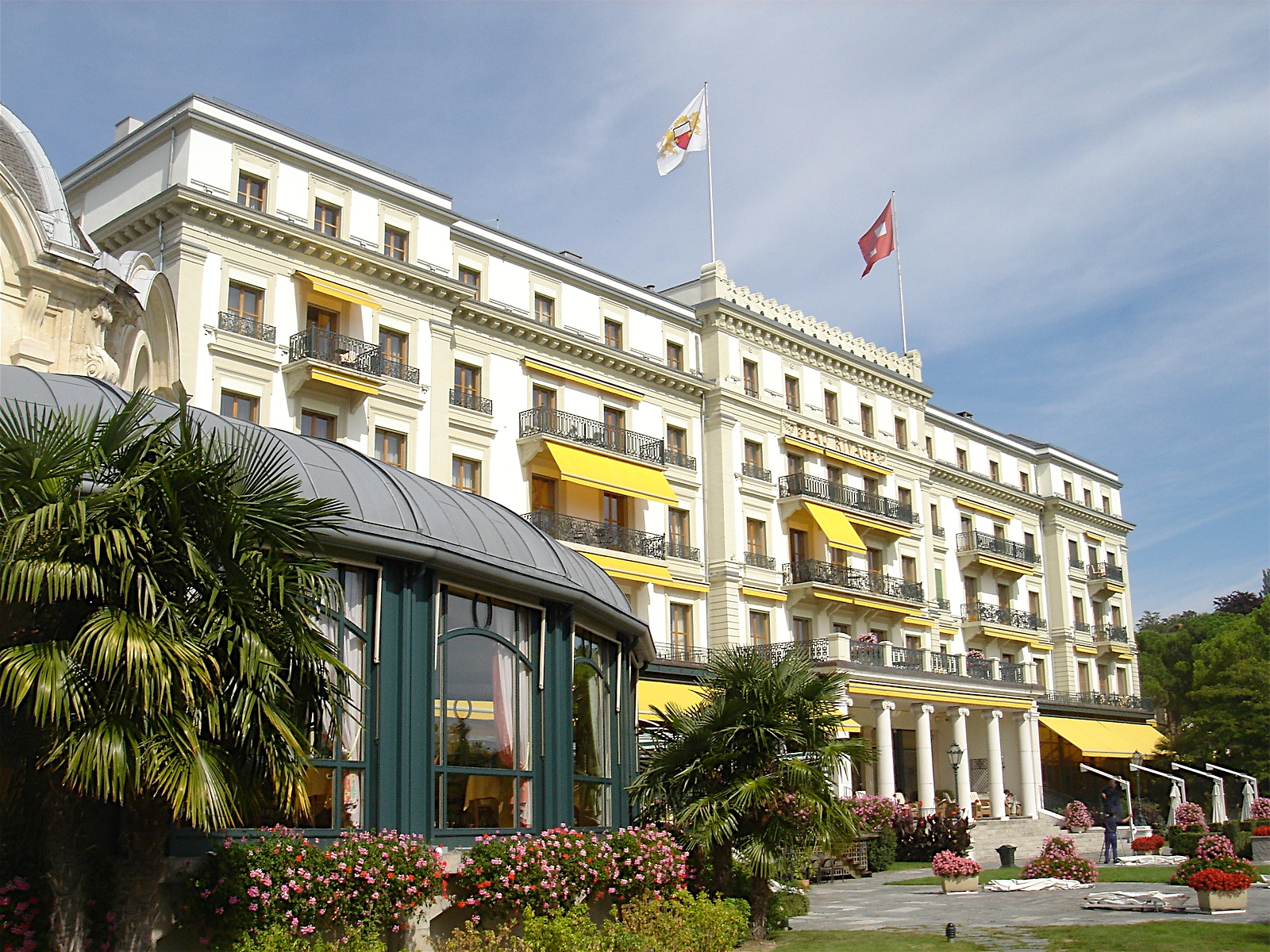
Beau-Rivage Palace

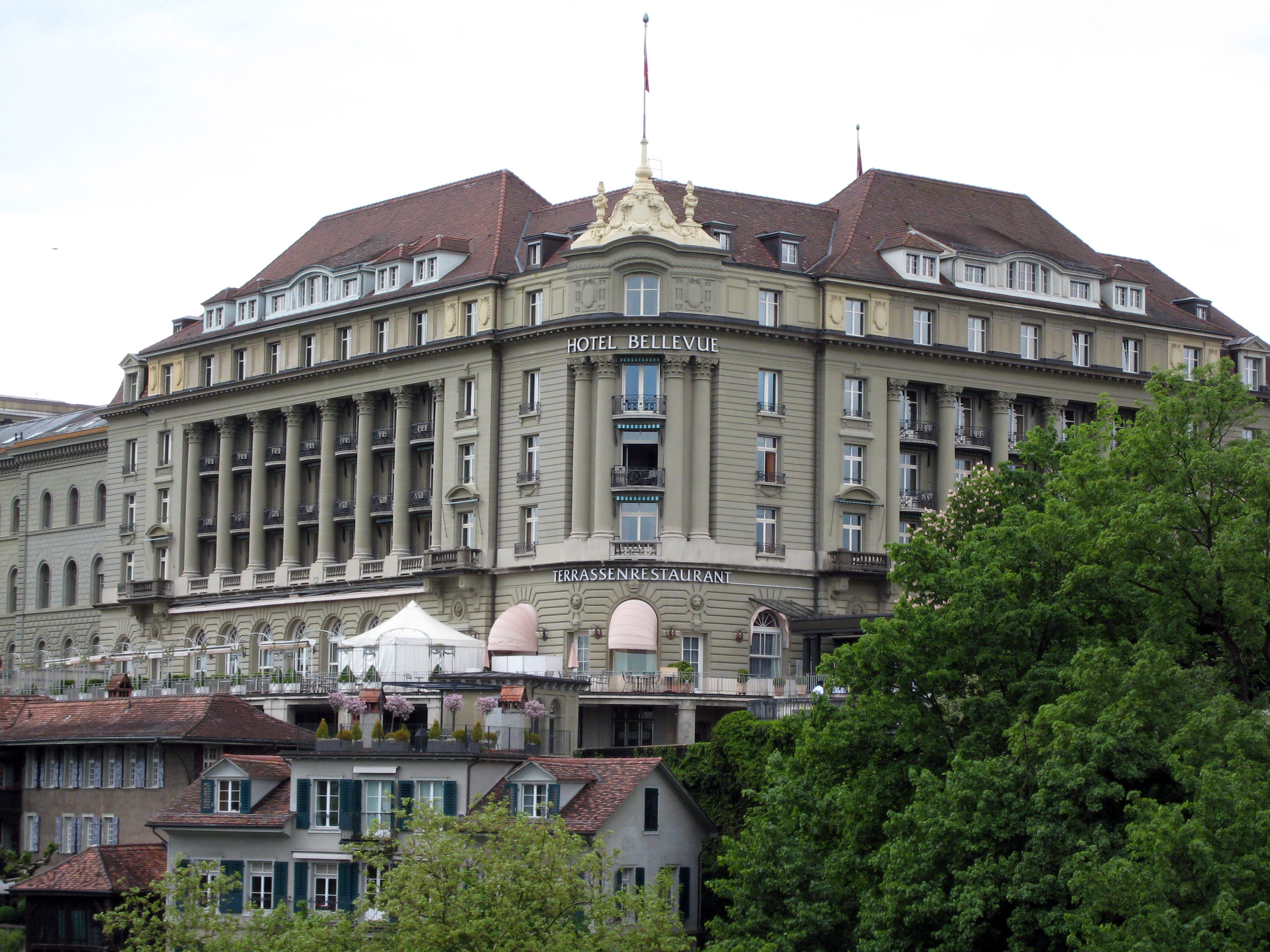
Hotel Bellevue Palace

Grand Hotel Dolder

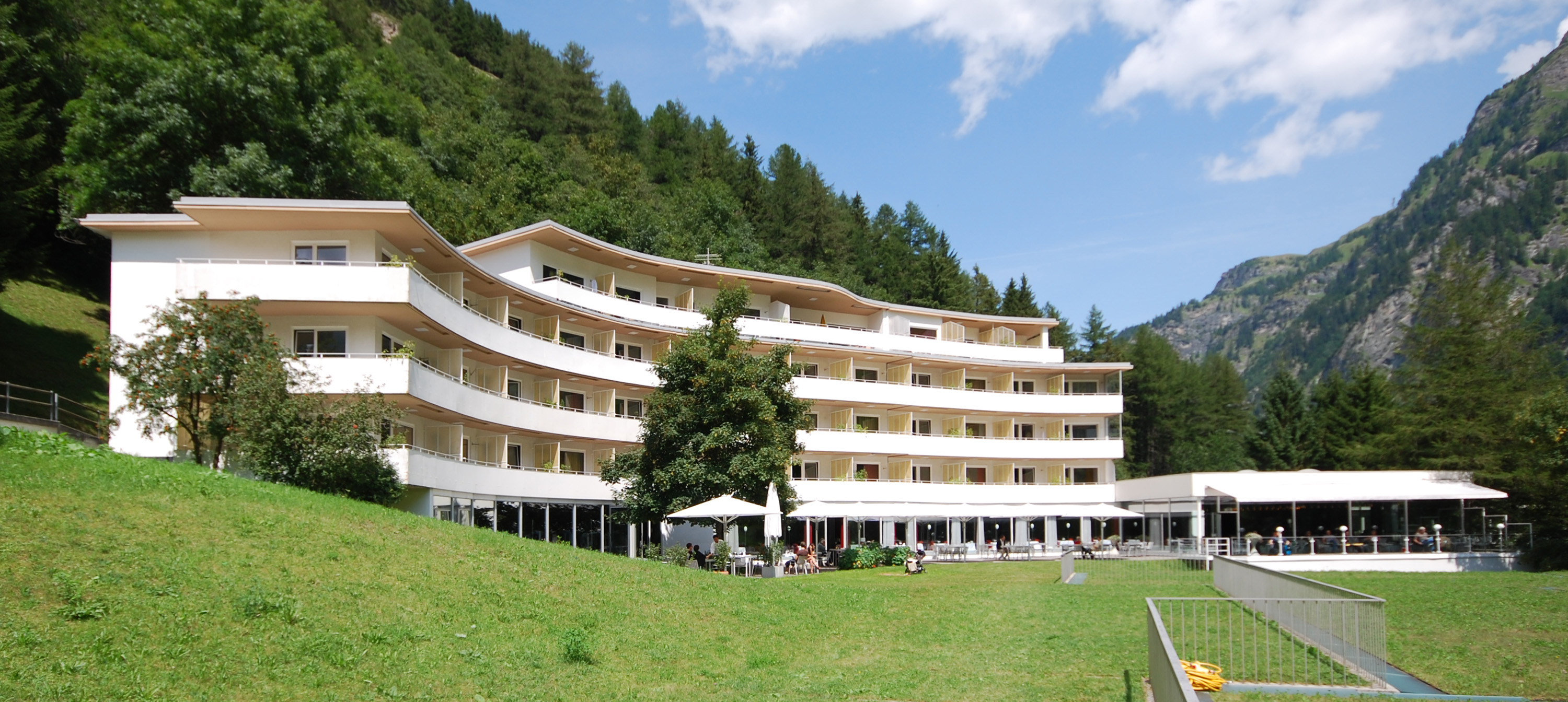
Therme Vals

== Syria ==
- Baron Hotel, Aleppo
- Beit al-Mamlouka Hotel, Damascus
- Blue Tower Hotel, Damascus
- Four Seasons Hotel Damascus, Damascus
- Sheraton Aleppo Hotel, Aleppo
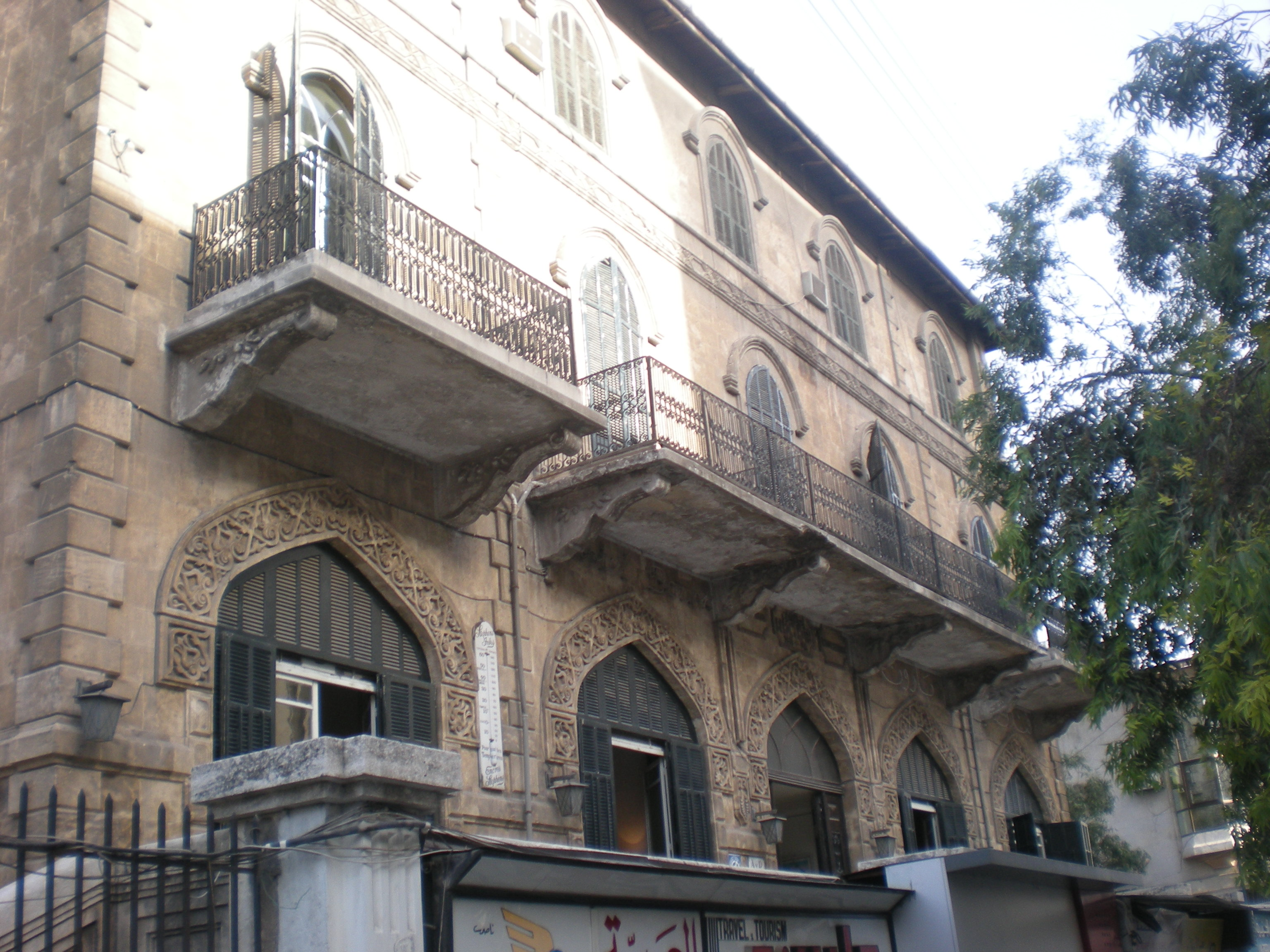
Baron Hotel

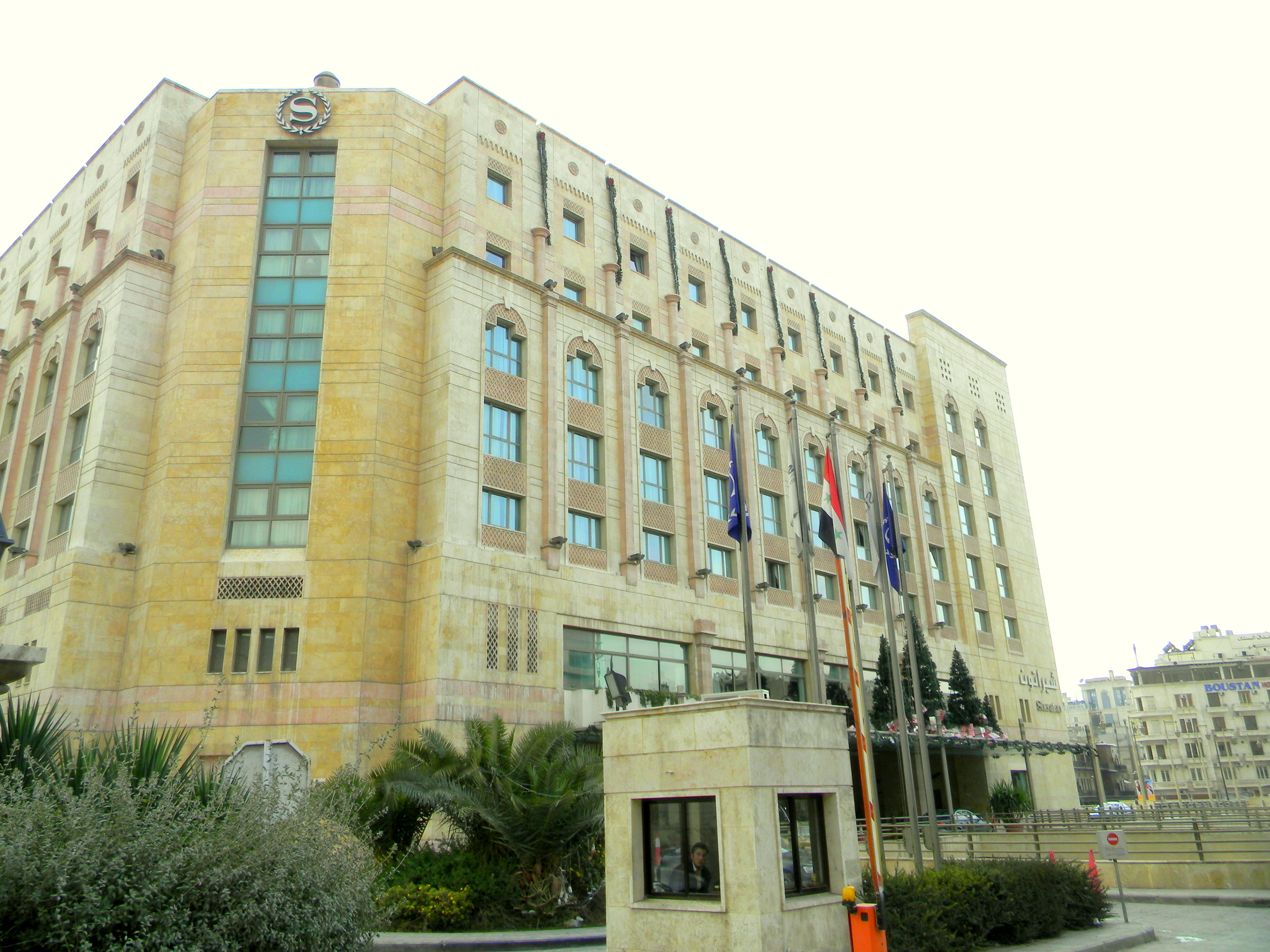
Sheraton Aleppo Hotel

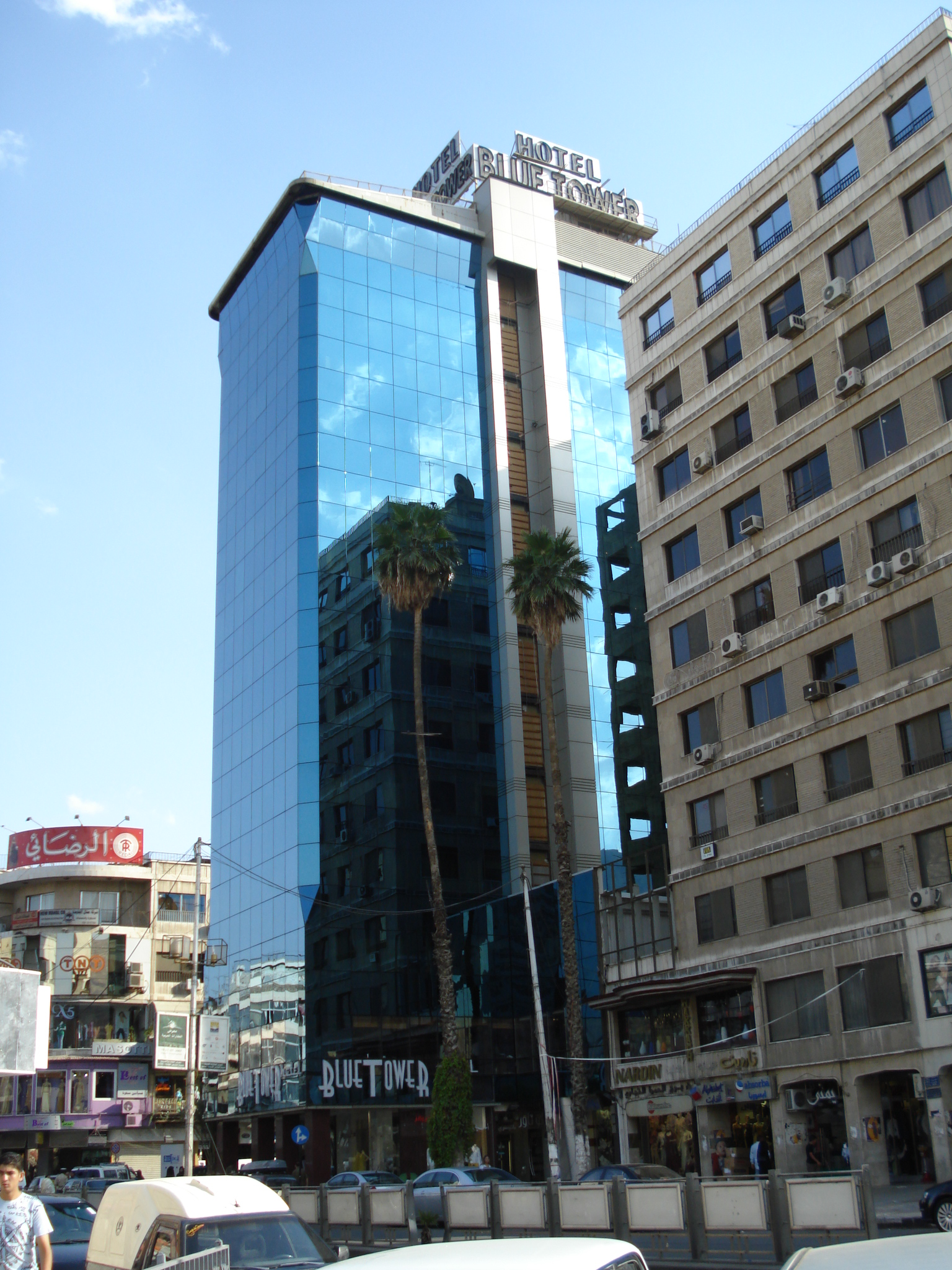
Blue Tower Hotel

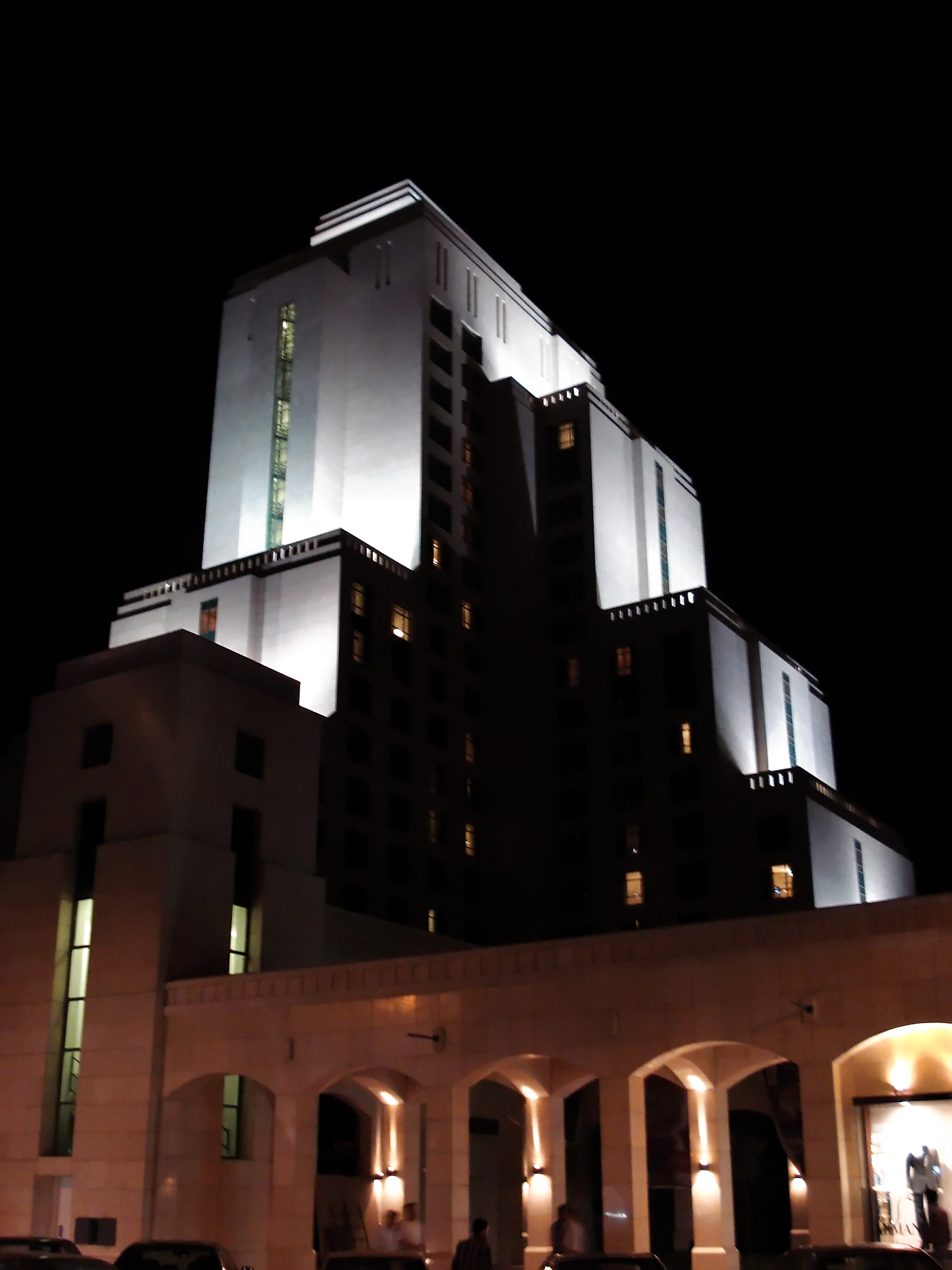
Four Seasons Hotel Damascus
