= Lillian von Kauffmann =

Danish businesswoman

Lillian von Kauffmann (née Salomonsen; 1920–2016) was a successful Danish businesswoman and property owner. She became outstandingly rich thanks to the shares in De Danske Cichoriefabriker she inherited from her father and her acquisition of the companies her sister had managed until her early death. Married three times, her third husband Ernst von Kauffmann supported her business interests until his death in 1974. She is remembered for her sometime ownership of the Basnæs Estate and of Copenhagen's Palace Hotel. Von Kauffmann later bought luxury hotels in Vevey, Switzerland, where she died in the Hotel des Trois Couronnes in December 2016.

== Biography ==
Born in Nice, France, on 18 December 1920, Elly Lillian Carl Salomonsen was the daughter of the businessman Carl Harry Otto Salomonsen (1876–1942) and his wife Paula Frederikke née Weimann. She married three times, first in December 1942 with the stockbroker Helge Bendix until 1948 when the marriage was dissolved, second in June 1948 with the engineer and business executive Sigurd Gjerdsøe who died in a traffic accident in 1949, and third in July 1950 with the bank director Ernst von Kauffmann (1887–1974).

When her father died in 1942, Lillian von Kauffmann and her sister Erna inherited her father's business interests as well as the Basnæs Estate. When Erna died in a traffic accident in 1952, Lillian acquired ownership. The estate had been a favourite of Hans Christian Andersen who visited it some 37 times, After her sister's death, she also acquired ownership of companies including Det Danske Mælke-Compagni, Dansk Delikatesse Kompagni (Dadeko) and the property company Gorm.

In July 1950, she married Ernst von Kauffmann who left his post as director of Kjøbenhavns Handelsbank in order to help his wife manage her business interests. In 1964, Lillian von Kauffmann bought the Palace Hotel in Copenhagen, where she lived for a period with her 13 children. She ran the city's leading dance restaurant, the Ambassadeur, which closed in 1974. Her husband died in 1975.

In 1977, she sold Dadeko and in 1979, the Palace Hotel. She moved to Vevey in Switzerland where she bought two luxury hotels. She died there in the Hotel des Trois Couronnes on 12 December 2016.

== Personal life ==
Lillian von Kauffmann had 13 children, two with Ceprilli Gamél, one with Sigurd Gjersøe and 10 with Ernst von Kauffmann who also brought one child of his own into the family.
