= Kindli (hotel) =

Historic building and former inn in Zurich, Switzerland

- Haus zum Kindli
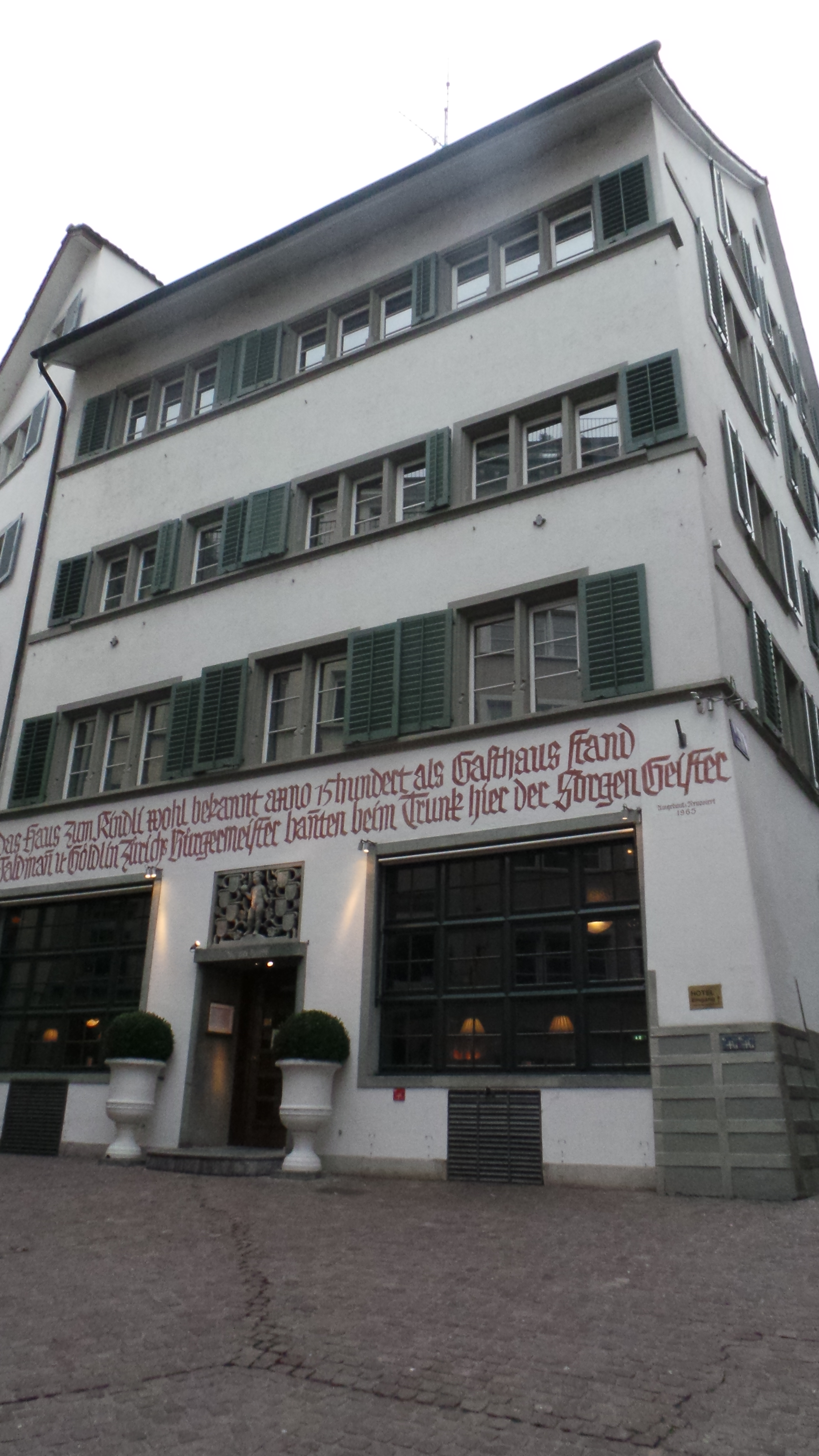
- Haus zum Kindli in Zurich

- Location within Canton of Zurich Location within Switzerland

General information
- Location: Pfalzgasse 1; Old Town, Zurich
- Coordinates: 47°22′20.5″N 8°32′26″E
- Opening: before 1409 (as inn)

Other information
- Number of rooms: 20
- Parking: Nearby street parking

Website
- www.kindli.ch

Kindli (Haus zum Kindli) is a historic building and inn located at Pfalzgasse 1 and Strehlgasse 24 in the Old Town of Zurich, Switzerland, in the Lindenhof quarter near Bahnhofstrasse. It is among the oldest documented houses in Zurich associated with hospitality and has been attested in historical sources since the late Middle Ages. The building is listed as a protected cultural property.

== History ==
The house known as the Kindli is first mentioned by name in 1409, when the innkeeper Heinrich Hagnauer is recorded serving wine in the house ze dem Kind. According to the Zurich pastor and historian Salomon Vögelin, a drinking room may have existed on this site as early as 1357.

During the second half of the 15th century, the building was expanded into a hostelry accommodating affluent travellers and pilgrims. One of the earliest surviving descriptions of a stay at the Kindli comes from the travel account of the Saxon patrician, salt merchant and pilgrim Hans von Waltheym, who lodged there during a pilgrimage at Pentecost in 1474. At the time, the innkeeper was Albrecht Moser, a respected Zurich citizen and former administrator of the Commandery of Bubikon of the Order of St John. Hans von Waltheym’s account is regarded as one of the earliest known descriptions of a Zurich inn and as the earliest printed travel report referring to the city.

During the late 15th and early 16th centuries, the Kindli under innkeeper Albrecht Moser exemplified a form of commercially oriented hospitality aimed at affluent travellers. In the context of the Renaissance and early capitalism, increased long-distance travel by merchants, patricians, and pilgrims led to growing expectations for professionally managed inns offering prepared meals and secure storage for valuables. Establishments such as the Kindli catered to these demands and contributed to the development of urban hospitality infrastructure in Zurich.

After several changes of ownership, the building passed in 1618 to David Werdmüller, a son of the textile entrepreneur David Werdmüller. He converted the former inn into a private residence. The house remained largely in private use for approximately 250 years. During the 18th century, the polymath and Zurich mayor Johann Caspar Escher resided in the Kindli. In 1876, Emilie Tribelhorn reinstated the tavern rights of the house and reopened it as a restaurant. She was the mother of the Swiss electric vehicle pioneer Johann Albert Tribelhorn. In 1890, the Kindli was acquired by Carl Mayer, founder of the Tiefenbrunnen Brewery in Zurich, who introduced themed gastronomy with medieval elements, including an oversized plaster figure of Emperor Frederick Barbarossa.

In 1918, the establishment was taken over by Jacky Wolf, who established a long-running tradition of high-quality folk music performances. The Schmid siblings were regular performers at the Kindli. In 1928 the exterior façade was redesigned and a two-part inscription in archaic lettering was added. The relief above the entrance, depicting the Christ Child with imperial orb and heraldic shields, was created by the Zurich sculptor Otto Münch. Since 1965, the Kindli has again operated as a hotel.

== Architecture ==
The Kindli is a multi-storey townhouse incorporating architectural elements from the late medieval and early modern periods. Despite multiple renovations, the building retains key features of its historic fabric and contributes to the architectural character of Zurich’s Old Town.

== Present use ==
Today, the Kindli operates as a boutique hotel and restaurant. The restaurant serves traditional European cuisine, including Swiss regional dishes such as Zürcher Geschnetzeltes with Rösti.

== Cultural significance ==
The Kindli is regarded as an important example of Zurich’s historical inns and hostels and reflects the city’s long tradition of hospitality. Due to its documented medieval origins and continuous presence in the urban fabric, it is considered part of Zurich’s cultural heritage.

== See also ==
- List of hotels in Switzerland
