= Posthotel Rössli =

Coordinates: 46.4728°N 7.2866°E

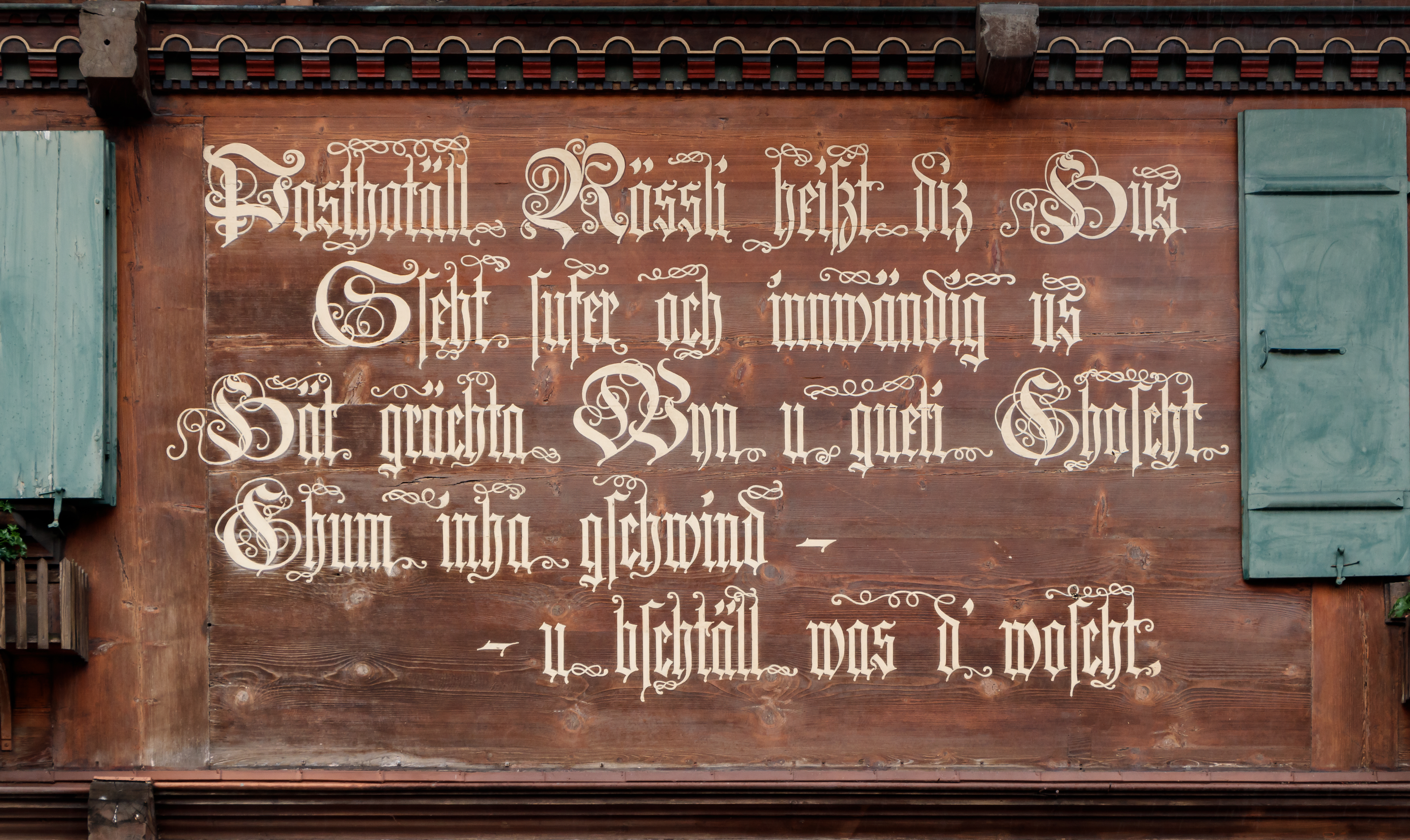
Inscription

Posthotel Rössli is a 3-star-hotel in the middle of Gstaad, Switzerland. It is the oldest hotel in the town.

== History ==
The hotel, built c. 1823 and bought in 1844 by Bendicht Steffen, first opened in 1845 as a guesthouse; it also served as a post office. Since 1922, the Widmer family has owned the hotel, which is now operated by brothers Conroy and Lars Widmer.

== See also ==
- List of hotels in Switzerland
- Tourism in Switzerland
