= Podsmreka Castle =

16th-century mansion in Slovenia

Coordinates: 45°56′59.37″N 14°46′6.18″E

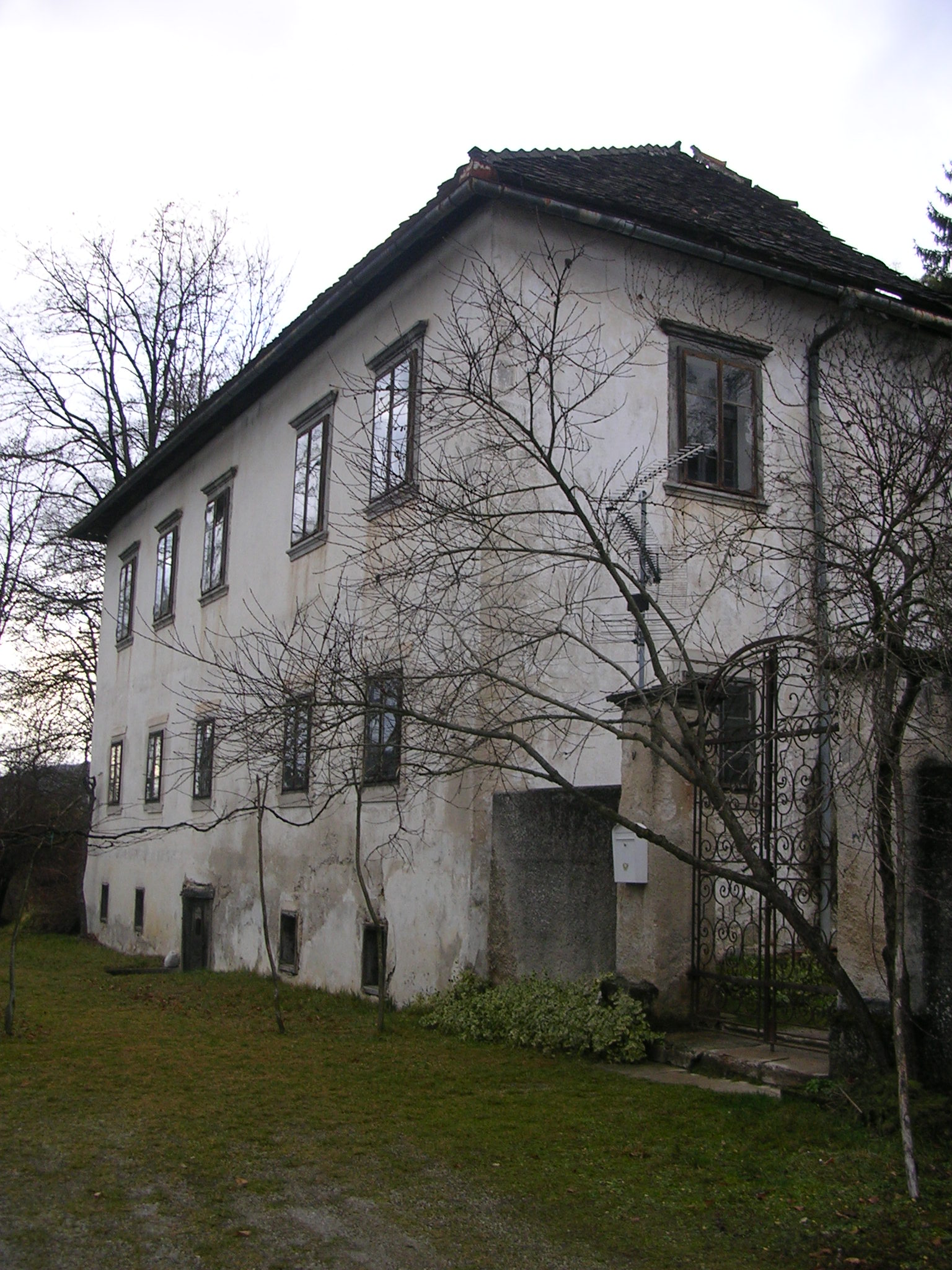
Podsmreka Castle in 2007

Podsmreka Castle (Slovene: grad Podsmreka, German: Burg Smreck) is a 16th-century mansion in the settlement of Podsmreka pri Višnji Gori, in the Municipality of Ivančna Gorica, southeastern Slovenia. The manor's name is a compound of the Slovene words pod and smreka, meaning 'beneath [the] spruce'. The Municipality of Ivančna Gorica had sought to have the mansion restored as a motel.

== History ==
Built by the noble Galli family in the late 16th century, the mansion was rebuilt several times by later owners. In the late 19th century, it was bought by the Ljubljana merchant Fortuna. In 1935, it was purchased by the Viennese nobleman Peter Klarwill (1909–1992), who maintained a library and art collection in it. Karwill, who was of Jewish origin, sold the castle to Anton Verovšek (1917–1947) in 1939 and emigrated to New Zealand.

In 1948, the mansion was sold to the state by Verovšek's impoverished heirs (whose other property and business had been confiscated by the communist regime), and it was converted into a women's prison. Later it housed the pottery collection of the Slovene Ethnographic Museum. In the mid-1970s, a gravel pit was opened near the manor; the museum closed soon thereafter. After that, it served as apartment housing. The Municipality of Ivančna Gorica acquired the property in 2014. It is now in ruins.

== Gallery ==
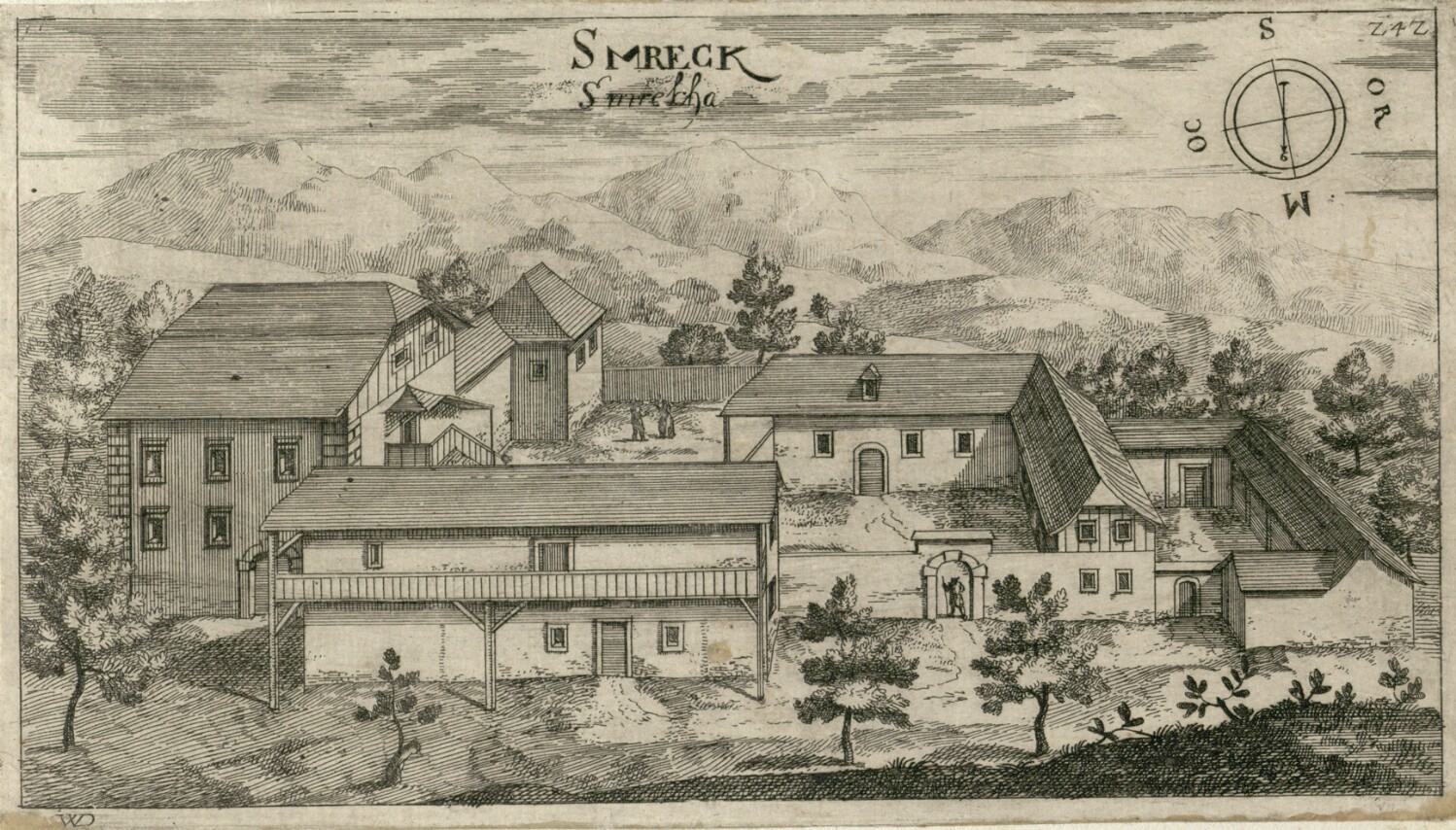
Engraving, 1679

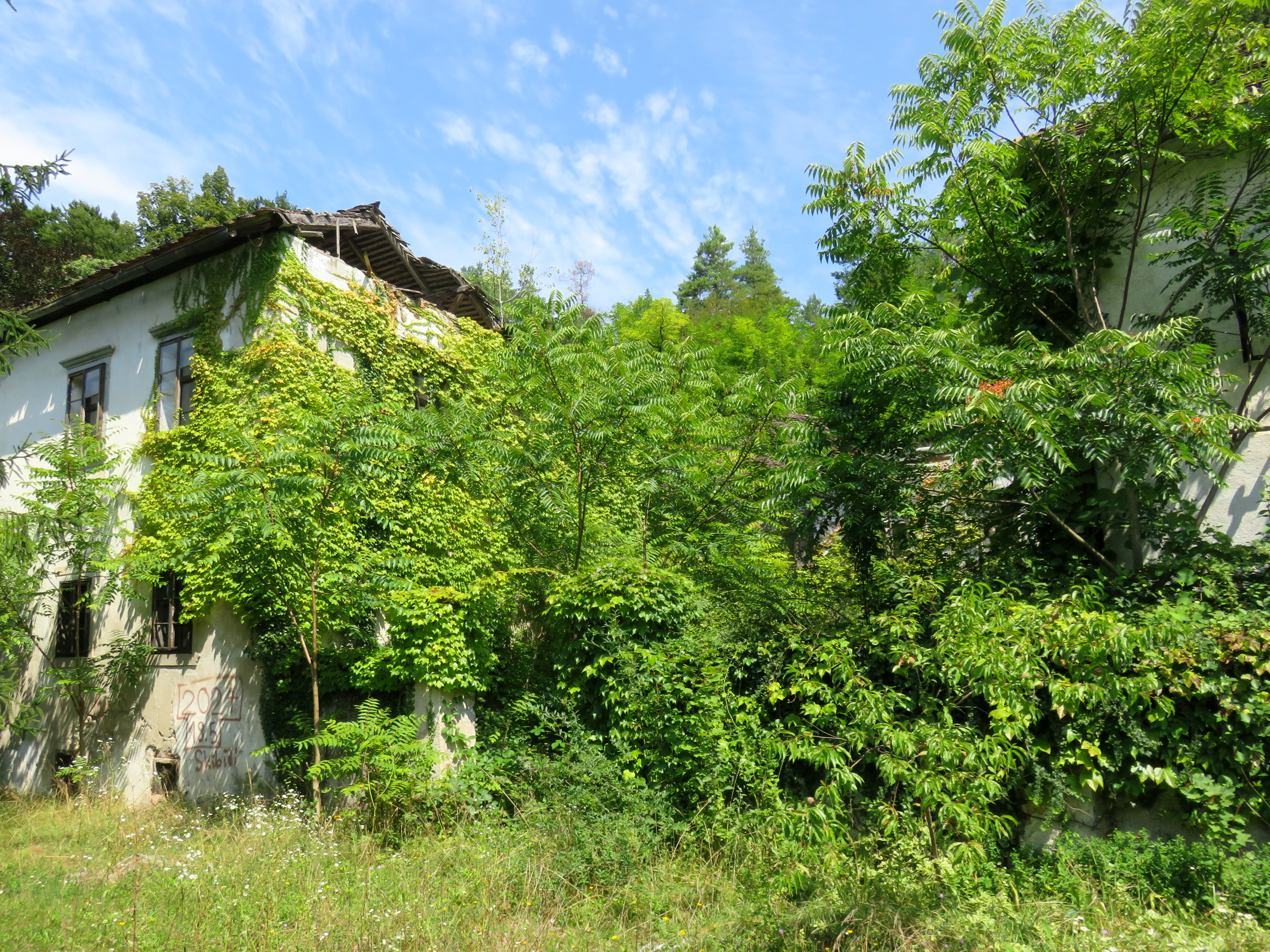
West wing, 2024

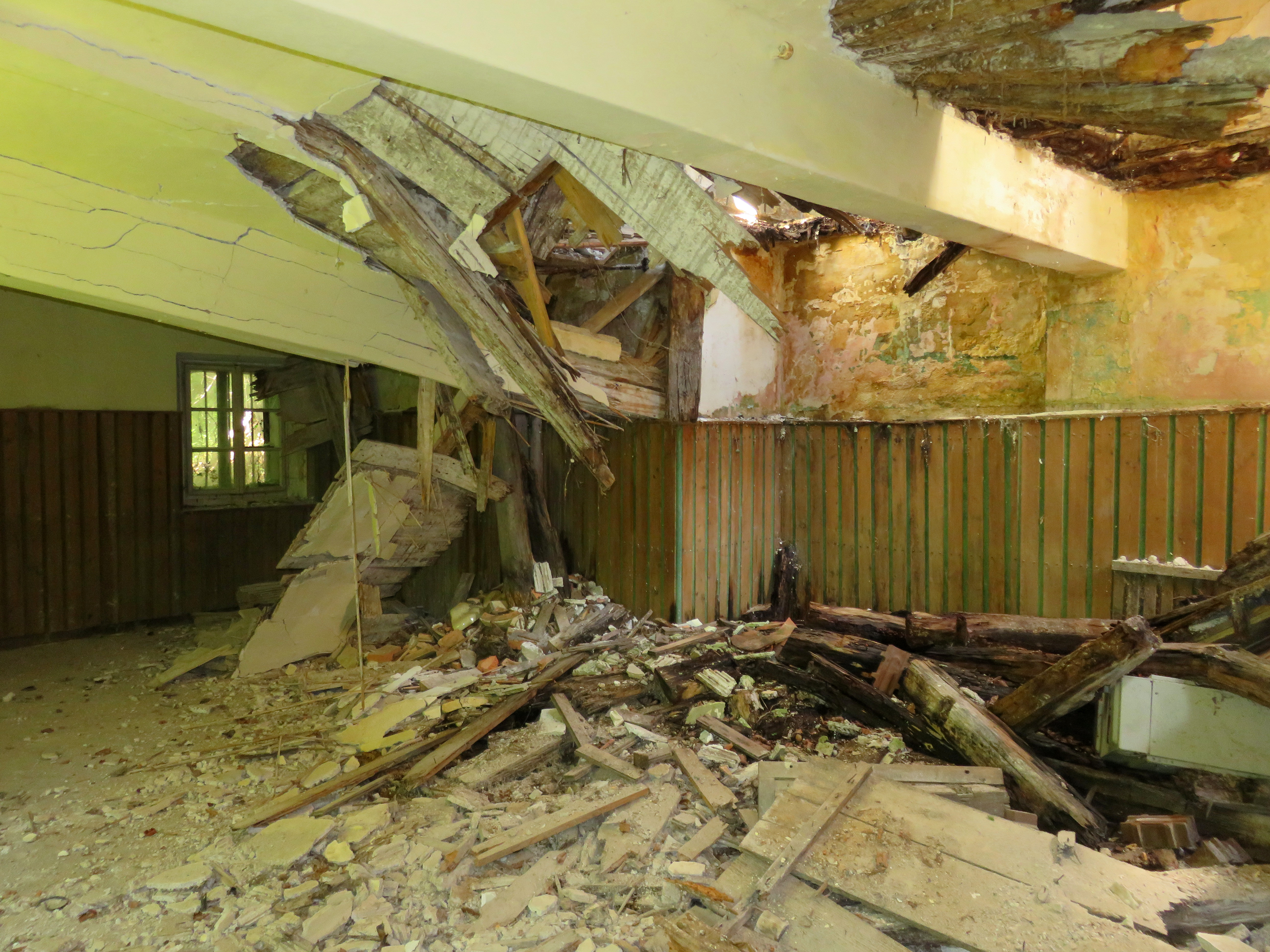
Interior, 2024
