= Beau-Rivage Geneva =

Hotel in Geneva, Switzerland

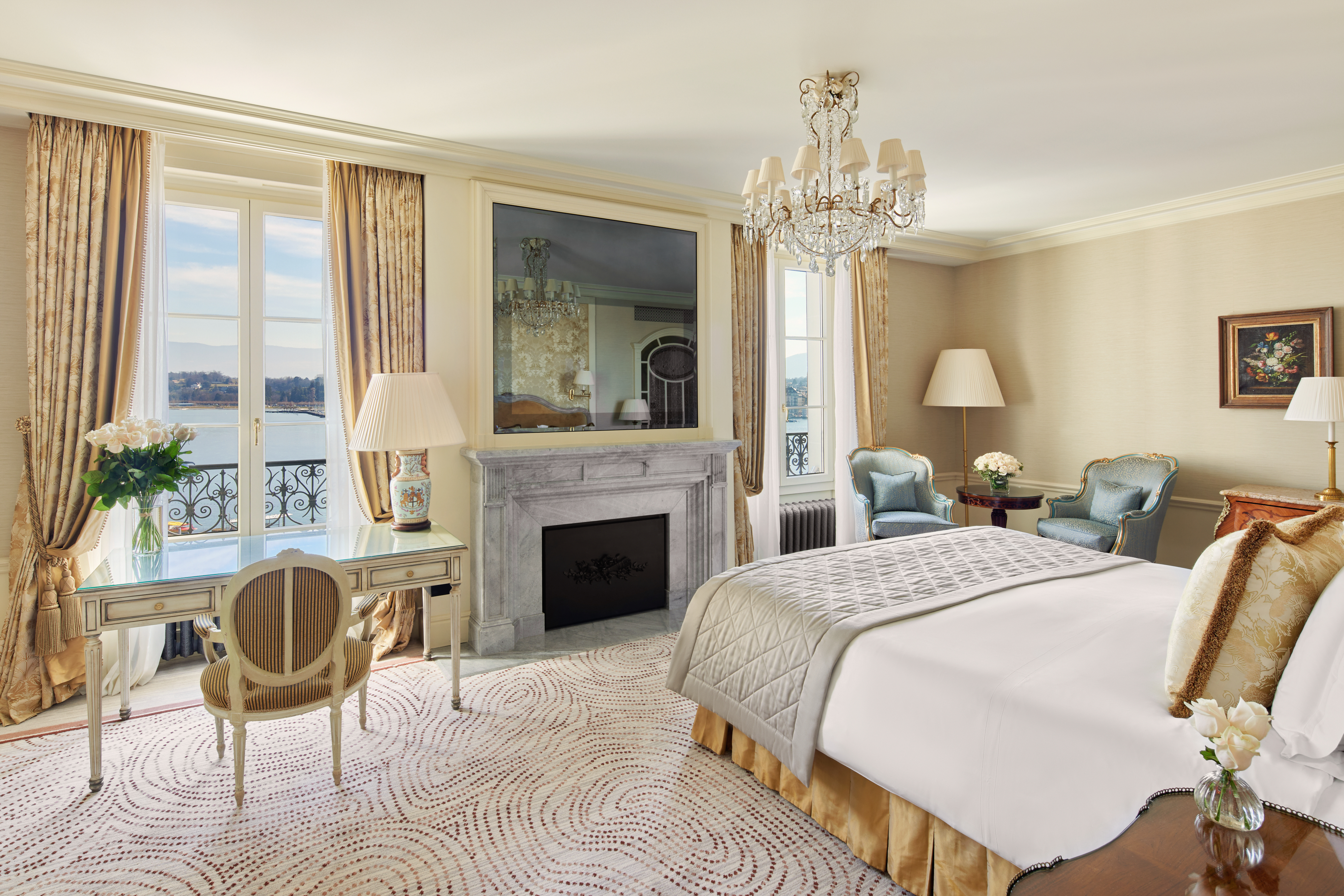
- Prestige junior Suite
- Interactive map of the Beau-Rivage Geneva area

General information
- Location: 13 Quai du Mont-Blanc; Geneva, Switzerland
- Coordinates: 46.209269°N 6.149834°E
- Opening: 1865; 161 years ago

Technical details
- Floor count: 6

Other information
- Number of rooms: 52
- Number of suites: 43
- Number of restaurants: Le Chat Botté (gastronomic restaurant); L’Atrium (bar & light meals)

Website
- www.beau-rivage.ch

Beau-Rivage Geneva is a five-star luxury hotel, founded in 1865 by the Mayer family. It is located in Geneva, Switzerland. Many other hotels throughout the world have the name "Beau-Rivage", but this hotel has remained independent since its creation and is still a family-owned business. The hotel has 90 rooms including 18 suites, 2 restaurants and a bar. It is a member of the Leading Hotels of the World.

== History ==
=== 19th century ===
- 1865 : The hotel is founded by Jean-Jacques Mayer.
- 1873: Charles II, Duke of Brunswick dies at the Beau-Rivage. The city of Geneva inherits 20 million gold francs from him. This sum of money will contribute to the construction of many buildings in Geneva, including its main theatre (Le Grand Théâtre).
- 1898 : The Austrian Empress Elisabeth dies at the Beau-Rivage, stabbed to death by Italian anarchist Luigi Lucheni soon after she left the hotel.

=== 20th century ===
- 1918 : Czechoslovakia is born, and its "birth" is officially signed at the Beau-Rivage.
- 1940-1944 : The Beau-Rivage closes its doors during the war.
- 1967 : The gastronomic restaurant "Le Chat Botté" is created.
- 1978 : Jacques Mayer becomes the 4th generation of the Mayer family to manage the hotel.
- 1987 : Uwe Barschel, former Minister-President of Schleswig-Holstein, is found dead in his Beau-Rivage room.
- 1987 : Sotheby's incorporates its Swiss offices at the Beau-Rivage.
- 1990 : The Beau-Rivage celebrates its 125th birthday.
- 1998 : The Beau-Rivage and the association "Sissi 1998" commemorate the 100th anniversary of the loss of Empress Elisabeth of Austria; a statue created by the British sculptor Philip Jackson is erected on the "Rotonde du Mont-Blanc", near the hotel.

=== 21st century ===
- 2000-2001 : The bar "L’Atrium" is thoroughly renovated, and some fragments of Pompeii-styled frescoes are discovered.
- 2002 : Dominique Gauthier becomes the chef of the restaurant "Le Chat Botté".
- 2008 : It becomes the first and only luxury hotel in Geneva to hold an ISO 9001-200 quality certificate.
- 2008 : "Le Chat Botté" scores 18/20 in the Gault-Millau guide.
- 2009 : The Beau-Rivage joins the Leading Hotels of the World.

== See also ==
- List of hotels in Switzerland
- Tourism in Switzerland
