= Helmhaus Hotel =

Hotel in Zurich, Switzerland

Coordinates: 47°22′09″N 8°32′39″E

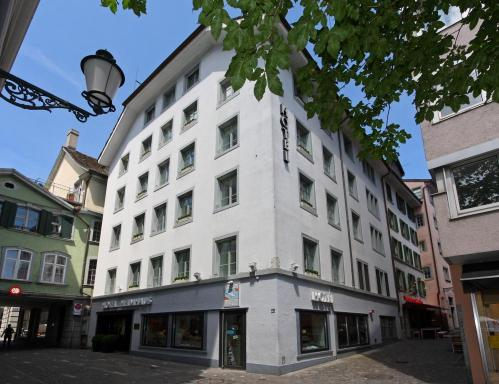
Heimhaus Hotel

The Helmhaus Hotel (officially: Boutique Hotel Helmhaus) is a 4-Star-Hotel in Zurich. With its recorded history stretching back to 1356 it is the oldest guesthouse in Zurich still in operation. As of 2021 it is the smallest 4-Star-Hotel of Zurich.

== History ==
=== Origin ===
The Hotel takes its name from the nearby Helmhaus.

In the history books the building was first mentioned as inn in 1356 under the name "Hie zum Rosslyn" (Hier zum Rössli). It was a fiefdom of the Fraumünster Abbey. The owner was staying in Zurich on orders of the Abbot of Einsiedeln.

=== 15th and 16th Century ===
One of the many innkeepers of the Zum Rosslyn was Oswald Reinhart (or: Osswald Reinhard) from Kempten in the Allgäu (today's south of Germany). In 1468 Oswald Reinhart obtained the citizenship of the City of Zurich. In 1487 he took over the inn of the Zum Rosslyn, together with his wife Elisabetha Wunzürn (or: Elssbetha Wynzürnin). Reinhart's daughter Anna Reinhart (or: Anna Reinhardt, Anna Reinhard) who spent a part of her childhood at the Zum Rosslyn, lived together from 1522 with the reformer and priest Ulrich Zwingli (or: Huldrich Zwingli). His statue can be seen in front of the Wasserkirche (Water Church) next to the Helmhaus. On 2 April 1524 both got married at the Grossmünster Church of Zurich. Anna Reinhart was the first clergyman's wife of Switzerland, and she was very committed to improve the conditions under which the poor of Zurich were living. A brass plate at the facade of the hotel commemorates her.

During the Zürcher Bildersturm of 1524 (a "Bildersturm" was part of the reformation where paintings, sculptures and church windows depicting Christ and saints, and sometimes even organs were removed from European churches) Rudolf Koch, high ranking clergyman of the Grossmünster Church had the famous altar paintings of Hans Leu the Elder brought to the Zum Rosslyn, on the initiative of Zwingli, to save them from destruction. At the beginning of the 20th century they were re-discovered by coincidence during renovation works and can be seen today at the Swiss National Museum.

=== Today ===
From 1833 the building was part of the Hôtel du Lac near the Limmat - today it houses an Italian restaurant. 1935 the house was transferred into a commercial and residential building which housed the Café Sultan on the ground floor. In 1961 a further modification to the Hotel Garni Mondial was done.

In 1970 the hotel was bought by the Swiss family Mengis and Weibel who christened it Helmhaus, and with it continues the 650-year-old tradition of Swiss hospitality. Extensive renovations since then included the adding of a fifth floor with five design rooms and the insertion of wooden floors in all rooms. The latest extensive refurbishments were made between 2008 and 2012. Further extensive renovations have been conducted in 2015 and 2019. The hotel has now 24 rooms.

== See also ==
- List of hotels in Switzerland
- Tourism in Switzerland
