= Teufelhof Basel =

- Interactive map of the Teufelhof Basel area

General information
- Location: Basel, Switzerland
- Coordinates: 47.5559°N 7.5864°E
- Opened: 1989

Website
- teufelhof.com

Teufelhof Basel is a hotel in Basel, Switzerland.

== Hotel ==
The hotel opened on April 28, 1989. It is located in the old town of Basel.

The Teufelhof Basel consists of two buildings, the art hotel and the gallery hotel. The art hotel has eight rooms and one suite, all of which have been created as habitable works of art. The gallery hotel has 20 rooms and four suites and is also used as an exhibition space. Nine rooms were designed by different artists who were invited to participate in ongoing projects.

It also has two restaurants (one of which has received a Michelin star), a theatre, a wine shop, and a bar.

== See also ==
- List of hotels in Switzerland
- Tourism in Switzerland
