= Hotel des Trois Couronnes =

Hotel in Vevey, near Lausanne, Switzerland

Coordinates: 46.4582°N 6.8484°E

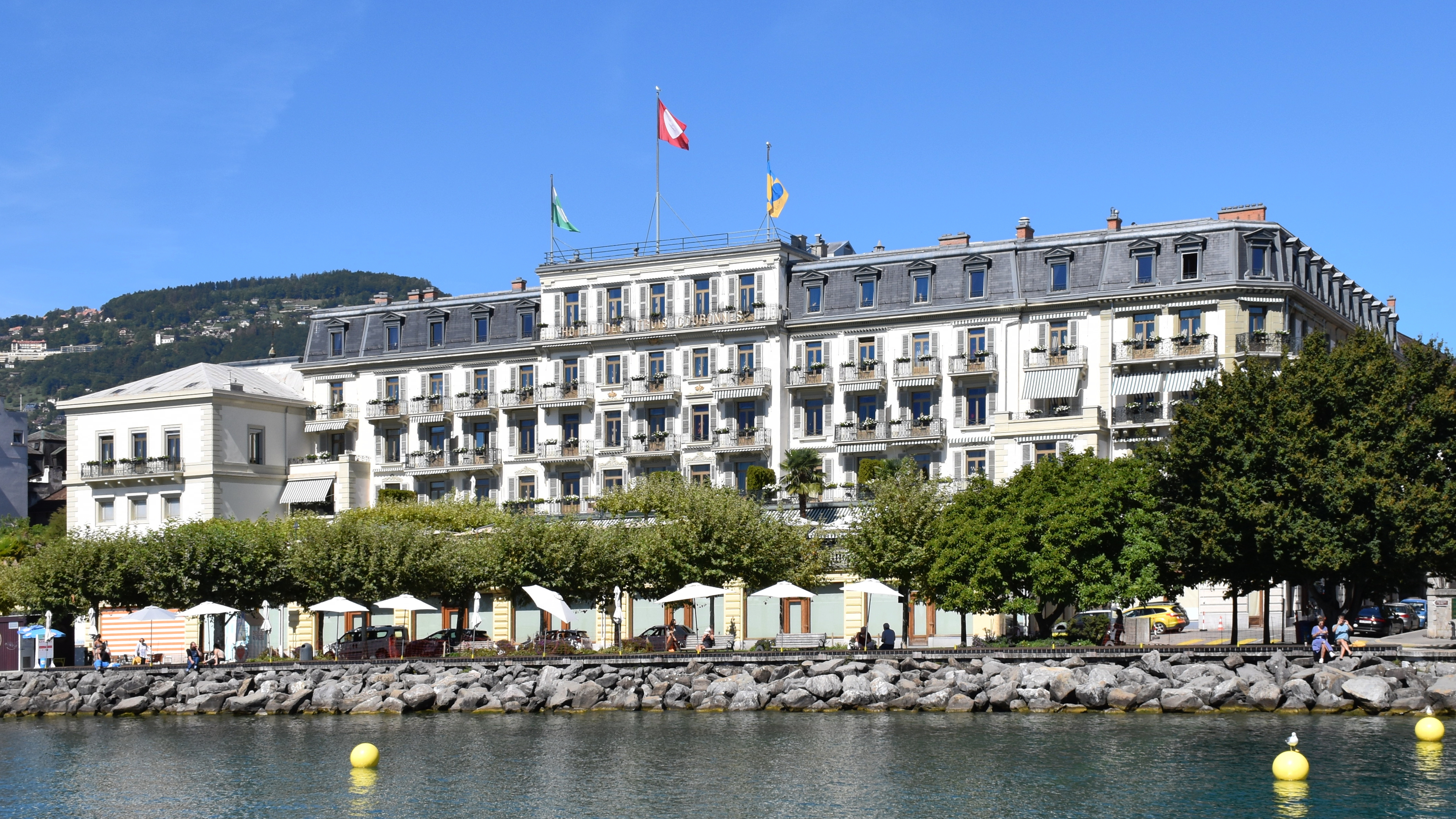
Hôtel des Trois Couronnes

The Hôtel des Trois Couronnes is a hotel in Vevey, Switzerland. It was built in 1842 on the ruins of the "Belles Truches" castle, built in 1376 (1). This building once destroyed left the place to a hotel built by Philippe Franel and inaugurated on May 3, 1842 (3) under the name "Hôtel Monnet" (3), the name of its owner back then. Gabriel Monnet named it "Trois Couronnes" because he owned an inn of the same name, also situated on Vevey's Rue du Simplon (4).

Originally built with a direct access to Lake Geneva, the building lost it in 1863 with the construction of the lakeside promenade. In 1890, several transformations occurred: two annexes were added to the main building, as well as a ballroom in the west wing and a new residential area in the east wing (5).

The building is registered as a cultural property of national value (6). It was entirely renovated in 2000 and since 2003 is a Swiss historical hotel (7).

Among the many celebrities who stayed at the hotel, three crowned heads allowed the hotel property to justify its name: Queen Olga of Greece, the Maharajah Holkar of Indore and King William III of the Netherlands (8).

Inspired by the hotel's intrigue, the writer Henry James wrote his short story Daisy Miller.

== See also ==
- List of hotels in Switzerland
- Tourism in Switzerland

== Bibliography ==
- Fédia Muller, Vevey et l'Hôtel des trois couronnes, 1958
