= Hotel Le Toiny =

Hotel in Saint Barthélemy in the Caribbean

Coordinates: 17°53′57″N 62°47′49″W

Hotel Le Toiny is a luxury hotel in Saint Barthélemy in the Caribbean, situated near Anse Toiny on the southeastern coast. It has 12 rooms. It is served by the French restaurant Le Gaïac, named after the rare gaiac trees found in the vicinity.
