= Scandic Hotel Ariadne =

Hotel in Stockholm, Sweden

Coordinates: 59°20′56″N 18°06′48″E

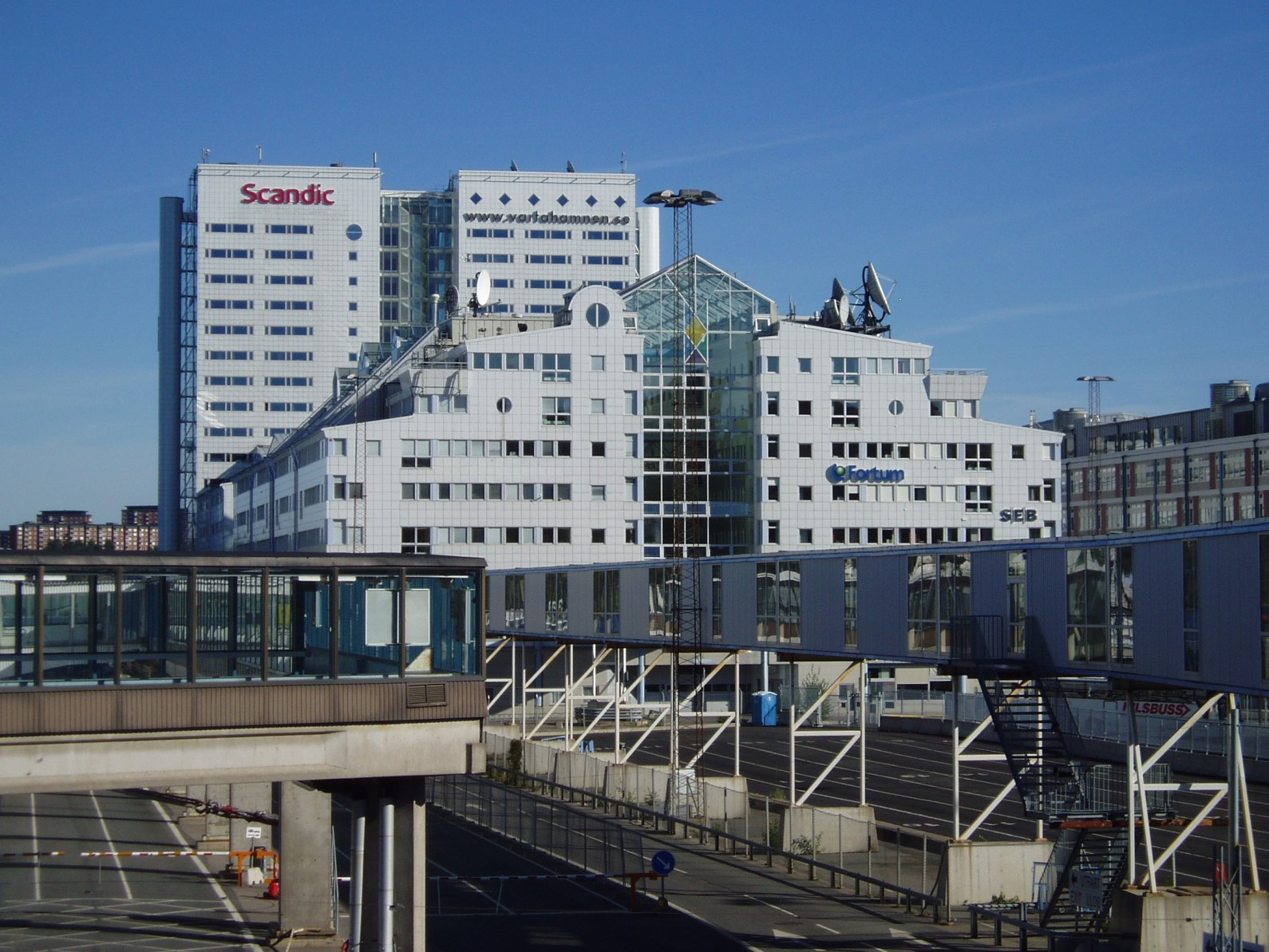

The Scandic Hotel Ariadne is located at Värtahamnen in Stockholm, Sweden. It was built in 1989 and is 62 m tall and includes 17 floors and 283 rooms.
