= Sheraton Aleppo Hotel =

Building in Aleppo, Syria

Sheraton Hotel Aleppo
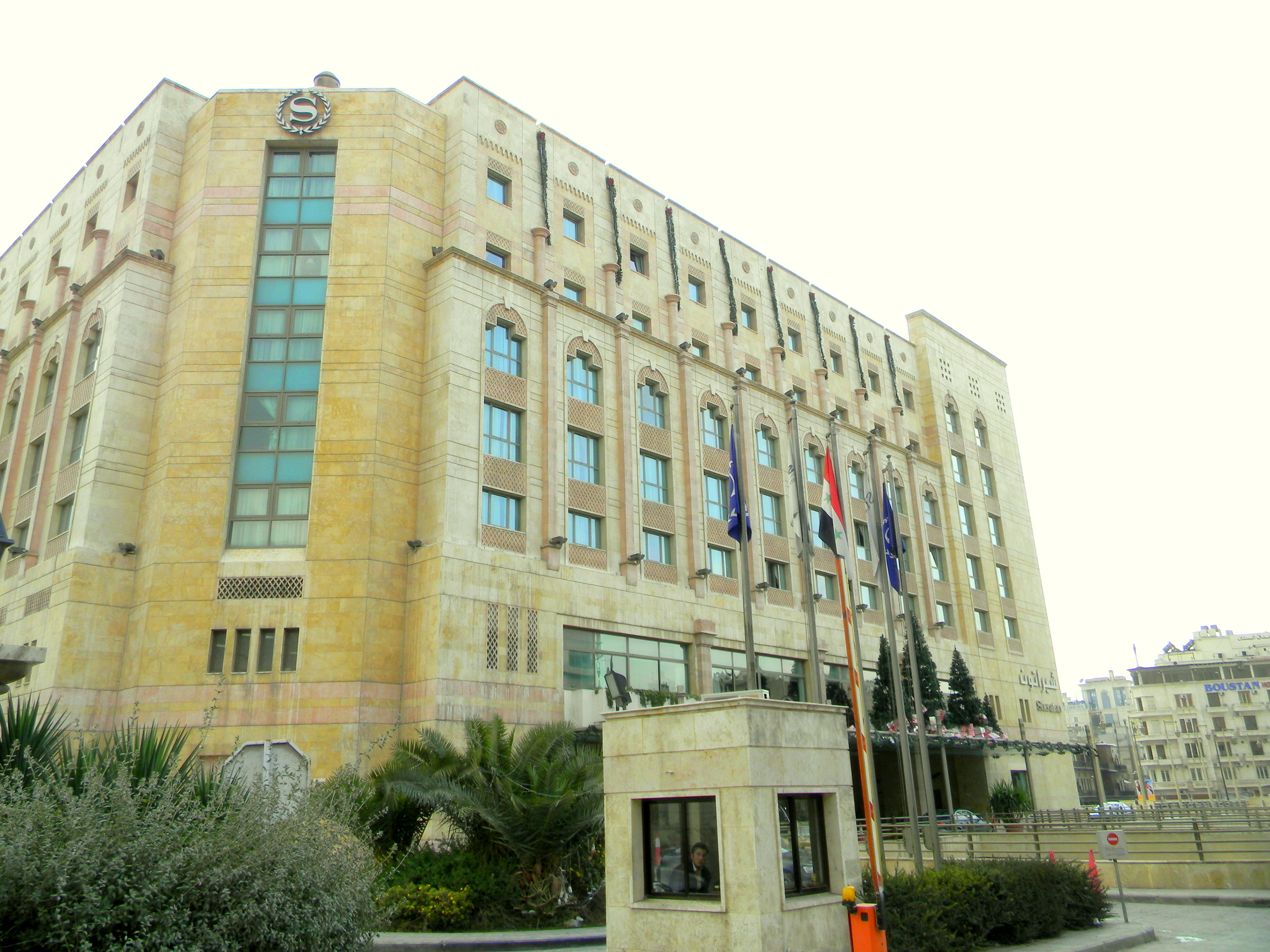
- Sheraton Aleppo

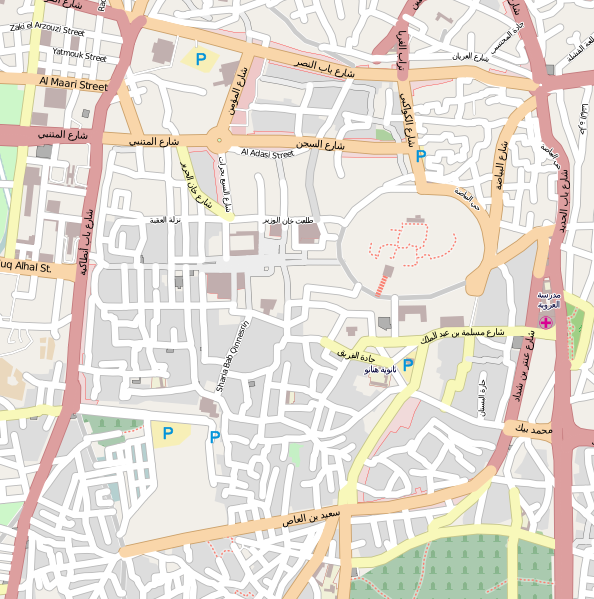
- Location within Ancient City of Aleppo

General information
- Location: Aleppo, Syria
- Coordinates: 36°12′17″N 37°9′14″E
- Opening: 2007

Technical details
- Floor count: 6

Other information
- Number of rooms: 199
- Number of suites: 31
- Number of restaurants: 9

The Sheraton Aleppo Hotel is a former five-star hotel opened in 2007 in the ancient part of Aleppo city, within the historic walls, on Al-Khandaq street, Aqabeh district, near the Bab al-Faraj clock tower.

The architecture of the hotel reflects the old traditional style of the Aleppine buildings, combining a historic 15th century facade with modern interiors. The 6 storied building with 199 rooms and suites has an outdoor swimming pool, a modern gym and various restaurants and bars.

In January 2012, Starwood severed all connections with the hotel, due to U.S. sanctions against Syria, and the hotel is no longer an official part of the Sheraton chain. During the Syrian Civil War, the Aleppo Sheraton was converted to military barracks by the Syrian Army, as it was located just within territory they controlled. Fighting in Aleppo ended in December 2016, and the hotel reopened in 2018. It continues to use the Sheraton name and logo, without permission from the chain's current owner, Marriott International, which acquired Starwood.
