= Baron Hotel =

Hotel in Aleppo, Syria

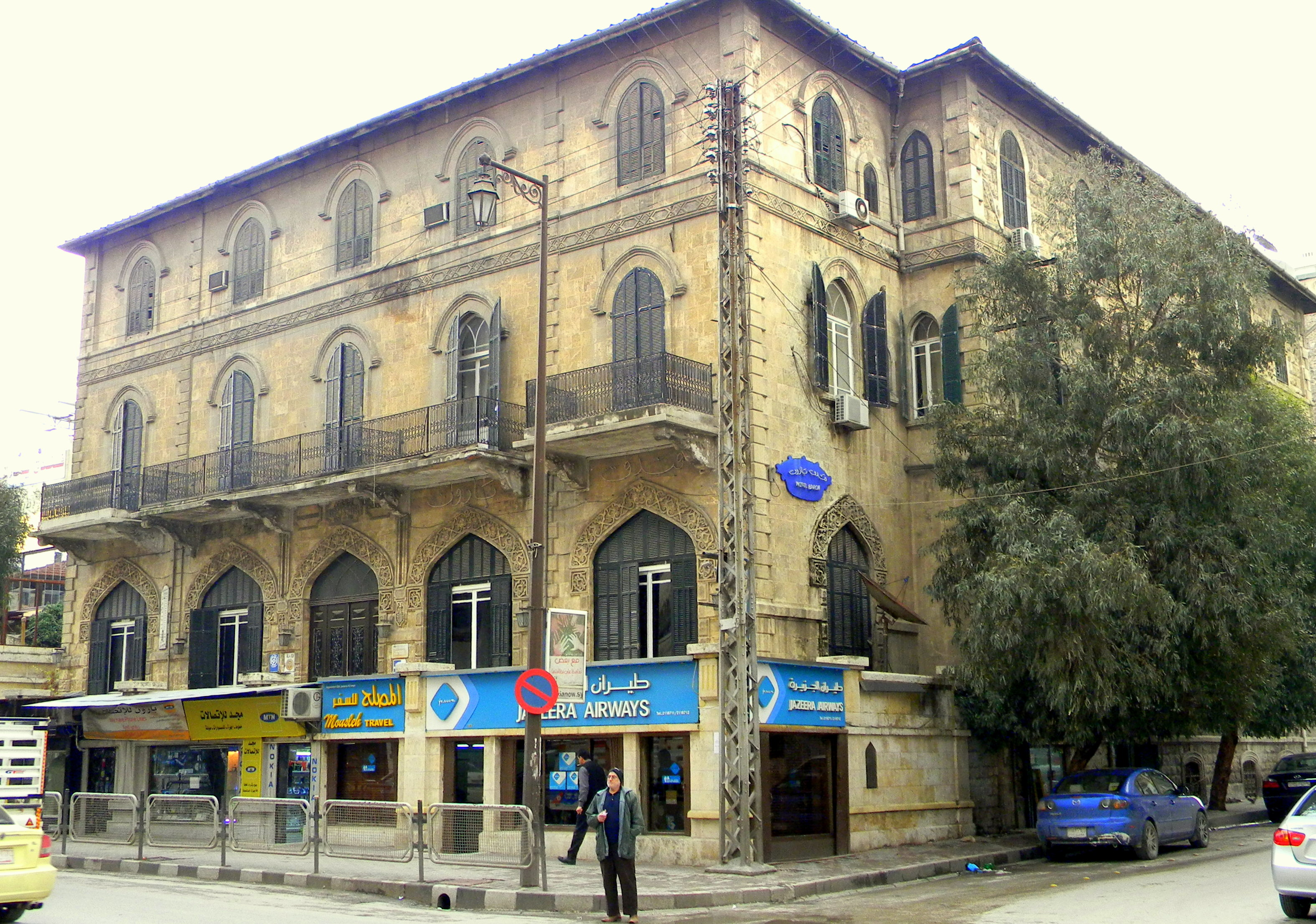
- Le Baron

- Location within Aleppo

General information
- Location: Aleppo, Syria
- Coordinates: 36°12′18″N 37°9′00″E
- Opening: 1909–1911
- Owner: Mazloumian Brothers
- Operator: Armen Mazloumian (director)

Technical details
- Floor count: 3

Other information
- Number of rooms: 17
- Number of restaurants: 1

Baron Hotel (also Baron's Hotel; French: Hôtel Baron or Le Baron), is the oldest hotel that currently operates in Syria. It is located on Baron street in down-town Aleppo's Aziziyeh district. The Baron has sustained some civil war-related minor damage but is still standing.

== History ==
The idea of building a luxury hotel in Aleppo rose at the end of the 19th century. Sometime around 1870, a member of the Armenian family of Mazloumian (from eastern Anatolia) was on her way to Jerusalem for pilgrimage. While passing through Aleppo which was—even at that time—a cosmopolitan centre of commerce, she noticed how uncomfortable Europeans felt when staying in the traditional caravanserais. Eventually, she decided to build something modern in Aleppo and the result was the Ararat Hotel, the first hotel in the region, at the end of the 19th century. A few years later, before World War I, the brothers Onnig and Armenak Mazloumian enlarged their business by setting up the new Baron's Hotel. In 1909, amongst the gardens that were then on the outskirts of old Aleppo, they built the first floor of the current building; the second floor followed in 1911, and the third in 1940. During the French mandate, the street where Le Baron was built, was named after General Henri Gouraud. After the independence of Syria in 1946, the government decided to rename the street after "Baron" for the fame and the importance of the hotel.

The Hotel's fortune reflects the changes that have taken place in the country. Baron's is one of several notable hotels in the Middle East that "seem to tell a story of how a region once viewed by foreigners as a playground has given way to a newer imagery of hard regimes and struggles to get by."

== Recent Developments ==
In November 2014 the hotel was forced to close its doors as the Syrian civil war further tightened its grip on the city. The front line separating government and rebel forces lay just metres away from the building. For a time the hotel restarted operations despite the gravity of the war conditions. It had reportedly also been kept open to shelter refugees who had come in from the countryside. The Baron is still standing but has sustained some war related damage from snipers and five mortars. The fate of the historical artefacts inside the building, including its giant 1917 Stephens thermometer with French script, is unknown.

== Notable guests ==
Until the Second World War, during the French Mandate most of the guests were British, French or German. British agents posing as archaeologists spied on German generals, who arranged opulent banquets for their Ottoman allies while German engineers built the rail line from Berlin to Baghdad.

The second floor of the hotel has witnessed the presence of political leaders and numerous cultural icons: Lawrence of Arabia slept in room 202 (there is a copy of his unpaid bar bill displayed in the hotel); King Faisal declared Syria's independence from the balcony in room 215; Agatha Christie wrote the first part of Murder on the Orient Express in room 203. The Presidential Suite was occupied in turn by Charles de Gaulle, King Gustaf VI Adolf of Sweden, Egypt's Gamal Abdel Nasser, Syria's former President Hafez al-Assad, Sheikh Zayed bin Sultan Al Nahyan (the founder of the United Arab Emirates), and the American billionaire David Rockefeller. Other notable guests include Dame Freya Stark, Julie Christie, Mr and Mrs Theodore Roosevelt, Kemal Atatürk, Lady Louise Mountbatten, Charles Lindbergh, Glenn Richer and Yuri Gagarin. In 1916, after the surrender of Kut al Amarah, Major General Sir Charles Vere Ferrers Townshend stayed in a suite here as a prisoner.

== Gallery ==
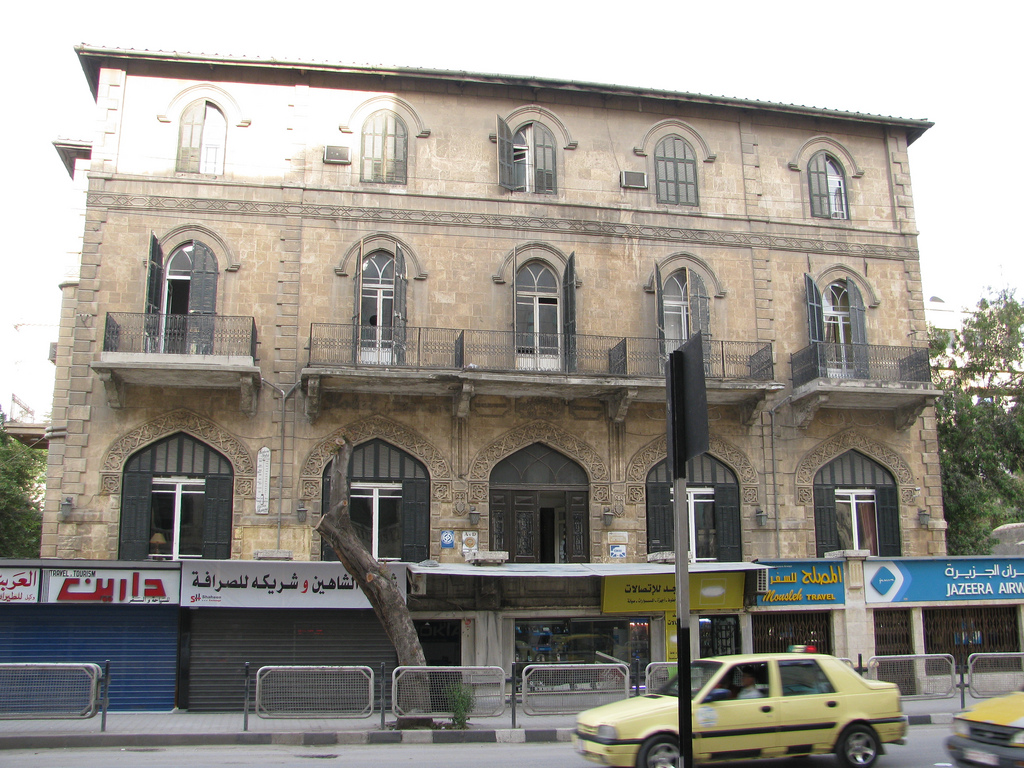
Baron Hotel seen from Baron St

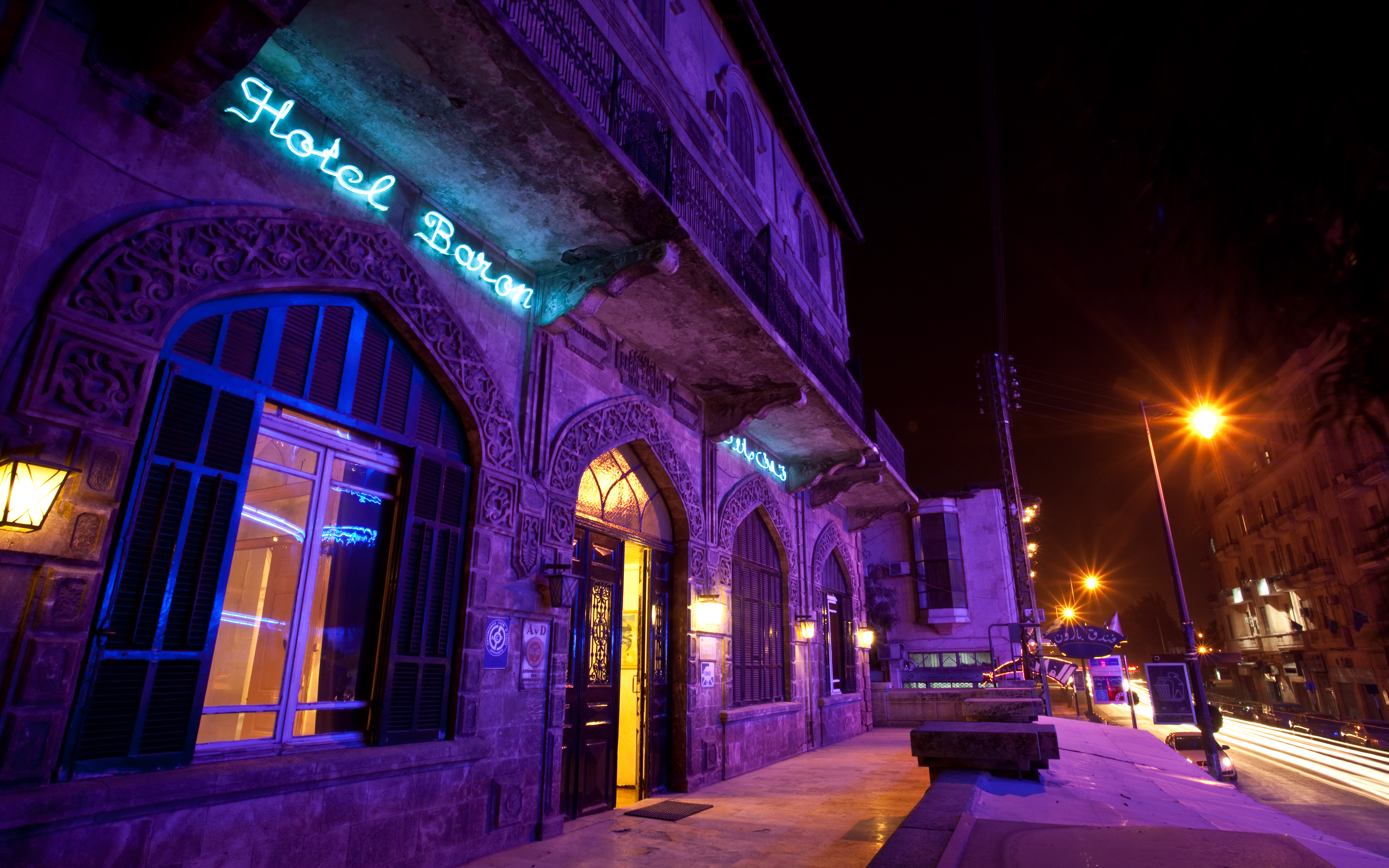
The Baron Hotel illuminated at night

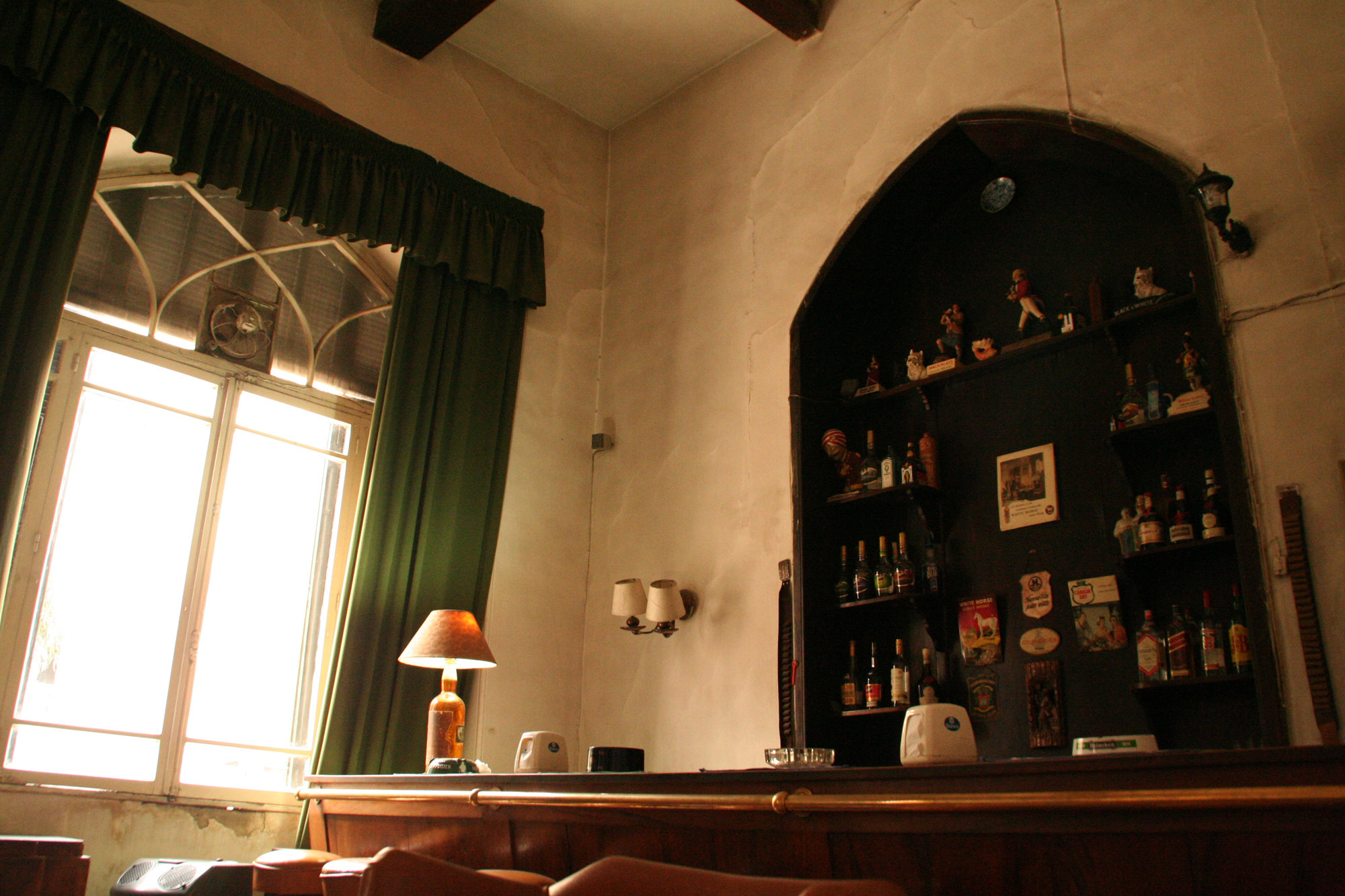
Baron Hotel Bar

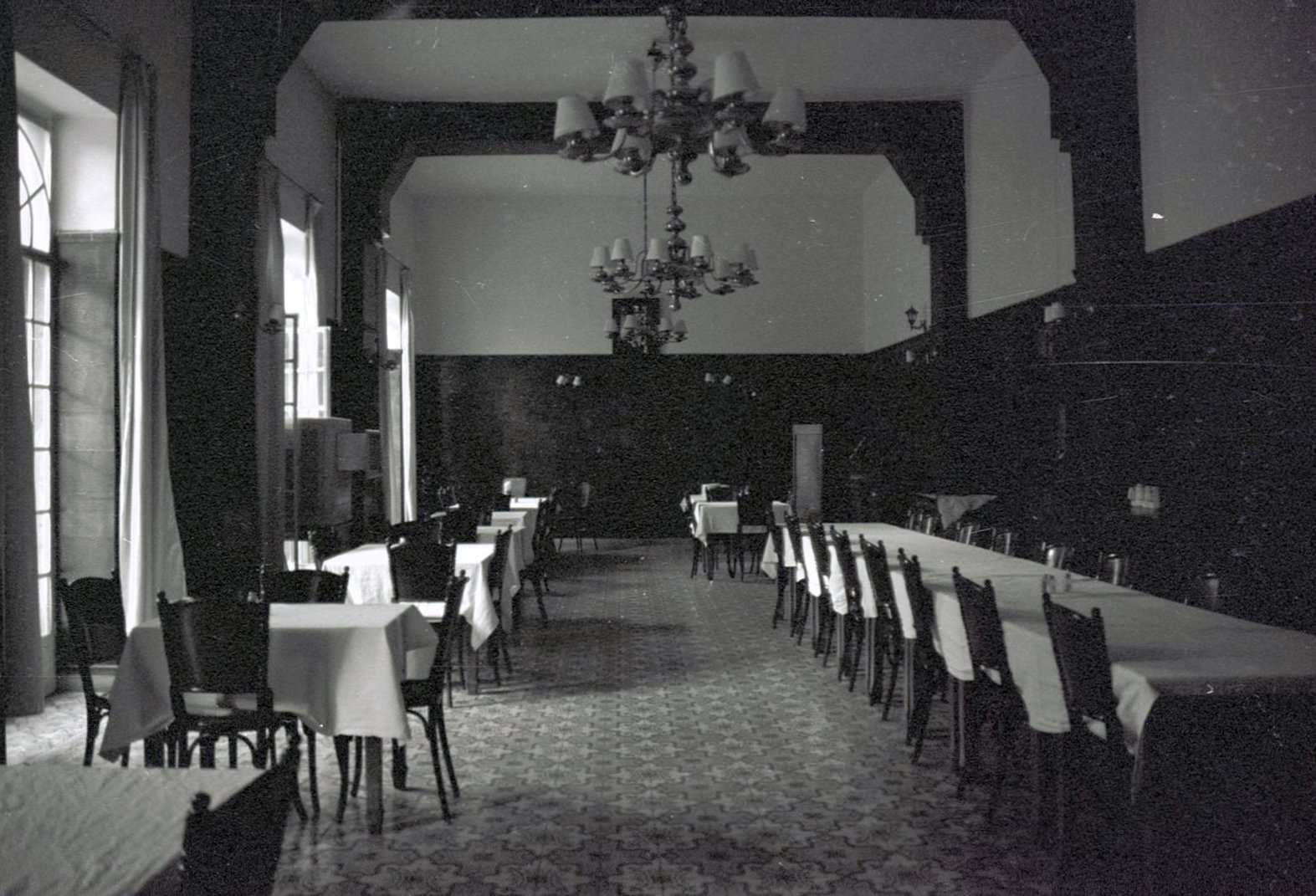
Baron Hotel restaurant (1940)

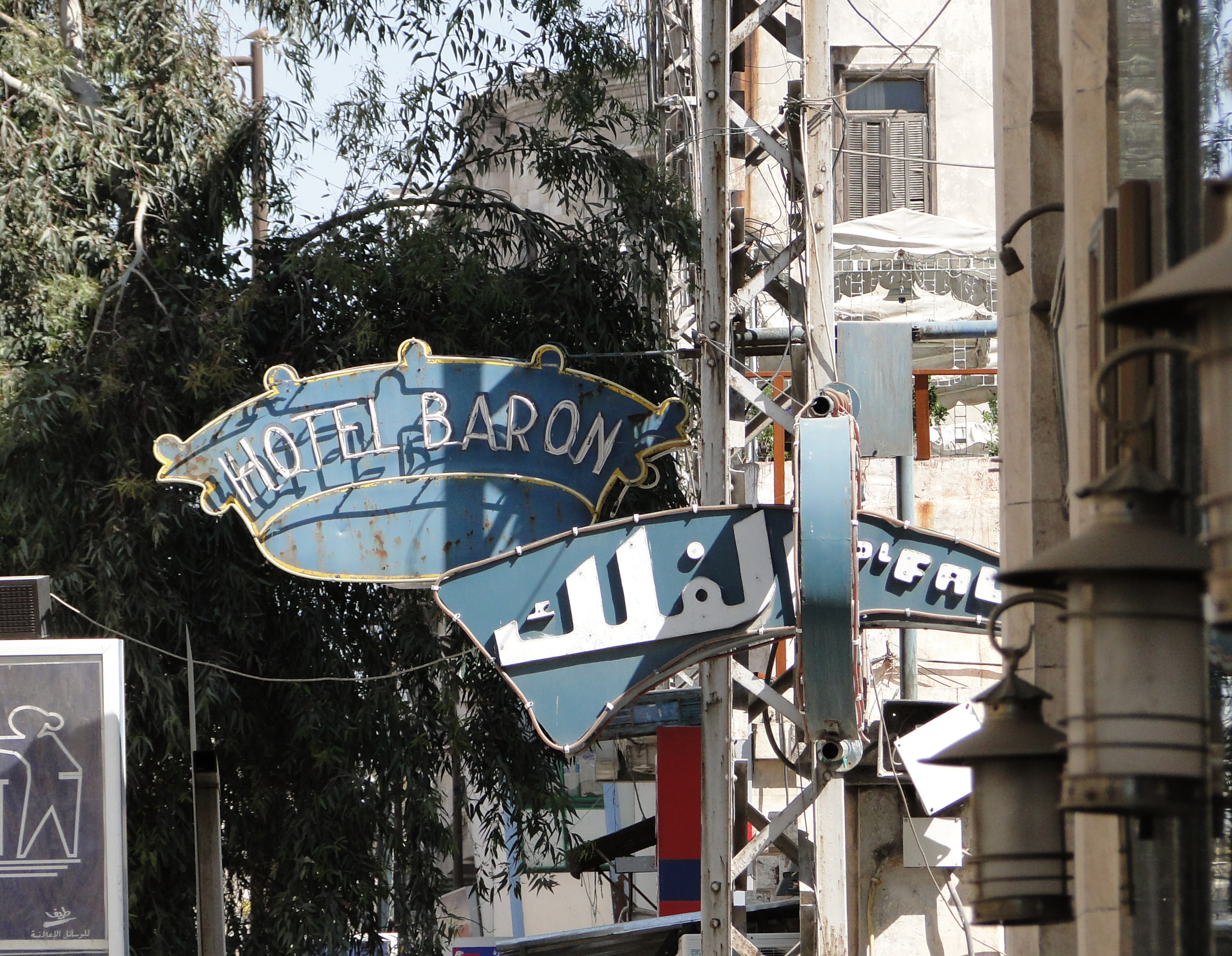
Aleppo's Baron Hotel signage

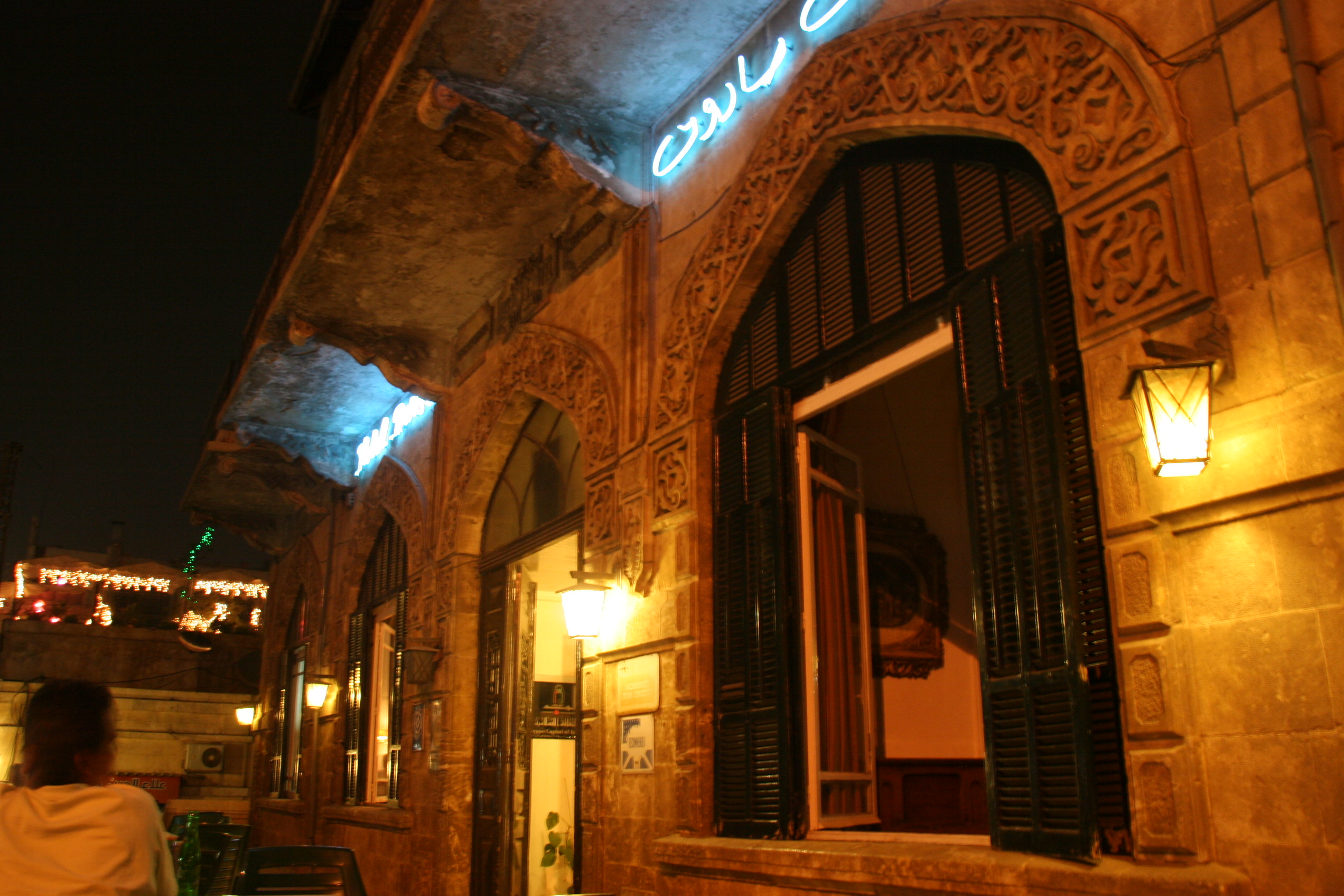
Baron Hotel at night (2009)

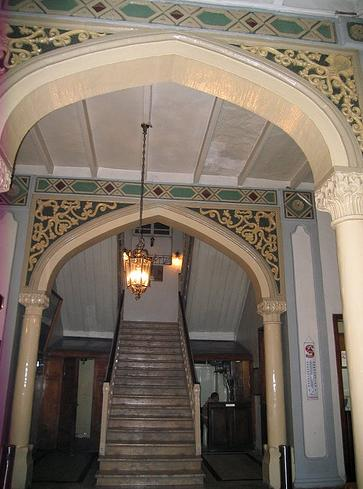
Baron Hotel Staircase

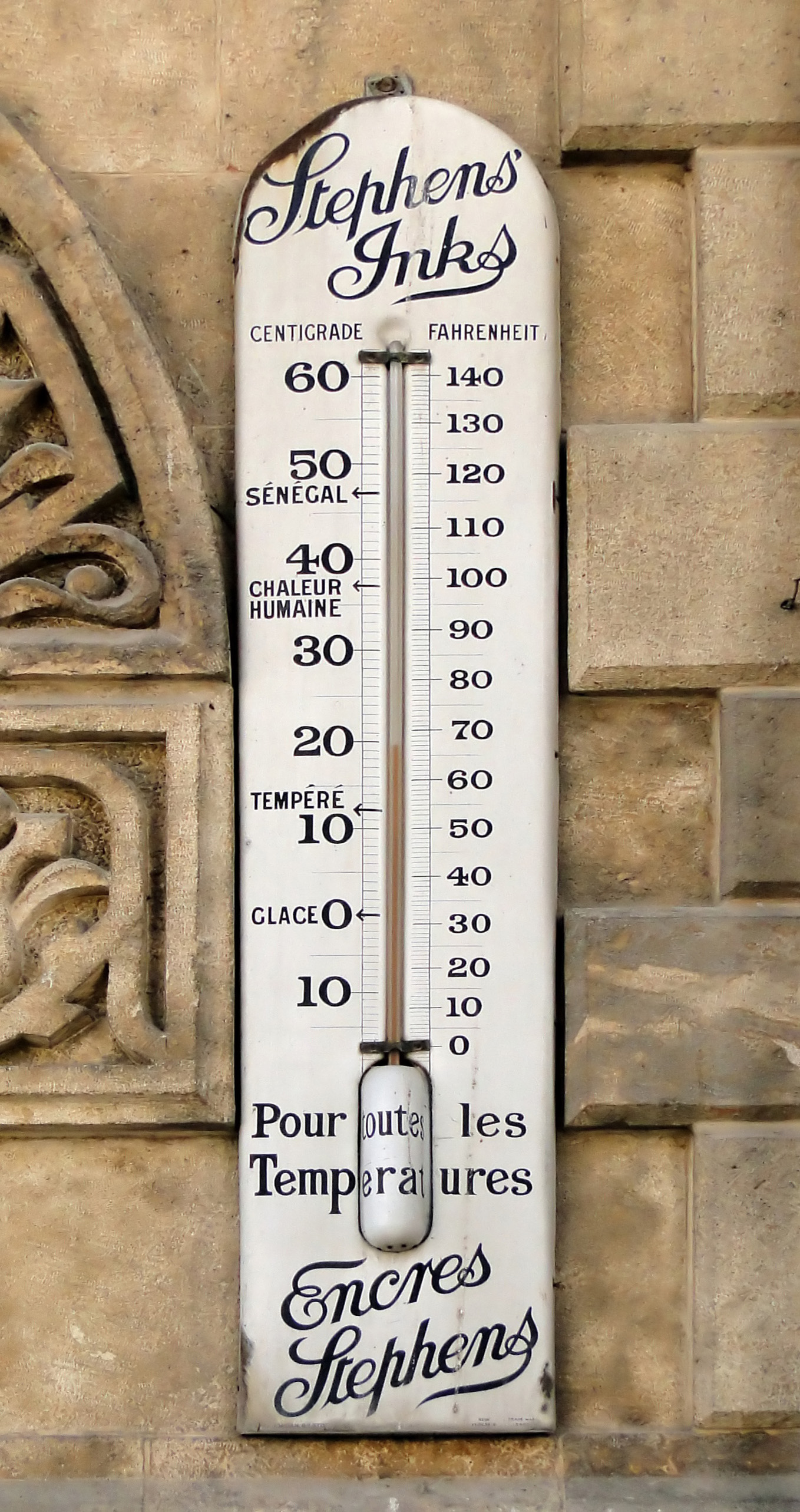
Baron Hotel Stephens thermometer (now missing)

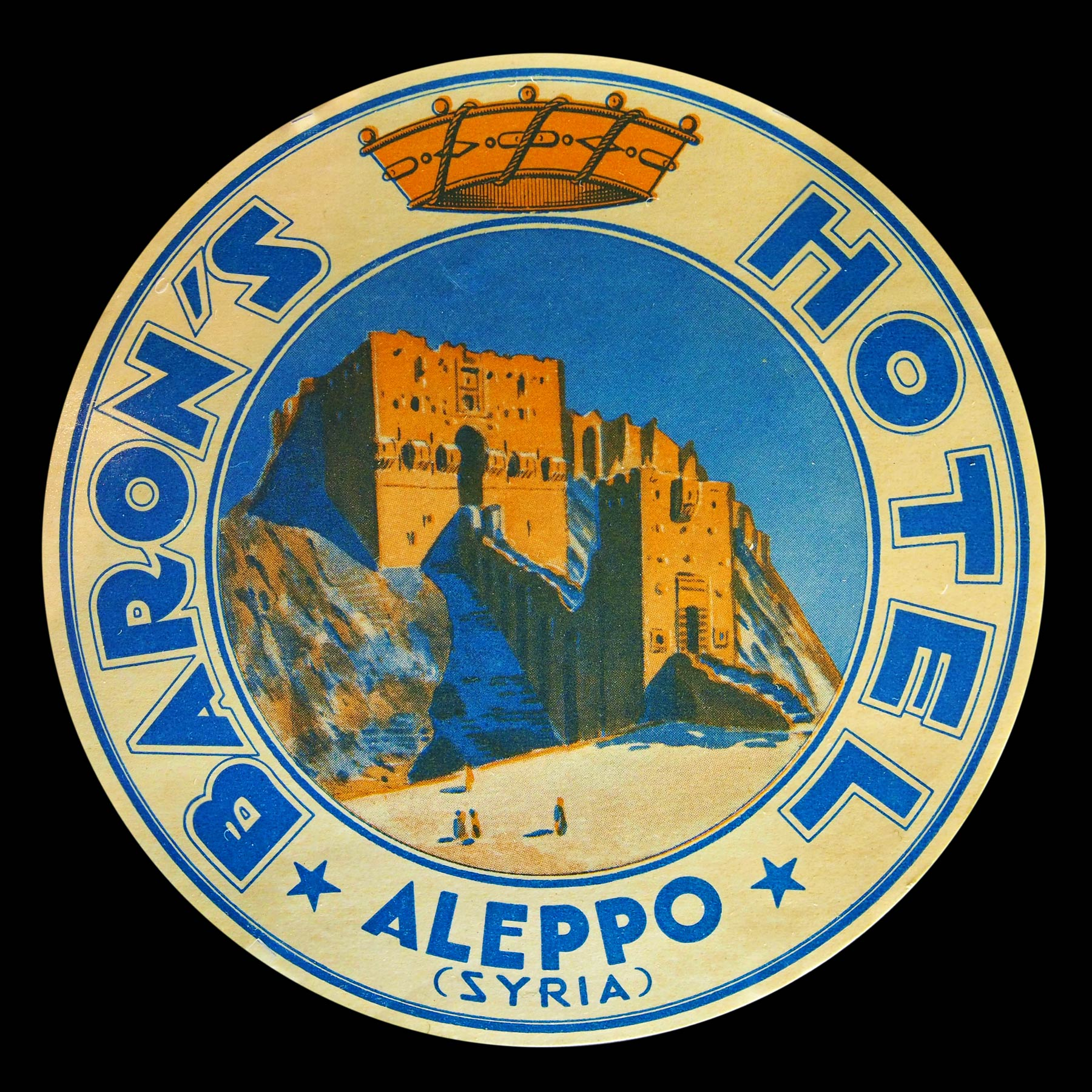
Luggage tag from Baron Hotel circa 1935
