= Royal Swazi Spa =

Hotel and entertainment complex in Eswatini

Coordinates: 26.407722°S 31.169611°E

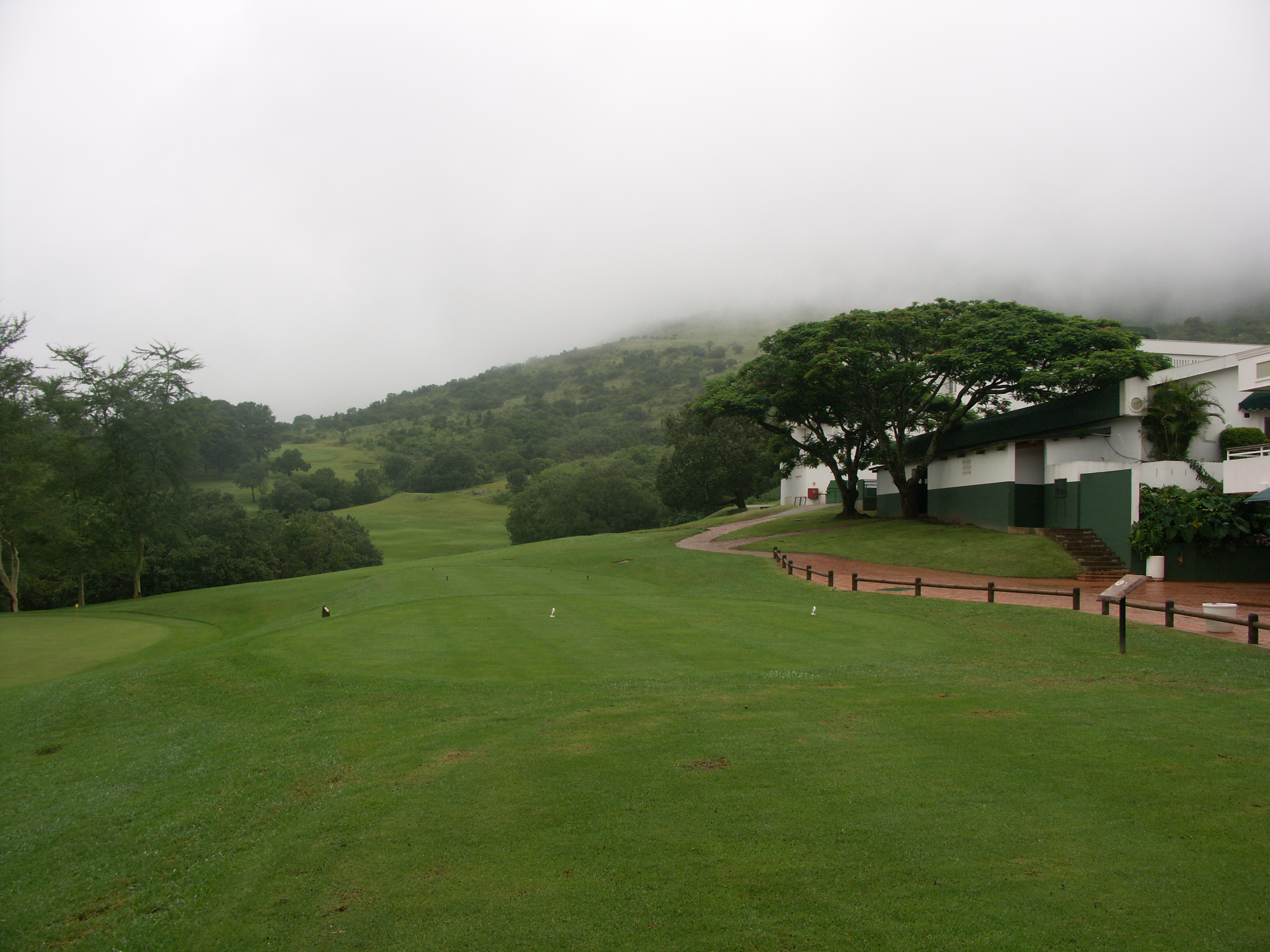
Golf at the Royal Swazi Spa, on a misty day

The Royal Swazi Spa is a major entertainment complex in the Ezulwini Valley of Eswatini. Founded in 1965, the complex is located 4 hours from Johannesburg by road. It is home to a casino, a par-72 golf course, and a spa. The hotel features 149 rooms and is known for its luxurious accommodation. Business Insights called the Royal Swazi Sun Hotel the flagship of Sun International's four hotels in the area.

It opened in 1965, three years prior to Swaziland's independence. It was the first casino-hotel in the region. It was important as a major resort in the area that did not adhere to the Apartheid policies of South Africa. The casino is considered an important part of the country's foreign exchange and serves 250,000 people a year, primarily from neighboring South Africa and Mozambique as well as Italy, Switzerland and France.

The golf course has hosted many professional tournaments, and is the venue for two current Sunshine Tour events, the Royal Swazi Sun Open and the Lombard Insurance Classic.

== See also ==
- List of golf clubs granted Royal status
