= Podsmreka pri Višnji Gori =

Podsmreka pri Višnji Gori Podsmreka (until 1953)
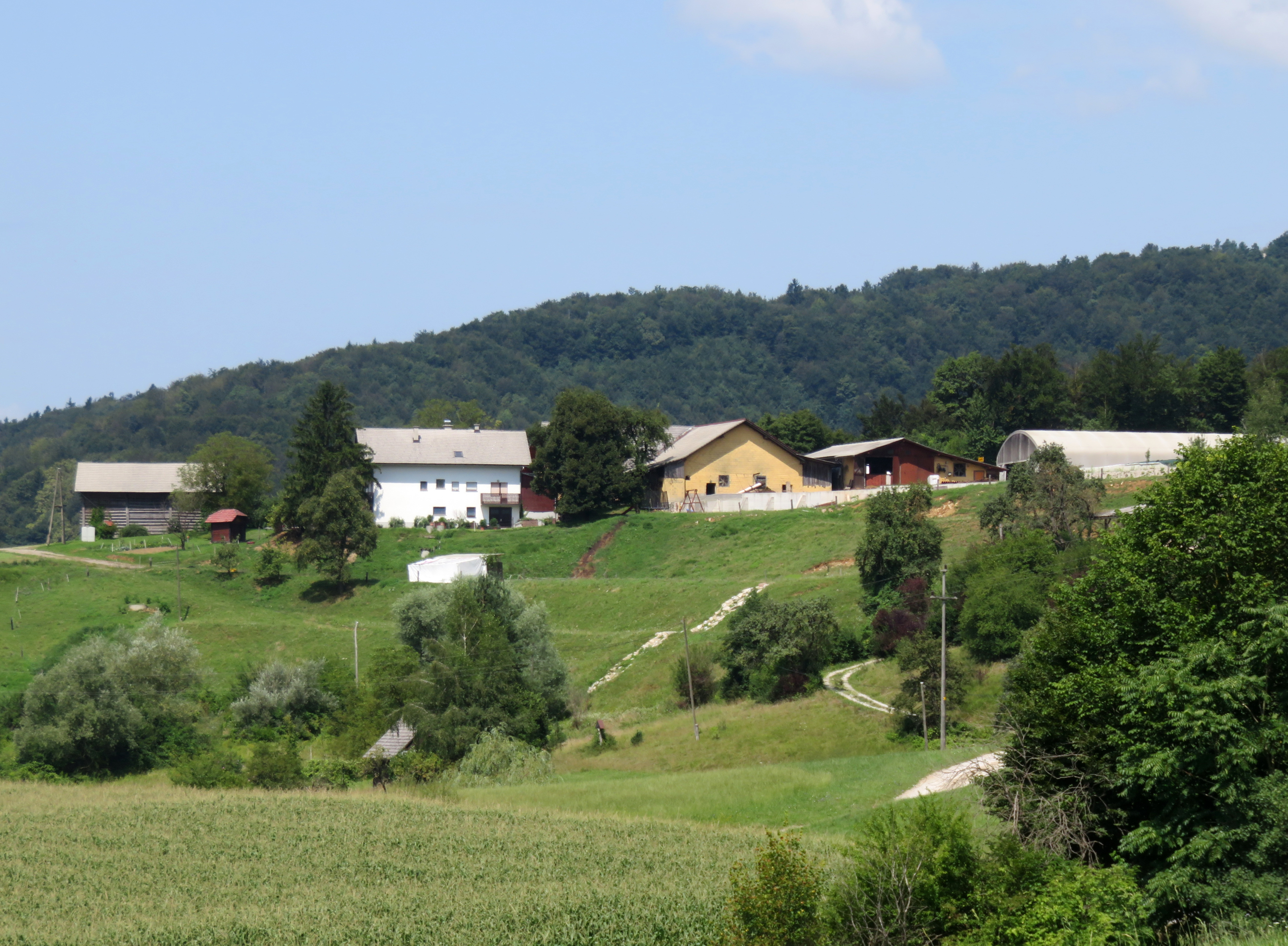

- Location in Slovenia
- Coordinates: 45°57′4.55″N 14°46′1.77″E
- Country: Slovenia
- Traditional region: Lower Carniola
- Statistical region: Central Slovenia
- Municipality: Ivančna Gorica

Area
  - Total: 0.85 km^{2} (0.33 sq mi)
- Elevation: 366.7 m (1,203 ft)

Population (2002)
  - Total: 33

Podsmreka pri Višnji Gori (pronounced [pɔdˈsmɾeːka pɾi ˈʋiːʃnji ˈɡɔːɾi]) is a settlement east of Višnja Gora in the Municipality of Ivančna Gorica in central Slovenia. The area is part of the historical region of Lower Carniola. The municipality is now included in the Central Slovenia Statistical Region.

== Name ==
The name of the settlement was changed from Podsmreka to Podsmreka pri Višnji Gori in 1953.

== Podsmreka Castle ==
Podsmreka castle (German: Schloß Smreck) is a 16th-century manor house that stands east of the settlement between the A2 motorway and a gravel pit.

Among its former owners were the Paradaiser, Blagay, Lamberg, and Lichtenberg noble families. Later the manor was owned by the "Barons" of Roschütz, a family involved in a late 19th-century scandal in Carniola, when it was revealed that the patriarch, Baron Filip Roschütz was not a nobleman at all. He had invented both his title and his ancestry, which was a criminal act in the Habsburg empire. His son Emil Roschütz (later Emil Ravenegg), a renowned apiarist, played an important role in establishing and promoting beekeeping in Carniola.

The manor complex was built in an unusual E-shape, with five wings partly surrounding two quadrangles. The western half of the complex contained the luxurious living quarters. Remains of Renaissance arcades are visible in the quad-facing wall of the south wing. The eastern half of the complex was much more utilitarian, consisting of stables and various outbuildings. There is a stone well dated to 1799 in the imposing western courtyard. A concrete wall separates the two courtyards from the access road.
