= Sporthotel Pontresina =

Hotel in Graubünden, Switzerland

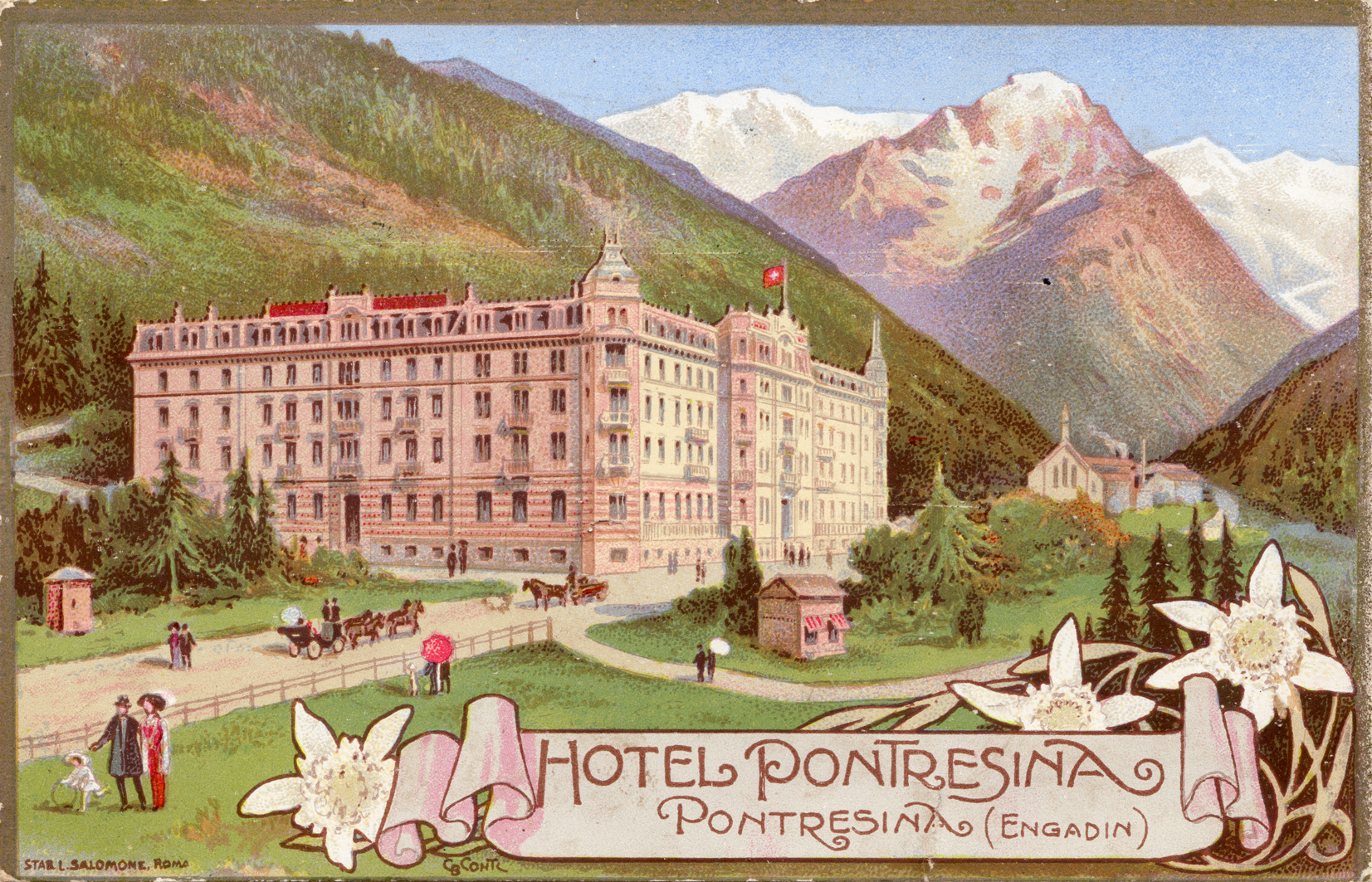
- Hotel Pontresina (ca. 1915)

- Location within Switzerland

General information
- Location: Pontresina, Graubünden, Switzerland
- Coordinates: 46°29′32″N 9°54′13″E
- Opening: 1881

Design and construction
- Architects: Jakob Ragaz (1881 & 1895)
- Developer: Florian Stoppany (1881)

Other information
- Number of rooms: 82 (2015)

Website
- Official site

The Sporthotel Pontresina was completed in 1881. It is a three star hotel in the resort village of Pontresina, slightly less than two hours (depending on road/rail conditions) to the south of Chur in Graubünden, Switzerland.

The hotel comprises 140 beds in 82 rooms, with underground parking for 60 cars. During the summer season its focus is on hikers and mountain bikers, while winter season guests mostly come for the skiing and other winter sports.

== Brief history ==
The history of the hotel goes back to the boom in Swiss tourism during the second half of the nineteenth century. The founder of the hotel, Florian Stoppany, who came from a family of bakers and confectioners, acquired the "Maison Stiffler", a village guest house, and employed the architect Jakob Ragaz to expand it into the mid-sized Post Hotel Pontresina, which opened in 1881. The further expansion to a first class renaissance revival hotel took place in 1895. From now on the clientele of what was now known as the Hotel Pontresina came increasingly from the German upper middle class. Following the installation of central heating, in 1906/07, for the first time, the hotel opened for a winter season.

In 1909 a company acquired the hotel from the Stoppany family, but the family remained closely involved. The First World War which broke out in 1914 marked the start of a long period of decline in the hotel's fortunes. Two World Wars and the years of austerity that followed the Wall Street Crash of 1929, combined with large and sudden fluctuations in currency exchange rates meant that there were many years between 1914 and the 1950s when the guests stayed away. Borrowings from the Cantonal Credit Institution ("Bündner Kreditgenossenschaft") and other financial support organisations failed to preserve the hotel's independence, and in the 1930s it fell into the hands of the Cantonal Bank. This was also the decade during which, in 1936, the hotel acquired its present (2015) name, becoming the "Sporthotel Pontresina".

The 1960s brought a new era of mass tourism, and during the middle of the decade the bank embarked on the hotel's first significant renovation programme in half a century, and the upgrade continued after 1972 when the hotel passed from the ownership of the bank to that of the municipality. Most of the rooms acquired en suite bathrooms, and the modernised conference and meeting rooms together with enhanced facilities for sports equipment storage and drying enabled the hotel to broaden its appeal and provided for a new start. In 2010 the municipality sold the hotel to a new company, "Sporthotel Pontresina AG", owned by the Pampel family.

== Site ==
The hotel is built on a well chosen site, in the centre of Pontresina, directly on the east side what was till 1963/65 the main through route linking St. Moritz with the Bernina Pass and Italy. (Since 1964 a replacement main road on the other side of the little valley has carried the through traffic, and the hotel itself is in a zone where traffic speeds are restricted to 30 km/h.)

Although the three little hamlets that comprised Pontresina have become contiguous, back in 1881 the site of the hotel was a large piece of open ground between the hamlets of Laret and St.Spiert, which provided space for expansion. Expansion directly beside the main street during the 1890s nevertheless involved the acquisition and replacement of neighbouring properties, and the floor-plan of the hotel was further complicated by the slope of the site.

Another advantage of the relatively large plot of land was the opportunity afforded for good views from the hotel and its garden towards the Roseg Valley and Glacier. Because Stoppany's plot extended to the opposite, western, side of the street, no one could block the view with new buildings. At the lower part of the plot it adjoined a road leading towards the Roseg Valley, and there was space in the hotel grounds for stables and a laundry, hidden by the fall of the land from the sight-line of hotel guests, despite their proximity to the main building. In the end the transport infrastructure won, however, with the opening on 1 July 1908 of the branch railway line, and the little street at the lower end of the plot acquired its present name, Station Street (Via da la Staziun / Bahnhofstrasse).

== Chronology ==
=== Background ===
In 1850 Pontresina contained around 270 registered inhabitants, living from agriculture and welcoming the occasional traveller approaching the little used Bernina Pass. Early in the nineteenth century reconstruction/rediscovery of the Julier, Maloja and Albula Passes, which since the end of the Roman Empire had become mere bridle paths, marked a lessening of the isolation of the Engadin. The Swiss postal service was founded in 1848 and inaugurated a stagecoach service providing, for the first time, a regularly operated transport network. The development was associated with a tourism surge. Early beneficiaries were Tarasp and St. Moritz, two resorts able to boast spa facilities, and it was in these two resorts that the first new hotels in the Engadin region were built.

The first visitors mostly came because their doctors had recommended a health cure, but these were soon joined by more recreational travellers. From about 1850 there was a rapid growth in mountaineering as a leisure activity. Pioneering mountain tourists, many of whom came from England, favoured Pontresina over St. Moritz as a starting point for their Engadin climbing holidays. The first edition of 's "Piz Languard Und Die Bernina-gruppe Bei Pontresina, Oberengadin" appeared in 1858. In this early tour guide the parish priest for St. Moritz and Samedan described the hiking and mountaineering tours in a wide area around Pontresina. The local "Improvement Association" ("Verschönerungsverein") was founded in 1872 and by the 1890s had laid out a network of paths and riding tracks extending to more than 80 km (50 miles). The routes were given euphonous names such as "Schluchtenpromenade", "Thaispromenade" or "Flazpromenade" and their total cost was recorded as 35,151 Swiss francs.

Visitors were accommodated in simple guest houses such as the "Wirtschaft zur Krone" (which subsequently morphed into the "Grand Hotel Kronenhof"), and often also in rented rooms in the homes of private individuals. From 1870 sustained demand for accommodation led to a hotels building boom, and by 1890 a number of hotels lined the main street (Via Maistra), as they do today.

=== Hotel Pontresina and Post (1881) ===
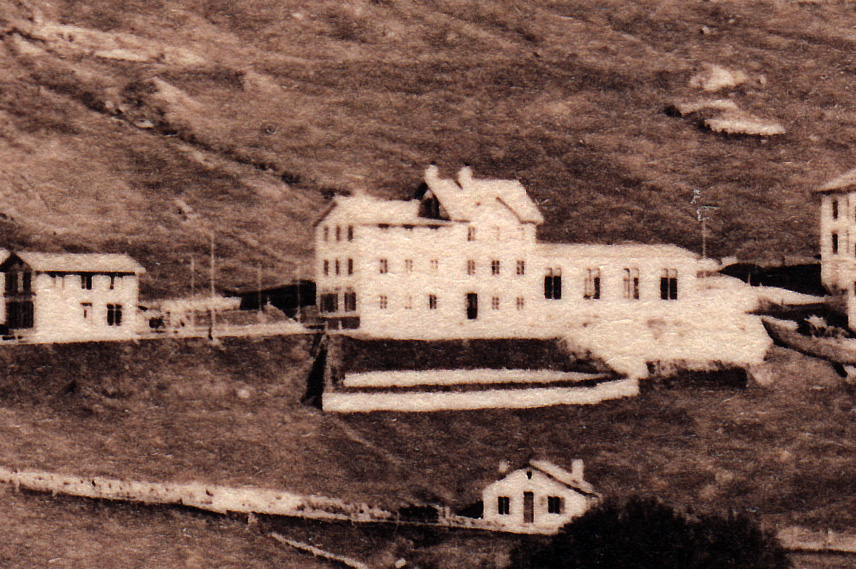
Construction of the Hotel Pontresina & Post (1880) On left of the block is the former Photographic shop recently acquired from Alexander Flury. In the centre is what till now had been the "Maison Stiffler" guesthouse. To the right, the ground floor of the four floor extension on the southern end of the site has already been built.

Most of the many hotels in Pontresina were either constructed as purpose-built or else the result of a change of use for an existing house. The Sporthotel Pontresina's structure results from a more convoluted and iterative series of steps. The hotel that opened in 1881 still, in most respects, comprised at its heart the old "Maison Stiffler" guest house, which itself dated back only to 1866, but the architect brothers Ragaz also integrated into the overall building the previously separate photographic shop acquired from the photographer, named Alex Flury. On the ground floor of the former photographic shop the hotelier Stoppany installed Pontresina's (second) post station, to generate customers for the hotel and its restaurant.

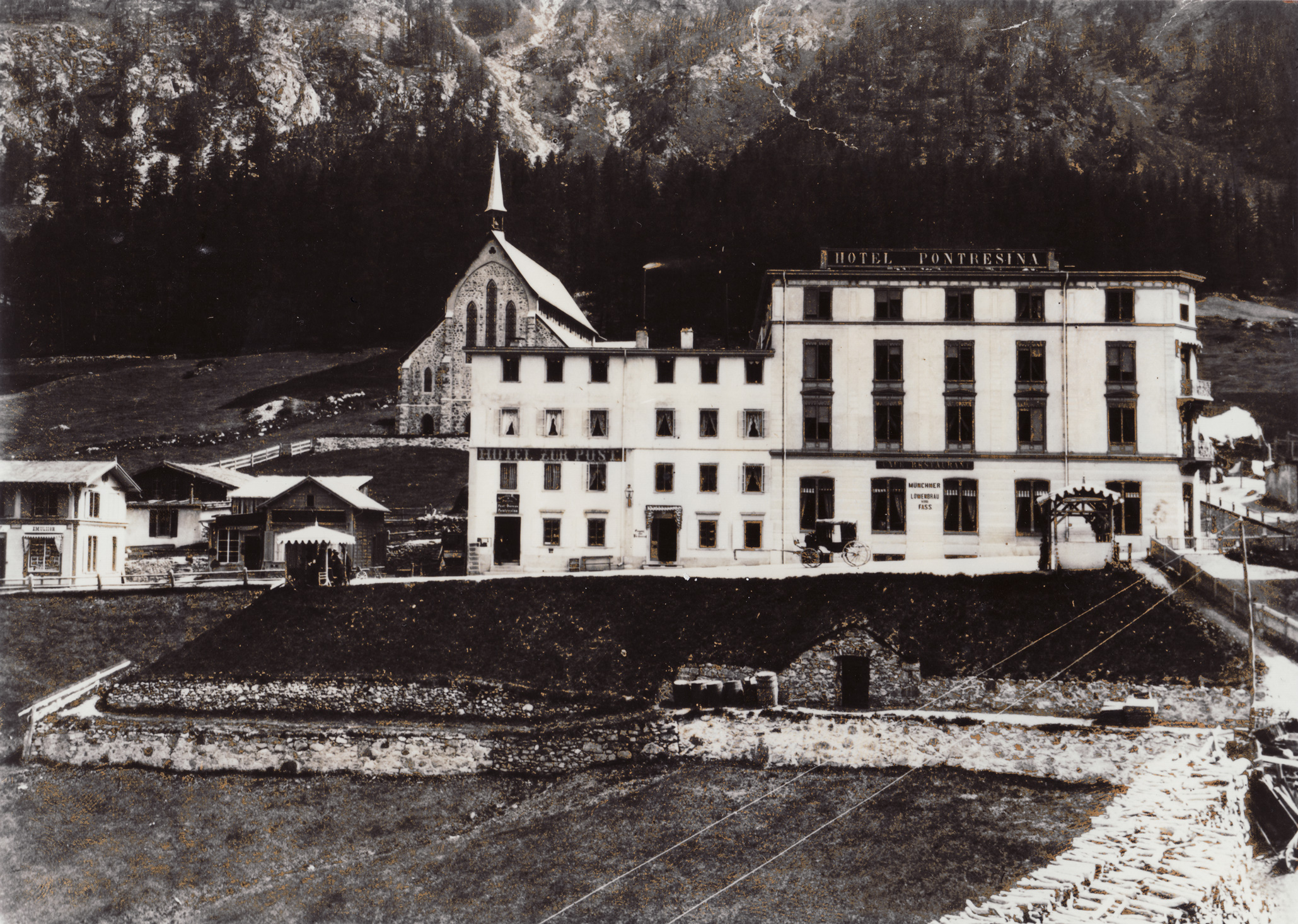
The Hotel Pontresina after the 1881 rebuild (now with the new church behind it). (ca. 1885)

The architects designed a new unifying facade for the combined buildings and added an extra floor on the top of what had been the Maison Stiffler, resulting in a four-storey building. With the traditional "Post Hotel" ("Hotel Post") nomenclature and an increased number of relatively basic rooms this part of the hotel provided a suitable overnight halt for stage coach passengers and other guests with simple requirements.

The fourth floor extension on the main building applied a simplified reading of the Renaissance Revival style, its flat roof topped off with a large "Hotel Pontresina" sign. Its significantly greater height caused it to tower above the less flamboyantly restyled building beside it. The embellishment elements of the five-section front facade were mostly formed of wood, sheet metal and zinc castings, coated in stone coloured paint. The ground floor contained the reception area and the restaurant, which was open to passing trade as well as to hotel guests not wishing to spend time and money on a bit meal (so eating "à la carte"). At the back of the building the ground floor also incorporated the kitchens for the restaurant and hotel. Upstairs, the more expensive guest rooms were on the first and second floors, benefitting from the large windows conferred by the remodelled facade on the building's western (front) face, which provided views over the road towards the Roseg valley and glacier. The two corner rooms were particularly coveted, thanks to the small balconies emerging from the bevelled corner shape of the building. The more modest top floor rooms were provided for guests with less demanding requirements and for the servants accompanying some of the more affluent guests. The 1881 extension left the hotel with a capacity of around 66 beds.

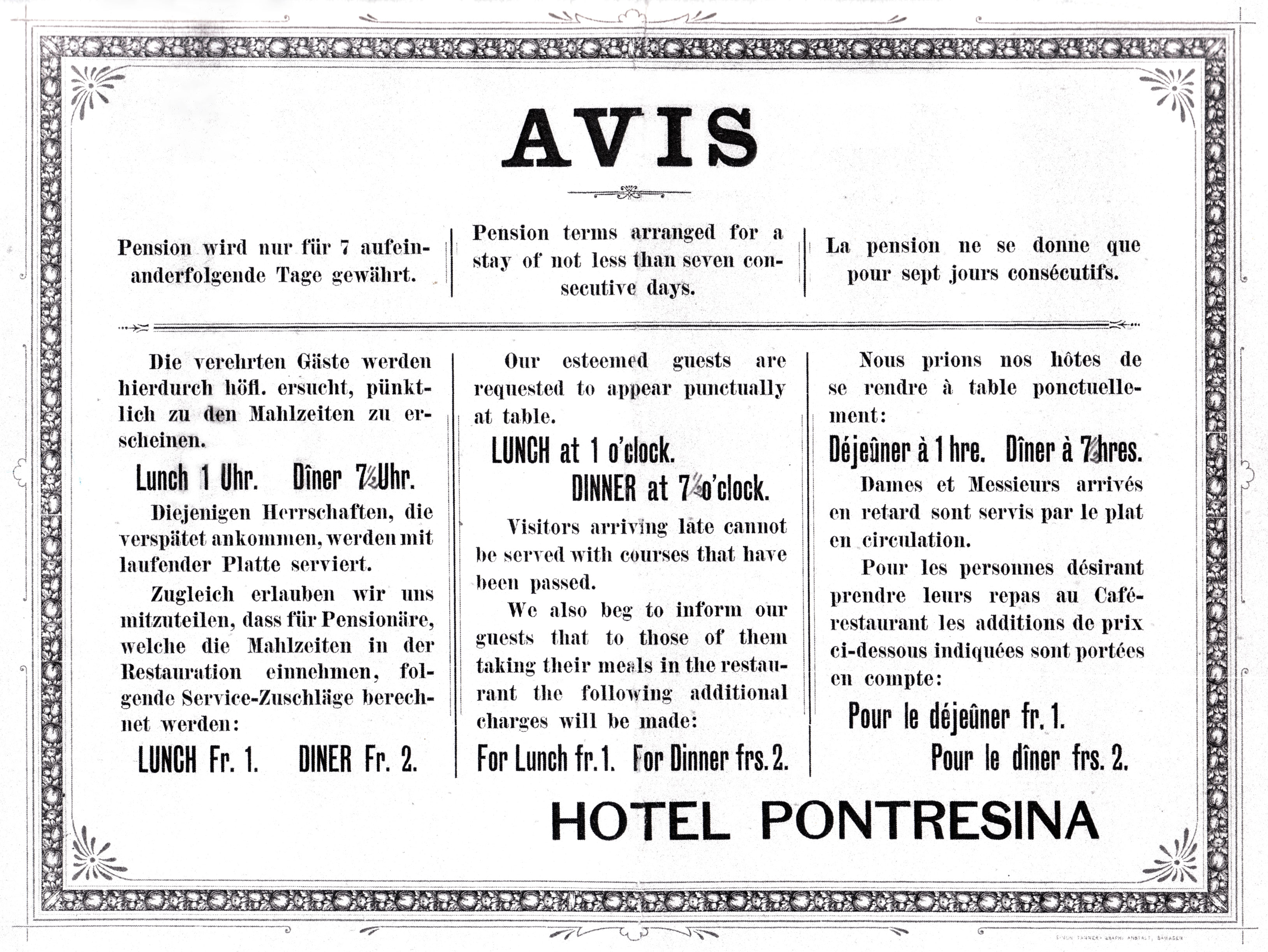
Guests were politely but firmly informed - here in three languages - that when they arrived late they would miss out on those courses that had already been served. The middle column, in English, includes the injunction: Our esteemed guests are requested to appear punctually at table.: Lunch at 1 o'clock; -- Dinner at 7½ o'clock Visitors arriving late cannot be served with courses that have been passed.

On the western face of the building, close to the mountainside, the grand dining room was positioned above the kitchen on the first floor. Its height encompassed both the first and second floors. Guests eating here benefitted from a multi-course menu, albeit without being able to select individually the dishes they wished to be served. Most guests dined at the long banquet style table (the "Table d’hôte"). Main meals were served at fixed times - 13.00 and 19.30 - and guests were politely but firmly informed that when they arrived late they would miss out on those courses that had already been served. ("Herrschaften, die verspätet ankommen, werden mit laufender Platte servier'".) For a supplementary payment of 1 Swiss franc (lunch) or 2 Swiss francs (dinner) guests could elect to be served not at the shared long table but at separately assigned small tables.

The original painted ceiling of the grand dining room is today hidden behind a painted plaster ceiling. Separated and hidden, in a hidden mezzanine gallery, was the storage location for the hotel silver, plates and dishes, together with heated hotplates and centre pieces for the tables and other elements appropriate to the quality of the guests and their formal meals at the "Table d’hôte". Above the dining room, on the fourth floor, there were more of the modest hotel rooms, similar to those on the fourth floor at the front of the building.

Individual private guest bathrooms, even in the most exclusive hotels, were not usual in Europe in the 1880s. Each floor had a grouping of washrooms and wcs, more than sufficient for the number of bedrooms, beside the main staircase. If a guest wished to take a bath a zinc bathtub would be produced and placed in the guest's bedroom, and filled with water by hotel staff using jugs, in a manner that would have reflected the arrangements in the homes of the more affluent guests. Although there was at this stage no plumbed water supply to the guest bedrooms, for basic personal ablution, urination and defecation, rooms were provided with their own jugs, basins and night chamber pots. The hotel still retains a few porcelain examples, inscribed with the prestigious names of their manufacturers Brown-Westhead, Moore & Co and Villeroy & Boch.

Electric lighting was already installed by 1891. Guests prepared to pay a supplement were even able to specify electric lighting for their bedrooms in place of the more conventional (and dimmer) candle lighting.

Across the main street guests could use the hotel terrace, with views of the hotel gardens sloping away towards the mountain stream flowing through the resort and higher, up across to the Roseg valley. Beneath the terrace was a cellar, used for storage, and accessible from the main hotel cellar using a tunnel under the main street. Two wooden pavilions enabled guests to sit and enjoy the gardens while protected from sun and rain.

=== Hotel Pontresina (1895) ===
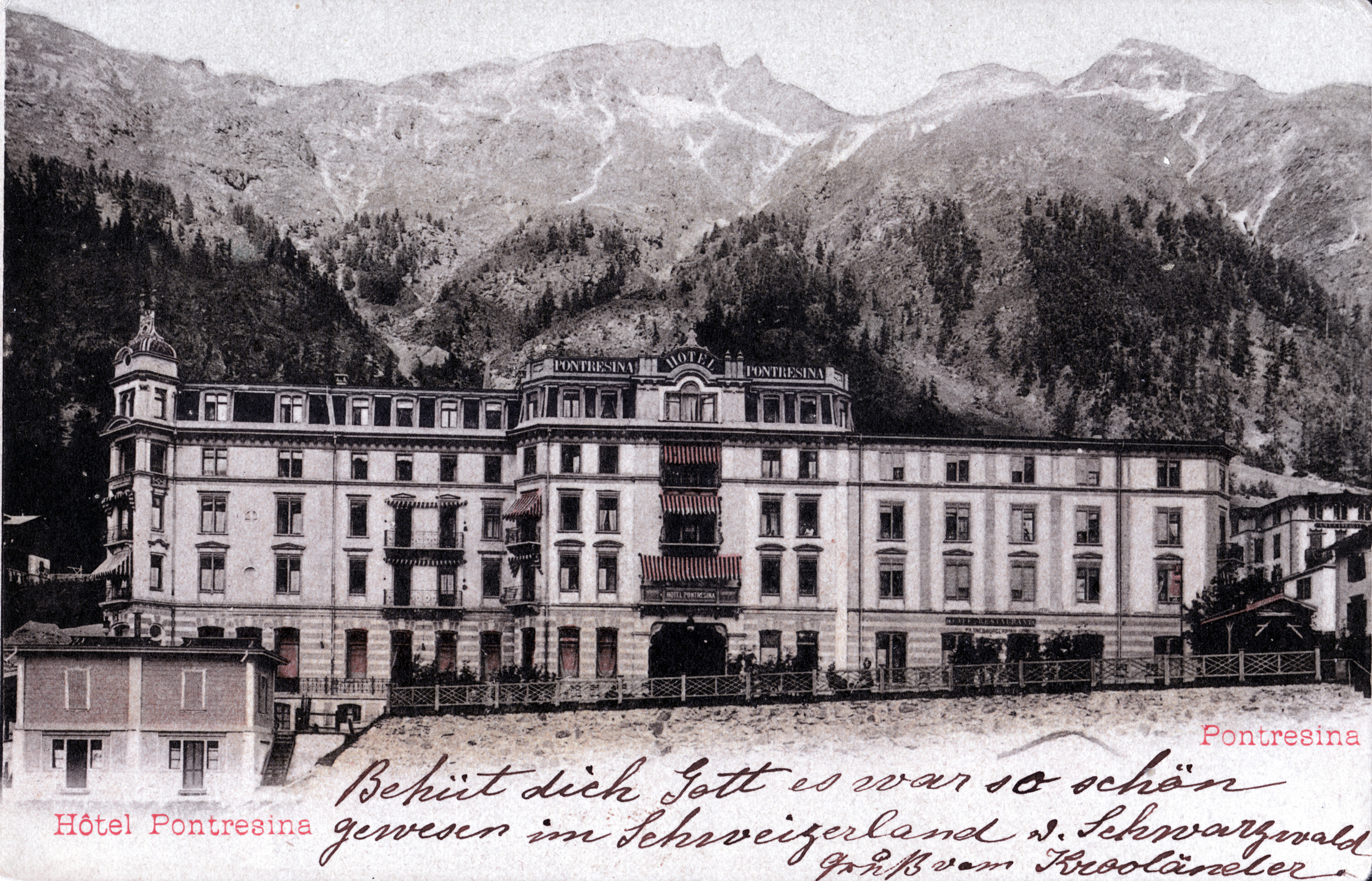
Hotel Pontresina (ca. 1900)

Commercial success permitted Stoppany to enlarge his hotel in 1895. The rebuild provided for a capacity increase to 150 rooms with 200 beds. Guests had also become more demanding in terms of creature comforts since 1880: the Hotel Pontresina of 1895 was able to compete on equal terms at the top end of the market with recently constructed or renovated rival establishments in Pontresina and St. Moritz.

For the planning, Florian Stoppany again employed the architect Jakob Ragaz. What had been the "new extension" on the southern end of the building, back in 1881, was retained, and a new northern wing was now joined to it, replacing the old "Maison Stiffler" guest house and former photographer's shop. The greater overall symmetry of the resulting structure made for an imposing contemporary palace-style hotel. The replacement of the "Hotel Post" portion of the old building also triggered a name change: now the hotel was known simply as the "Hotel Pontresina". Within his enlarged hotel Stoppany was no keen able to accommodate the postal and communications facilities, and these were repositioned in 1894/95 to a new purpose built post office at Via Maistra 160, on a readily identifiable site across the road 50 m (160 ft) to the south, marked today (2015) by the current "Hotel Post".

The architect Ragaz again chose the Renaissance Revival style, which balanced the 1881 extension. However, a more ornate interpretation was adopted, respecting fashion changes during the intervening fifteen years. All parts of the building were placed securely on a single four sided basement. Because of the slope of the land the northern portion of the building was given an additional floor beneath the level of the main first floor but above the basement section. The roofline from the middle section followed the line of the existing attic windows as did the curved lintels over the palladian-style windows. Facing the street on the building's western side, above front facade and the central lintel, in very large letters, was written "Pontresina−Hotel−Pontresina".

The side facades on the southern and northern ends were now much more impressive. The 1881 extension had featured balconies for the corner rooms on the first and second floors, but now most of the first and second floor rooms incorporated a window with its own small balcony, even on the building's north face. Other ornamentation included little round niches, containing small Swiss crosses, reflecting the increasingly assertive nationalism of the age. The streetside beveled corners of the hotel building were built out, first on the northwest corner and subsequently on the southwest corner, and topped off with little crowned domes. The large western facade facing the main street was repositioned a little away from the road, making space for a terrace between the public street and the hotel's public rooms. It was no longer necessary for guests to cross the road in order to sit on the hotel terrace and watch the traffic and bustle along the increasingly busy road to the Bernina Pass, beyond which the more distant view across to the Roseg Valley, its glacier, and the surrounding mountains remained for most purposes unimpaired.

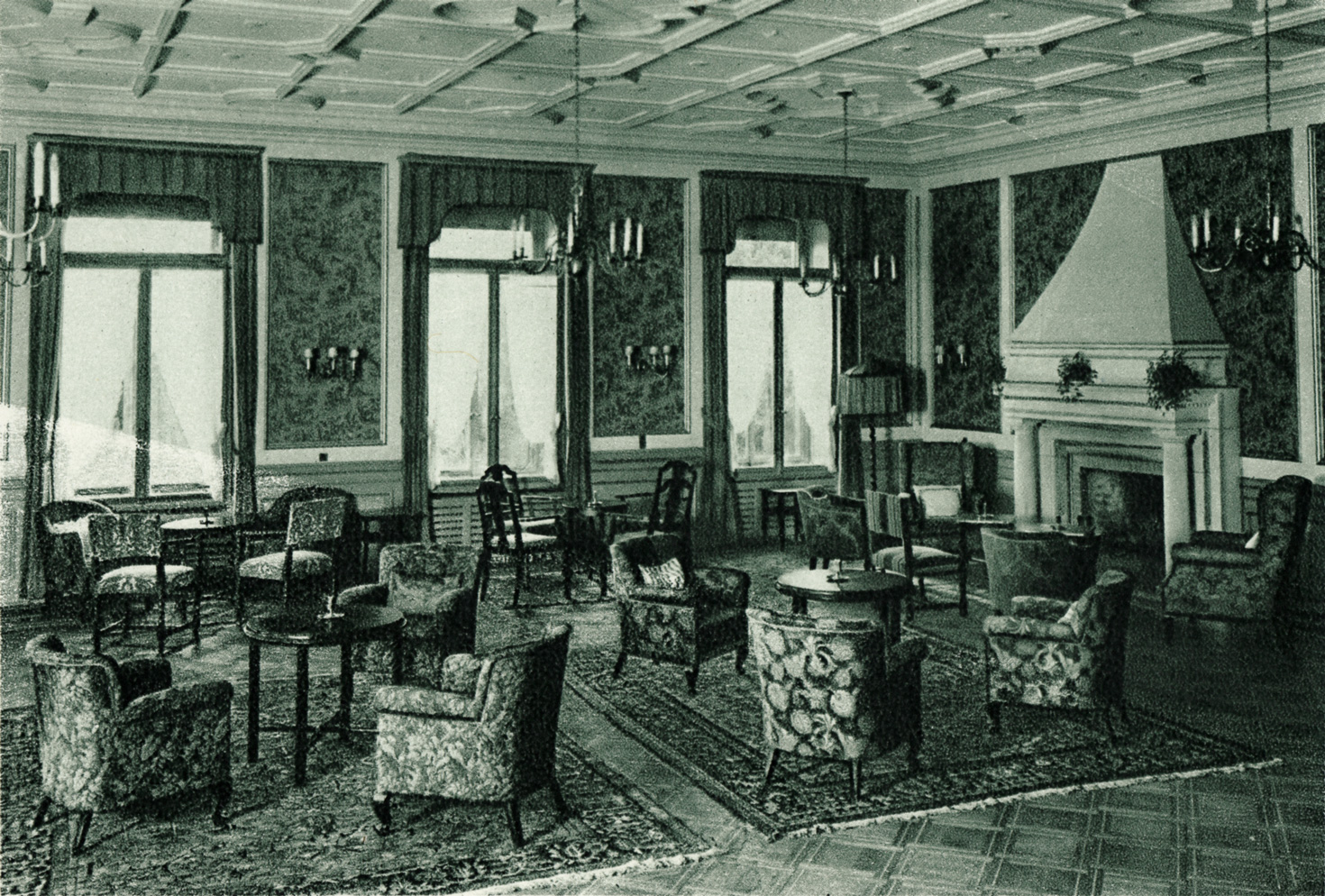
The hall-lounge with the fireplace to the right (ca. 1910)

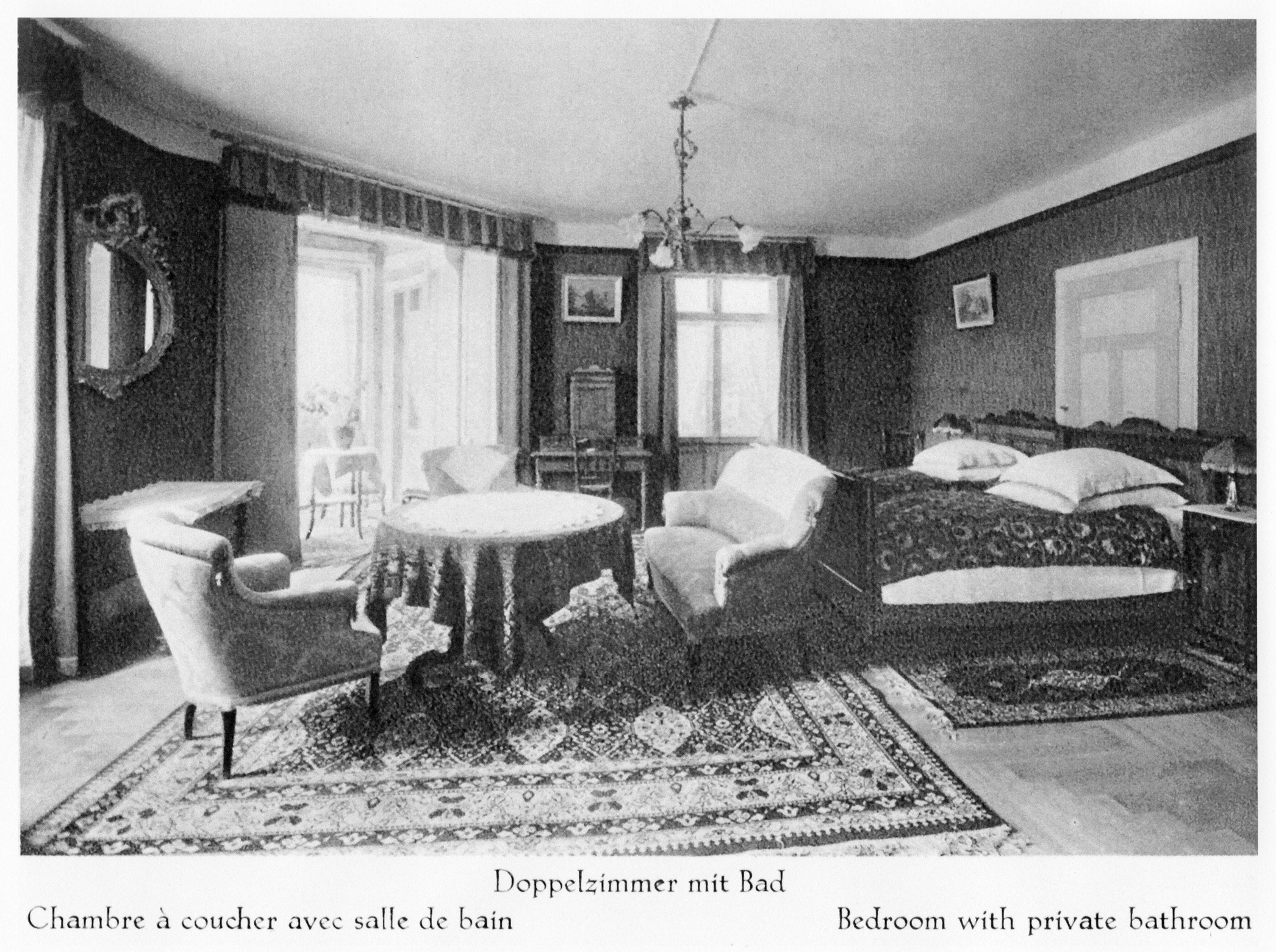
The corner rooms were as large as the best rooms in the hotel and could be booked with exclusive use of an adjacent bathroom (but they were slightly further than the best rooms from the lift/elevator) (ca. 1910)

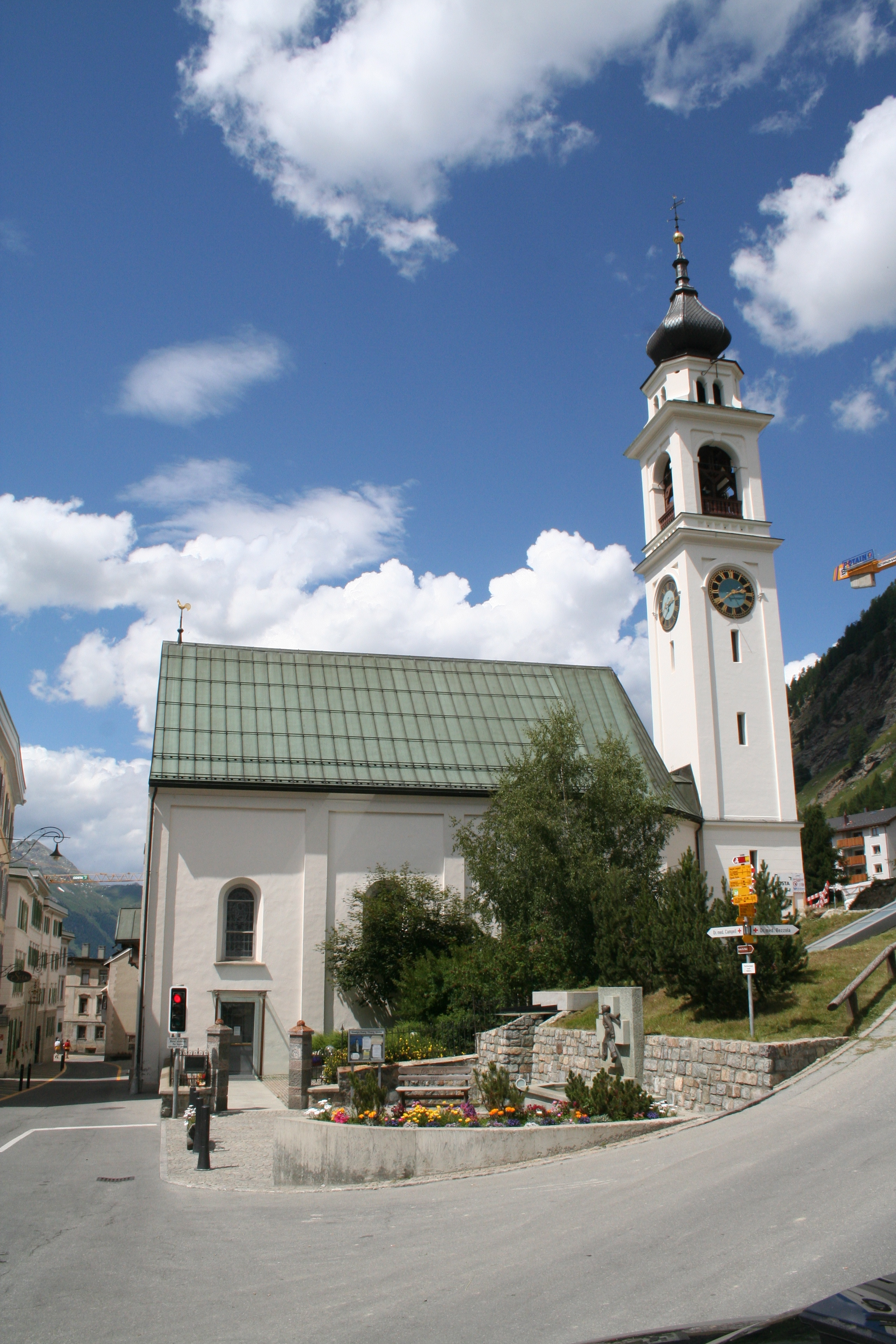
the view for guests with rooms on the north side of the hotel featured the Church of San Niculò (2009)

During the final decades of the nineteenth century there had been a trend for an enlargement of public spaces where hotel guests could meet and interact socially, and Ragaz now incorporated these trends in his enlarged ground floor design, with a large new vestibule, extending across the entire width of the central part of the structure, placed beside the existing (since 1881) restaurant. Other "public" rooms accessible to guests included a bar, a writing room, a substantial shop space (described in the architect's plan a "bank") and even, at the northern end of the building, a room designated in the architect's plan for "ping-pong". The large vestibule was dominated by an impressive wrought iron staircase, while the former main staircase at the southern end of the building was now designated as "side-staircase". There was another "side-staircase" towards the hotel's northern end. Each of the side-staircases had two wcs positioned beside them, while the in pride of place, positioned by the new main staircase, there was now a lift (elevator), adumbrating a trend that would become mainstream in European luxury hotels after 1900.

The hotel manager's own office was positioned to the right of the main entrance on the hotel's western face, mirroring the position of the guests' writing room to the left of the entrance. In anticipation of intensive footfall, the entire vestibule was given a tiled floor (today covered over with a carpet) using the "Mettlacher Platten" (Mettlach process tiles) developed by Jean Boch-Buschmann (1782-1858) and supplied by Villeroy & Boch.

To the left of the vestibule, the front half of the new northern wing was, on the ground floor, entirely occupied by a large hall-lounge. At one end of this area, beside the vestibule and separated from the rest of the hall by glass doors and a glass partition, was the hotel library, comprising more than 300 volumes, kept in a large wall mounted glass fronted bookcase. At the heart of the room, on its eastern side, was the fireplace. Elsewhere clusters of arm chairs and sofas were grouped around low tables. The walls were coated in fabric and the hall featured parquet flooring. The adjacent games room, allocated in the architect's drawing to "ping-pong", has at different times been used as a billiards room and as a bridge (card game) room.

On the right side of the vestibule, the restaurant and bar in front half of the 1881 southern wing were unchanged. In the southwestern corner the former reception area was replaced by a shop space, identified in the architect's plan as a "bank". On the far side of the building, the enlargement of the hotel called for an extension to the grand dining room: this was extended to the south, raising its capacity by approximately 50%. Two broad arched windows on what had previously been the external southern wall of the room were adapted as arches connecting the new and old parts of the enlarged dining room.

Upstairs, in the new northern wing the rooms layouts on the first, second and third floors were virtually identical. Rooms were lined up on either side of a single corridor, which on the western (street) side of the building was broader, but divided by the atrium, a shared bathroom, the enclosed northern side-staircase and the lift/elevator. The corridor turned through 90 degrees at the north-western corner of the building and the corridor along the north side of the building had rooms on each side. During the 1890s en-suite bathrooms were still very unusual, but in the 1895 design for the Hotel Pontresina there were a few bathrooms placed between some of the bedrooms, connected by inter-connecting doors, which could be reserved to just one or two of the adjacent guest rooms according to which of the interconnecting doors were made available and which were locked. Although there was still no question of individual bathrooms for each of the guest rooms, the ratio of bathrooms and wcs to guest rooms was very much more generous than the 1:20 (bathrooms) and 1:8 (wcs) recommended in the newly updated (1894 edition) "Architecture Handbook"

The best rooms, both on account of their size and because of the view across the valley to the Roseg glacier, were in the middle part of the building on its front/west facing facade. Importantly, these were close to the lift/elevator, and could be offered with exclusive use of adjacent bathrooms. There were three of these rooms on each floor, positioned contiguously, and the central one of the three could be redesignated as a private "salon" attached to the adjacent bedroom. For larger parties, by issuing the keys for the appropriate communicating doors it was also possible to convert a group of three adjacent rooms into an apartment of three large rooms with its own bathroom. The flexibility available from issuing guests with keys enabling them to use communicating doors connecting to an adjacent guest room or bathroom was not restricted to the large rooms on the hotel's western face. The same adaptations could be made in respect of the smaller less expensive rooms facing north or south along, the building's north wing, but the view to the north featured no glaciers. Instead, guest looking out from these rooms could observe the reformed-evangelical Church of San Niculò, the hamlet-district of Pontersina-Laret, and on the horizon above and beyond these, the Piz Julier (mountain).

Following the 1895 rebuild, all the rooms incorporated electric lighting. The electricity came from a generator in the cellar.

=== Boom and bubble (1901-1914) ===
The hotel founder Florian Stoppany died on 25 January 1901. His wife had died five years earlier. Direction of the hotel passed to his eldest son, Johann Stoppany, and after 1906 his siblings' shares in the hotel were transferred to Johann. The siblings nevertheless remained active in the hospitality business. His eldest sister married a man called Christian Kuoni-Stoppany, and together in 1903 they took over the Grand Hotel Miramar in Santa Marherita on the Ligurian coast. In 1908 the second brother took over the new Station Restaurant in Pontresina, running it till after the First World War.

In 1901 the Hotel Pontresina was connected to the power grid. The existing electricity power generation set-up, which had been installed in 1891 was no longer needed, and records accordingly show the sale of two petrol (gasoline) powered DC generators, each rated at 7 hp and producing 40 amps at 120 volts. An accumulator battery and a circuit board were also sold off at this point.

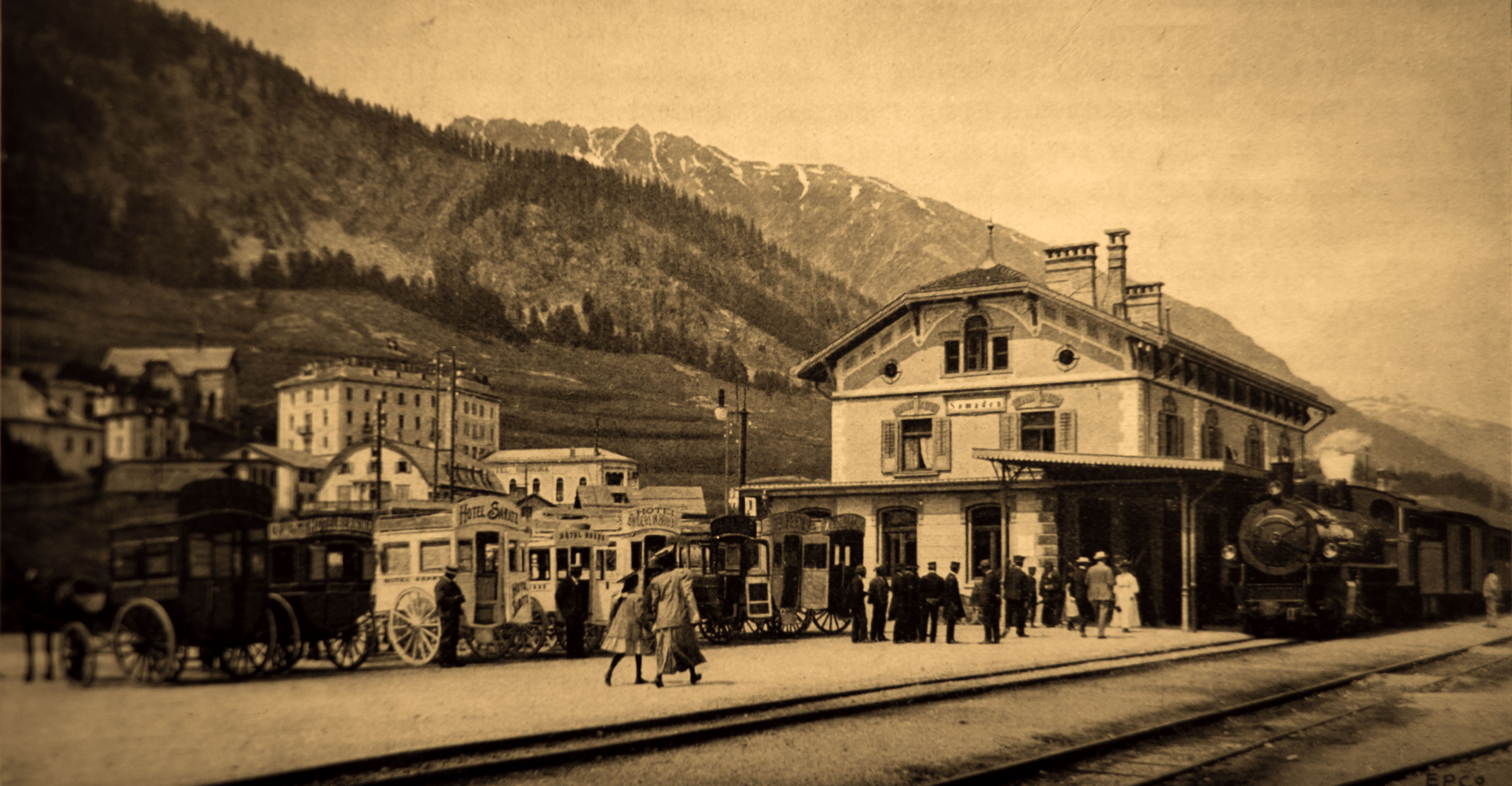
Hotel buses awaiting guests at Samedan railway station 1907

Technical progress also impacted transport links. On 1 July 1903 the Albula Railway opened between Thusis and Samedan, which connected the Engadin region with the cantonal capital, Chur. Hitherto hotel guests had been required to undergo a ten-hour journey, normally by post carriage, via the Julier or Albula Pass in order to reach Pontresina from Chur. That ten hour post carriage journey was now replaced with a four-hour railway journey. At Samedan Station trains were met by the Hotel Pontresina's own horse-drawn omnibus for the final 6 km (4 mile) climb up the valley to Pontresina. It was exactly another five years before the branch line passing through Pontresina opened, on 1 July 1908, in the process linking the Albula railway to the Bernina railway and creating a through route to Tirano in Italy.

A more rapid and, especially in Winter, more predictable transport link brought an increase in tourist numbers. In response, there was a sudden increase in tourist facilities, including a number of substantial new hotels, in Pontresina. Another result and driver of the tourism boom was the Funicular service that opened in 1907 between Punt Muragl and the new Muottas Muragl viewing station, part completed even before the Pontresina rail link itself. Existing hotels originally constructed to operate during the summer season now embarked on upgrades in order to accommodate a winter season clientele as well, in order to service more reliably the debt incurred to finance their construction. The Hotel Pontresina participated in this development.

Since the 1891 enlargement, 16 of the hotel's 66 guest rooms had been provided with their own wood-burning stoves. Guests accommodated in these rooms were billed for using the stoves according to the number of crates of fire wood consumed. However, the room stoves were only ever intended to compensate for short episodes of cold weather, and it would not have been considered practical to operate them on a sustained basis through a winter season. For the 1906/07 winter season, therefore, a central heating system was installed, which was then extended in 1913. New elaborate illustrated brochures were produced, with French and English language versions together with the German ones, in order to draw in more hotel guests for the winter season. New or expanded activities available included skiing, tobogganing, skijoring, ice skating and excursions by horse sled.

Further innovations designed to build a winter season business included a programme of dances and costume balls arranged by the larger hotels, including the Hotel Pontresina, advertised both to their own guests and to guests of other Pontresina hotels. In January 1913 one of the balls was held as a celebration of the German Kaiser's birthday. Something of an experiment, in the view of at least one contemporary reporter, was the introduction of the "Tango Tea party" at the Hotel Pontresina on 27 December 1913.

Despite growth in tourist numbers, there are suggestions that the pace of new hotel construction at times outstripped demand. In 1890 there were 1,200 recorded hotel beds in Pontresina. That increased to 1,530 in 1900 and 1,850 in 1910. Significant new openings included that of the "Hotel Schweizerhof" in 1905 and of the "Hotel Palace" (today the "Hotel Walther") in 1907. 1908 saw the expansion of the hitherto insignificant, in capacity terms, "Hotel Enderlin", which was relaunched as the "Schlosshotel Enderlin" with a new structure that incorporated an arrestingly eye catching tower. The last significant new hotel in Pontresina before war broke out in 1914 was the "Hotel Rosatsch", built on the plot directly beside the Hotel Pontresina. With their fashionable new architecture - whether inspired by gothic castles or by more homely alpine chalets - and integrated modern facilities, these newly built hotels enjoyed a competitive advantage over the establishments built or extended back in the 1890s.

In the increasingly fevered atmosphere of the period, on 15 July 1909 Johann Stoppany sold the hotel to the newly created "A.-G. Hotel Pontresina" company for a price of 1.06 million Swiss francs. At the same time the new company also spent 0.2 million Swiss francs on buying hotel furniture from the St. Moritzer Bank. Johann Stoppany himself invested 148,000 Swiss francs in 296 shares of the new company, which fell just 4 shares below 50% of its issued share capital. However, the company register discloses that his siblings and other relatives were included among his fellow shareholders. Nevertheless, the new hotel director, Hans Beck, who took over in 1911, was the first director since before 1881 not to be a member of the Stoppany clan.

=== World War I (1914-1918) ===
The outbreak of war at the end of July 1914 abruptly ended Pontresina's hotel boom. Despite Switzerland's political and military neutrality, the country was greatly impacted by the war, especially in respect of those industries, such as high-end tourism, most of whose customers came from countries, such as Germany and England, that were among the leading belligerent powers. The supply of hotel guests dried up and it quickly became clear that the financial survival of Pontresina's hotels was threatened not simply because of the high proportion of running costs that were fixed costs (incurred regardless of occupancy levels), but also because of indebtedness left over from the boom years, as loans fell due for repayment and interest on outstanding balances remained payable.

One rapid response, in December 1914, was the creation by the Cantonal government of the Graubünden Credit Co-operative (Bündner Kreditgenossenschaft), with the objective of preserving intrinsically viable enterprises and minimizing losses of value ("zur Durchhaltung lebensfähiger Unternehmungen und zur Verhinderung des Untergangs bedeutender Werte"). The Credit Co-operative's own capital was subscribed by the local communities affected and banks as well as the hotel businesses themselves and their suppliers. By providing additional subordinated mortgage loans they were able to provide vital additional working capital. Records of subsequent conversion of mortgage loans into share capital show that the Hotel Pontresina was one of the institutions to benefit from these emergency measures.

Support for the hotels sector also came from the federal government, which on 2 November 1915 enacted a so-called "Decree concerning the Protection of the Hotels Industry from the Consequences of the War" ("Verordnung betreffend Schutz der Hotelindustrie gegen die Folgen des Krieges"). This involved a wide-ranging deferral of loan interest and capital repayment, and protection of hotels from foreclosure. However, it also included, in § 27 on obligation clase which became known as the "Hotels Building prohibition", which under most circumstances prohibited both the construction of new hotel buildings and the conversion for use as hotels of existing commercial premises.

Guest lists from the war years make clear the difficulties involved in trying to replace all the foreign guests who were staying away with Swiss guests. Even for the summer season Swiss customers tended to prefer the more competitively priced second and third rank hotels over the luxury establishments such as the Hotel Pontresina, while for the winter seasons during the war years the Pontresina simply remained shut.

=== Postwar austerity (1918-1933) ===
The outbreak of peace brought no dramatic upturn in the hotel's fortunes, and it again remained closed for the 1918/19 winter season. Switzerland was infected by the general European inflation that followed the deficit funding of the war, and the prices surge had an adverse impact on the economic costs of running a business.

There was no return to the freedom of travel that people had been able to take for granted before 1914. In 1911 the Baedeker Guide to Switzerland had advised travelers that they would only need a passport when collecting a registered letter, or when hiking in areas close to the frontiers with France or Italy. After the war travellers to Switzerland from abroad needed not merely a passport but also a visa. The struggle against visa requirements and visa fees became an enduring priority for the "Schweizerische Hotelierverein" ("Swiss Hoteliers' Association") and for its 1918 successor organisation, the "Bündner Hotelierverein".

The Hotel Pontresina had traditionally been particularly focused on guests from Germany and it was the German economy that suffered more than most in the aftermath of war. German Hyperinflation of the early 1920s made Switzerland particularly expensive for Germans, and it was particularly destructive of the economic security of the high spending upper middle classes who had provided most of the German clientele for the Hotel Pontresina before 1914.

On 18 December 1920 the government renewed the "Decree [to protect] ... the Hotels Industry from the Consequences of the War", which it had originally promulgated as an emergency wartime measure. The qualified debt moratorium was thereby sustained, along with the ban on new hotel building which was strictly enforced. In the end, as demand for hotel accommodation showed no sign of returning to prewar levels, a ban on new hotels and on expansion of existing hotels found its way into the standard legal code, with a statute ratified on 16 October 1924, and effective from 1 January 1926. In the meantime the "Schweizerische Hotel-Treuhand-Gesellschaft", established in 1921, in some respects took over where the Graubünden Credit Co-operative left off, providing low interest credit to hotels for renovation and modernisation of existing facilities, notably in response to increased customer expectations regarding bathroom and toilet facilities.

From 1924 guest numbers finally began a slow recovery, benefitting most of the region's hotels, including the Hotel Pontresina. Brochures of the time indicate that management took the opportunity to resume renovations, notably of the public rooms on the ground floor. There is evidence for a growth in popularity with holidaymakers during the 1920s of recreational swimming and bathing, and bathing facilities were made available at Lake Staz and in the surrounding woodlands ("Stazerwald") between Pontresina and St. Moritz.

Despite bitter resistance from some of the canton's more conservative elements, the ban on private motor car usage was grudgingly lifted in the mid 1920s, after which the more prosperous guests, for whom the hotel had been built, increasingly arrived in their own cars. The cantonal ban on private cars had been in force since 1911, at which time car ownership had been limited to a tiny pioneering elite of motoring enthusiasts. It was only during the 1920s that in Germany and Switzerland car ownership accelerated significantly if still, at this stage, rather gently. By this time the tourist industry, including the Hoteliers Association, was lobbying with increasing urgency for the lifting of the ban, but it was not till the tenth referendum on the subject, on 21 June 1921, that the roads of Graubünden were finally opened to private motorists.

The 1929 Wall Street Crash ushered in more years of exacerbated financial hardship across Europe. Germany introduced foreign currency restrictions on its citizens, while both Germany and Great Britain abandoned the Gold Standard in the late summer of 1931. The Swiss franc soared in value against the currencies in which most of the Hotel Pontresina's guests received their incomes: visitor numbers collapsed correspondingly.

=== Financial restructuring (1933) ===
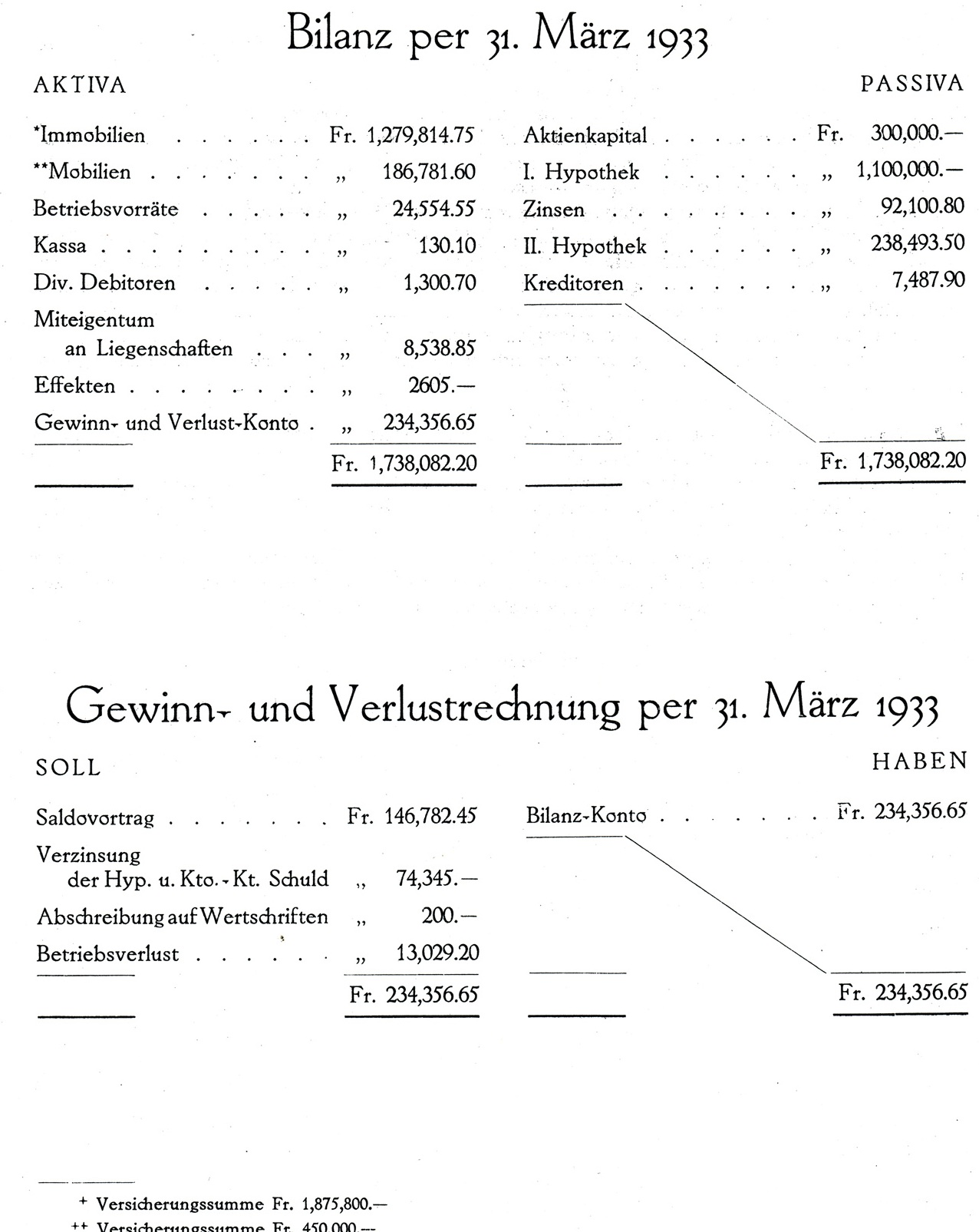
Hotel Pontresina: Balance sheet and 12 month income statement summary reported as at 31 March 1933, before the 1933 financial restructuring

During the twelve months ending 31 March 1933 the accumulated losses of "A.-G. Hotel Pontresina" rose from 146,782 to 234,357 Swiss francs. Accumulated losses now represented more than 80% of the nominal share capital value which had remained at 300,000 Swiss francs since the company had been set up in 1933. Although the income statement for the twelve months ending 31 March 1933 disclosed a significant operating loss, the larger loss was a financial one, in the form of 74,345 Swiss francs of interest expense. Financial restructuring was unavoidable.

The annual general meeting on 5 July 1933 approved a write down of the nominal share capital to 20% of its former value. Investors agreed to exchange five old shares for one new share, still with a nominal value of 500 Swiss francs. New shares with a total value of 40,000 Swiss francs were issued to the cantonal bank in respect of the company's outstanding mortgage debt (which included both a capital element and unpaid interest). The bank agreed to write off 17,800 Swiss francs, and to waive interest for five years on the remaining 35,000 Swiss francs of the mortgage. The practical outcome of the restructuring was that the bank now owned the hotel, holding 114 of the 200 shares that remained following completion of the restructuring. A further 62 of the shares were held by the Cantonal Credit Institution ("Bündner Kreditgenossenschaft"), which had itself been in receivership since 1931, and which later during 1933 itself fell into the hands of the Graubündner Kantonalbank.

=== More financial restructuring and another name change (1934-1939) ===
In March 1934, at the end of the next financial year, Hans Beck retired as hotel director after 23 years, to be succeeded by Hans and Mary Walther. With the German economy beginning to benefit from a cyclical upswing, supported by an ongoing programme of Keynesian stimulus, the Hotel Pontresina found itself operating in a financial environment that was a little more friendly. For the first time in many years, the hotel opened for a winter season in 1934/35. However, the annual report for that year included the observation that during the many years when the Pontresina had remained closed through the winter guests had learned to take their winter holidays in competitor establishments, and the much resulting loss in business must be judged permanent. The interest burden on what was now 1.3 million Swiss francs of mortgage debt remained oppressive, taking more than 40,000 Swiss francs out of the business each year. By the end of the 1935/36 financial year the company had again eten through its share capital. At a General Meeting on 21 October 1936 the controlling shareholder - still the Graubündner Kantonalbank - again accepted a write down the nominal value of the share capital by 80%. The new share capital of 100,000 Swiss francs was provided from a further conversion of mortgage debt (also held by the bank). This second restructuring effectively wiped out the last of the minority share holders, who were left only with Genussscheine ("participation certificates"), while the bank owned all the voting shares apart from the few qualifying shares legally required to be held by board members. The General Meeting also decided to recognise the changed ownership structure with a name change for the hotel which now became the "Sporthotel Pontresina". The new name also provided an eloquent statement of where the hotel would be looking for its clients in the future.

Newspaper reports of a children's polio epidemic during the summer of 1936 effectively wiped out the summer season for the tourist businesses in and beyond Graubünden. However, the authorities finally devalued the Swiss franc on 26 September 1936 which opened the way for a recovery in tourist numbers. The Sporthotel Pontestrina profited from the upswing, and at least for the 1937/38 summer and winter seasons, reported an operating profit.

=== World War II (1939-1945) and aftermath ===
As far as Britain and Germany were concerned, war resumed in September 1939. Switzerland, as in 1914, was politically and militarily neutral, but the countries supplying most of the Hotel Pontresina's guests were not. The Swiss frontiers were closed to holiday traffic in September 1939. Swiss vacationers were no longer able to holiday abroad, and a few of them occupied the hotel rooms that had been emptied by the war, but these, even when supplemented by the use of the hotel for military accommodation, were insufficient, and it proved impossible to keep the hotel open during the winter seasons. Food and fuel were rationed, adding to management difficulties. Only in 1948, three years after the formal end of the war, was rationing of basic consumer goods ended. By this time, just in time for the first post war summer season in 1946, Roman und Marlies Thöndury had taken over at the Sporthotel Pontresina, while their predecessors since 1934, Hans und Mary Walther, had been headhunted (by the Graubündner Kantonalbank which controlled both establishments) to take charge of relaunching Pontresina's "Palace Hotel", where their grandson and his wife still (2015) run what has subsequently been renamed as the "Hotel Walther".

During the late 1940s the presence across the border in southern Germany of large numbers of US military personnel, with disposal incomes useful higher than those available to the European populations, provided the hotels in the Engadin with a welcome additional customer base, but numbers were insufficient to avert a continuation of the Sporthotel's operating losses. Meanwhile, Swiss holidaymakers were again able to take holidays beyond the country's frontiers, although in practice vacationing possibilities in neighbouring countries, devastated as never before by the impact of industrial warfare, were limited.

The widely lauded generosity of the US Marshall Plan dealt a significant blow to the hotel trade in Switzerland by enabling the alpine resorts in neighbouring Austria to rebuild and construct a new generation of hotels, benefitting from generous credit terms not made available in Switzerland, and designed from the start to accommodate a set of operational cost structures and customer preferences that had shifted significantly since the great heyday of Swiss hotel building, during the first fourteen years of the twentieth century. During the 1920s and 1930s the generally lean state of European economies had starved Swiss hotels of funds for investment in modernisation. Around 1950 the shattered economies of western Europe belatedly began to revert to a growth pattern, but where overseas holiday makers felt able to contemplate an alpine holiday, Austrian resorts often presented a more appropriate and less expensive offering than those in Switzerland. The relative strength of the Swiss currency against the German Mark and, especially following a devaluation in September 1949, the British Pound (which still affected several important "Sterling bloc" currency zones in addition to Britain itself), left the Swiss resorts looking even more expensive from the perspective of what had previously been identified by management as key foreign markets. From 1950 intensified pressures also began to emerge, slowly, on the cost front as seasonal hotel workers, traditionally recruited inexpensively from, in particular, Italy, began to find opportunities for more attractively remunerated hotel work at home. During the winter season of 1953/54, the Sporthotel stayed shut, citing staff shortages. Meanwhile, a boom in hotel building in Italy and Spain also encouraged clients whose parents might have chosen an Alpine holiday back in the 1930s to opt, instead, for a more competitively priced Mediterranean beach holiday in the later 1950s.

The ban on building additional hotel accommodation, introduced from Bern in 1915 as an emergency response to overcapacity created by the pre-1914 building boom, continued in force in a succession of modified forms for more than three decades, but a further extension of it was rejected by national referendum on 2 March 1952, after which it was finally lifted. Although it was the national decision that the legislators were required to respect, within the canton of Graubünden a large majority of participating citizens had actually voted to perpetuate the ban further, presumably reflecting concerns over possible adverse economic consequences locally of a renewed increase in hotel beds nationally.

=== Bank exit and hotel rebirth (1963-1971) ===
In 1963, finally, the Cantonal Bank decided that the Sporthotel had no longterm commercial future, and "Sporthotel Pontresina AG" was placed in liquidation. On 17 August 1963 the cantonal land registry recorded a change in ownership in respect of the hotel building. The next year a new owner invested new money in a major renovation exercise. The 1913 central heating installation was replaced in 1965. The south wing, the oldest part of the hotel, was extensively reconfigured and the number of guest rooms was reduced through the substitution on the first and second floors of two large apartments. Further upgrades took place in 1967, with an increase in the number of guest rooms permanently incorporating their own en suite bathroom facilities. The large retail space at the southern end of the front facade, which had for some decades accommodated a branch of the Graubündner Kantonalbank, was rebuilt as a sports goods shop using a plan by the architect Otto Kober, opening in 1971, while the bank branch had already been relocated, in 1970, to a newly constructed extension attached to the "Hotel Schweizerhof".

=== Modern times (1972-date) ===
In 1972 the Cantonal Bank cut residual commercial ties with the Sporthotel which was sold to the Pontresina municipality. Restoration work continued, focusing in 1973 on a major reconstruction of the north wing. At the end of the 1973 summer season the directorship of Roman und Marlies Thöndury came to an end, after more than a quarter century. Their successors, Ralph und Monika Schweizer, remained in post between 1973 and 1980. During this period, in 1974, HotellerieSuisse selected the Sporthotel Pontresina as its first "training hotel" ("Schulungshotel"). This means that twice each year, always during the spring and autumn off-peak season, the hotel is used for five week blocks of study during which aspiring hotel professionals receive a combination of theoretical and hands-on training, based on rules set down by the Swiss Ministry for Economics (Staatssekretariat für Wirtschaft / Secrétariat d’Etat à l’économie / SECO), applying real-life conditions, managed by the trainees themselves. The original driving force behind the initiative was the Graubünden branch of the Swiss Hoteliers Association, but the idea has taken hold and today the Sporthotel Pontresina is one of four hotels in Switzerland used for these off-peak block training courses. The others are in Interlaken (BE) and Les Diablerets (VD).

== See also ==
- List of hotels in Switzerland
- Tourism in Switzerland
