= Piz Grevasalvas =

Mountain in Switzerland

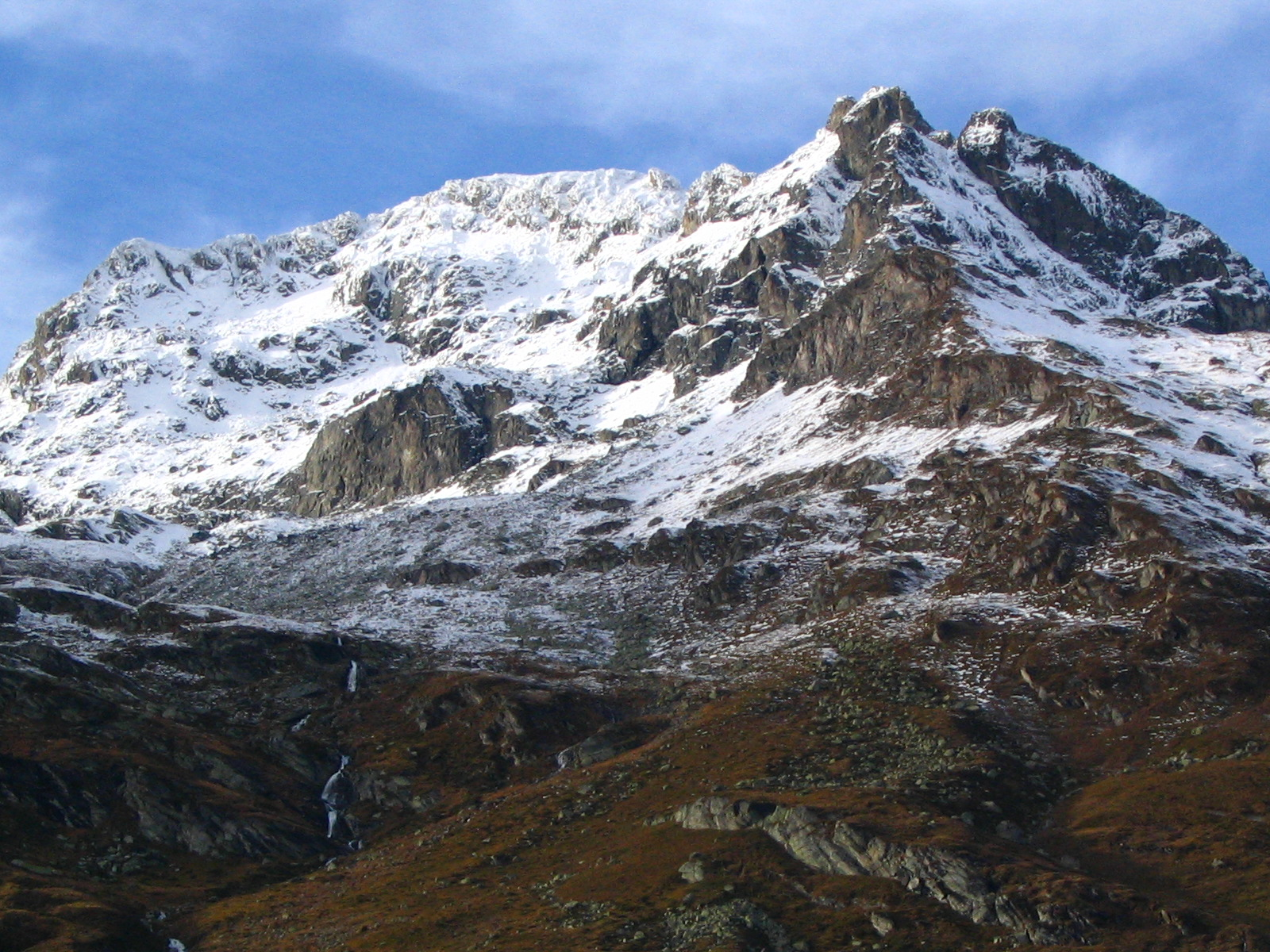
- View from the south side

Highest point
- Elevation: 2,932 m (9,619 ft)
- Prominence: 141 m (463 ft)
- Parent peak: Piz Materdell
- Coordinates: 46°25′22.1″N 9°40′26.9″E

Geography
- Location within Switzerland
- Location: Graubünden, Switzerland
- Parent range: Albula Alps

Piz Grevasalvas is a mountain of the Albula Alps, located north of Maloja in the canton of Graubünden. It lies on the range between the Julier Pass and Lake Sils.
