= Julier =

Julier, meaning "Julia's", may refer to one of the following

- Places in Switzerland:
  - Julier Pass
  - Piz Julier
