= Piz Polaschin =

Mountain in Switzerland

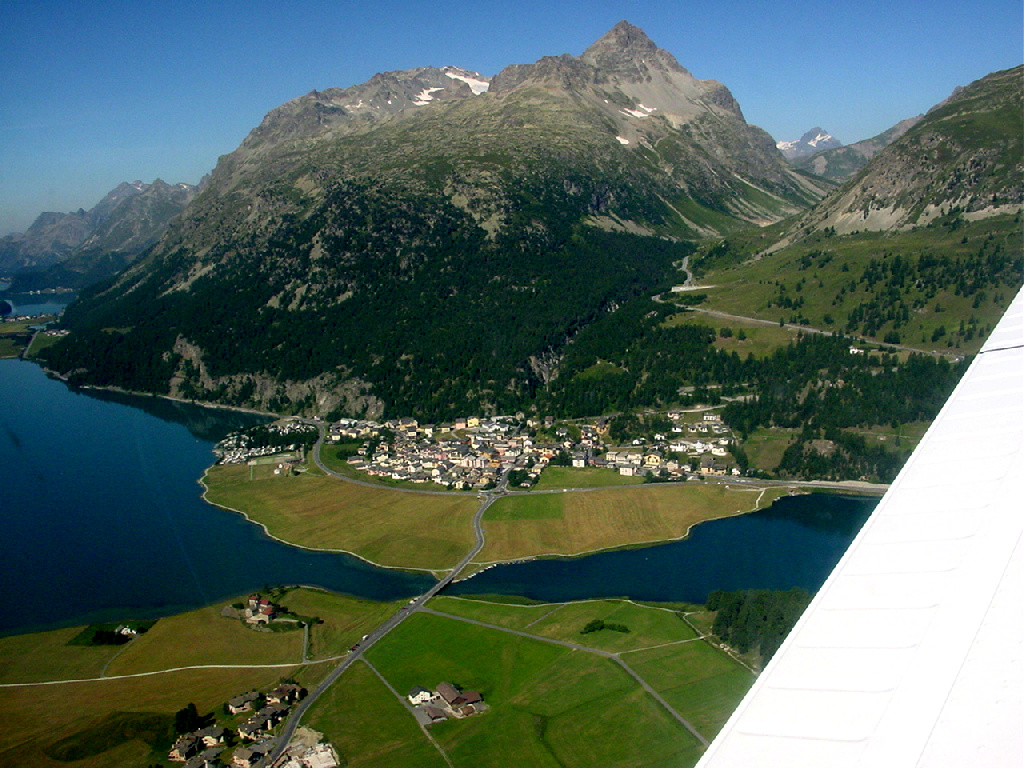
- Piz Polaschin (centre right) and Lake Silvaplana

Highest point
- Elevation: 3,013 m (9,885 ft)
- Prominence: 215 m (705 ft)
- Parent peak: Piz Lagrev
- Coordinates: 46°27′39″N 9°45′10″E

Geography
- Location within Switzerland
- Location: Graubünden, Switzerland
- Parent range: Albula Alps

Piz Polaschin (3,013 m) is a mountain of the Albula Alps, overlooking Silvaplana in the canton of Graubünden, Switzerland. It lies east of Piz Lagrev, on the range south of the Julier Pass.

It is a popular destination for experienced hikers and mountaineers, offering panoramic views over the Upper Engadin valley, the surrounding peaks of the Albula and Bernina ranges, and the lakes of Silvaplana, Sils, and St. Moritz. The ascent typically begins from the village of Silvaplana or from the Julier Pass road, following marked trails that lead through alpine meadows and rocky terrain. In summer, the summit can be reached without technical climbing equipment, though sure-footedness is required, while in winter and spring it is also visited by ski tourers. The area is part of the Rhaetian Alps and is known for its rich flora and fauna, with marmots, ibex, and a variety of alpine flowers common along the route.
