= GKB =

GKB may refer to:

- Good Karma Brands, an American radio broadcaster
- Graubündner Kantonalbank, a Swiss cantonal bank
- GKB Associates, founded by Greta Berlin
- Union of Young Communists (Turkish: Genç Komünistler Birliği), the youth wing of the Revolutionary Communist Party of Turkey
