= Piz Materdell =

Mountain in Switzerland

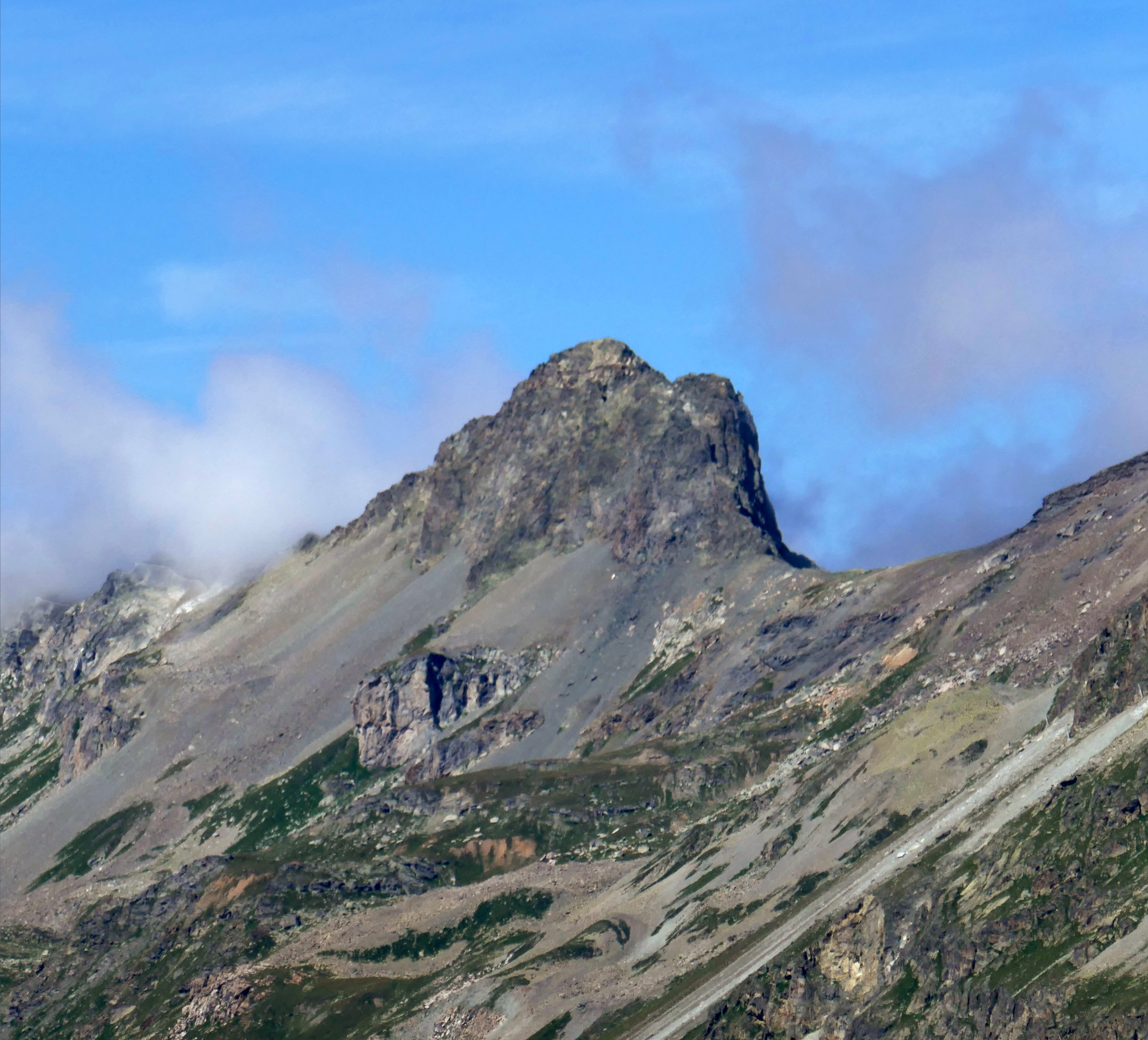

Highest point
- Elevation: 2,967 m (9,734 ft)
- Prominence: 279 m (915 ft)
- Parent peak: Piz Lagrev
- Coordinates: 46°26′8″N 9°41′37″E

Geography
- Location within Switzerland
- Location: Graubünden, Switzerland
- Parent range: Albula Alps

Piz Materdell (2,967 m) is a mountain of the Albula Alps, overlooking Lake Sils in the canton of Graubünden. It lies on the range between the Septimer Pass and the Julier Pass, which culminates at Piz Lagrev.
