= Piz Albana =

Mountain in Switzerland

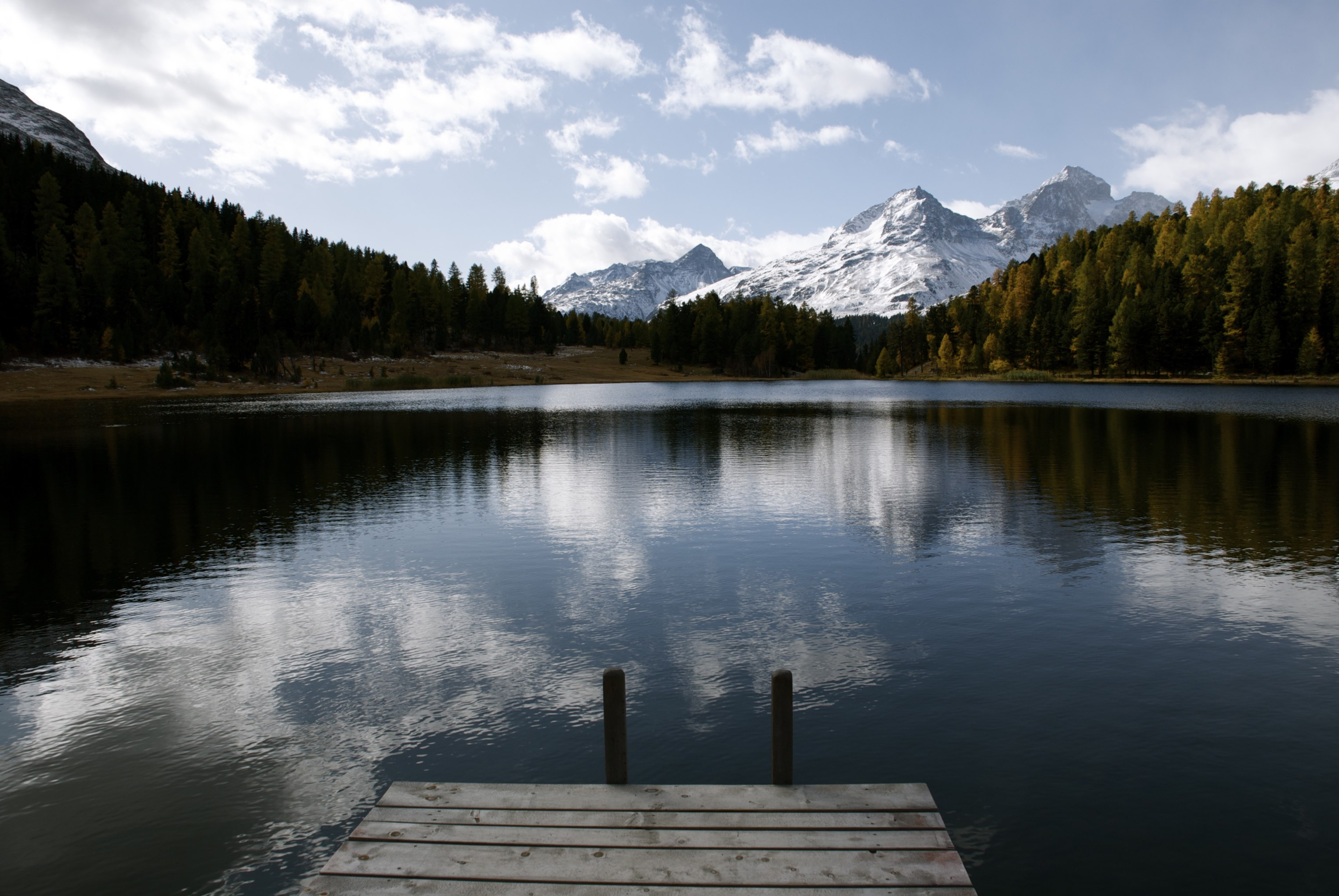
- Piz Albana (centre-right) and Piz Julier (right) from Lej da Staz

Highest point
- Elevation: 3,100 m (10,200 ft)
- Prominence: 230 m (750 ft)
- Parent peak: Piz Calderas
- Coordinates: 46°28′52″N 9°46′25″E

Geography
- Location within Switzerland
- Location: Graubünden, Switzerland
- Parent range: Albula Alps

Piz Albana (3,100 m) is a mountain of the Albula Alps, overlooking Champfèr in the canton of Graubünden. It lies east of Piz Julier, on the range north of the Julier Pass.
