= Florian Stoppany =

Swiss hotelier (1842–1901)

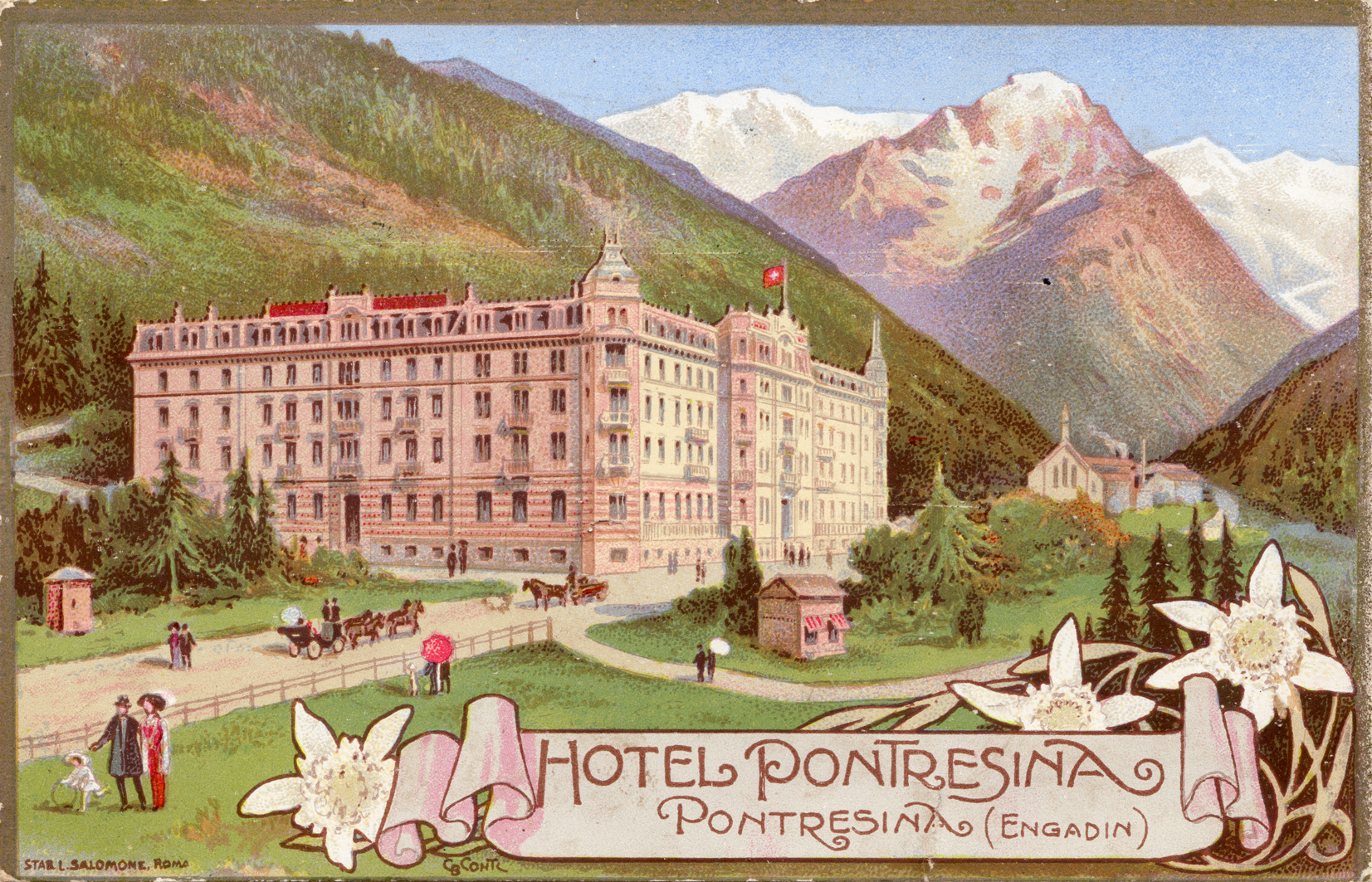
- Hotel Pontresina (ca. 1915)
- Born: Florian Stuppaun; 6 February 1842; Berlin, Prussia
- Died: 26 January 1901 (aged 58); Pontresina, Graubünden, Switzerland
- Occupation: Hotelier
- Known for: Sporthotel Pontresina
- Spouse: Betty Stiffler
- Children: 6 Johann (1872); Lina (1874); Verena (1875); Ursina (1876); Florian (1878); Betty (1882)
- Parent(s): Giachem Bunom Stoppany (1800–1867); Carolina Josty (1805–1876)

Florian Stoppany (6 February 1842 - 26 January 1901) was a Swiss hotelier. His enduring legacy is the Sporthotel Pontresina in Graubünden.

== Life ==
=== Family provenance and early years ===
Florian Stoppany, the third of his parents' recorded children, came from a family of bakers and confectioners that had been present in Pontresina over many generations. In the local Romansh language the family name was Stupan or Stuppaun, which was changed to Stuppano and Stoppany, respectively, in Italian and French. The family's wealth had been sufficient, as far back as 1742, for them to construct the "Chesa Stuppaun" (today the "Chesa Campbell"), a very substantial family house in the mainstreet of Pontresina.

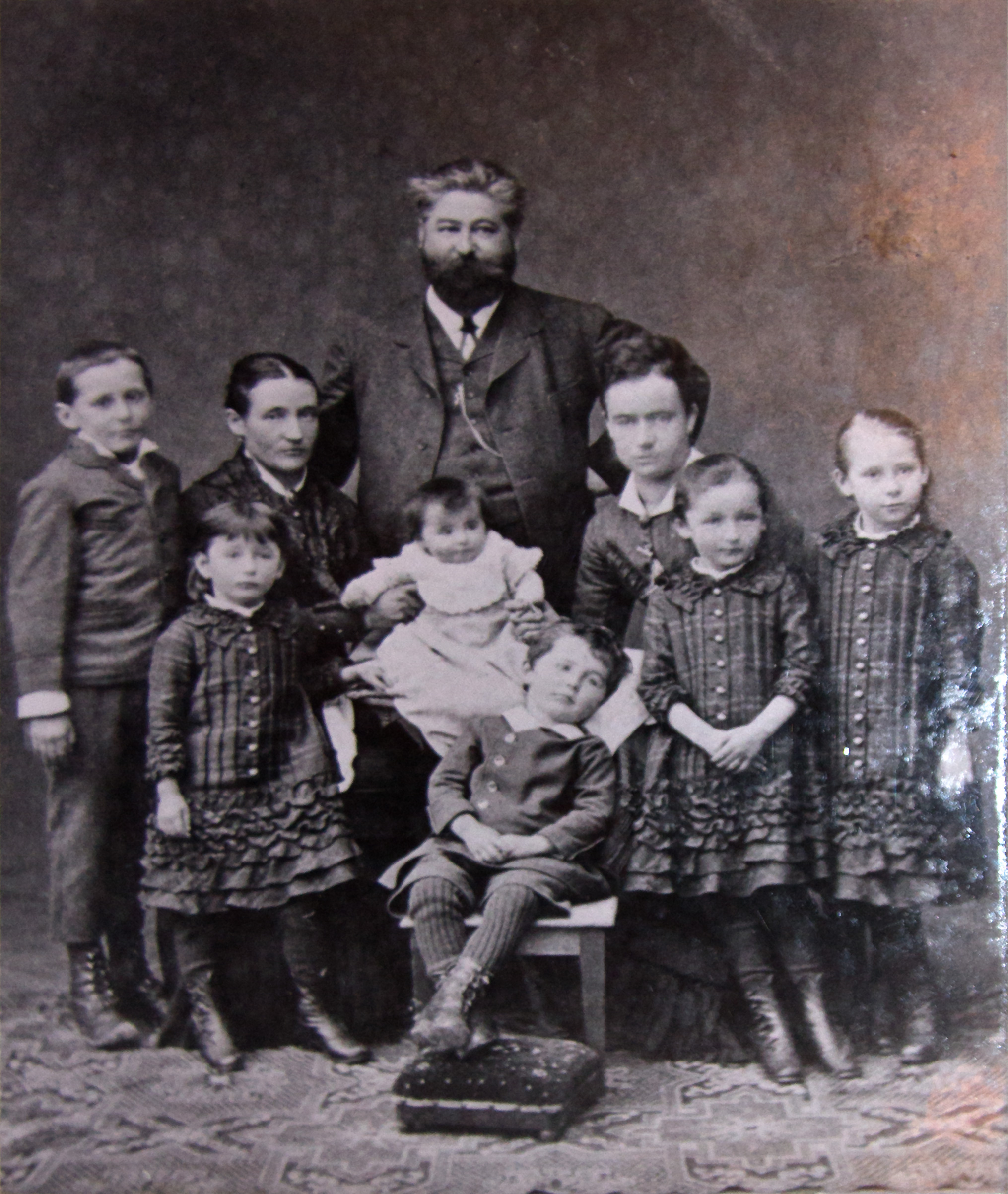
Florian and Betty Stoppany with their six children

His father, Giachem Bunom Stoppany (1800–1867), had relocated to Berlin in Prussia. There, in partnership with another Graubünden expatriate, Johann Stehely from Silvaplana, he ran the Café Stehely near the city's Gendarmenmarkt (square), where it was fashionable for German poets to assemble. In Berlin, Giachem Stoppany linked up with Carolina Josty (1805–1876), whom he married in 1833. She had a part share in the Café Josty, which at that time was located in the street "An der Stechbahn" near the City Palace, and which became another favourite meeting place for Germany's nineteenth century literary elite. Florian's two elder sisters, Ursina Henriette and Carolina, were born respectively in 1835 and 1837.

After he retired, Giachem Bunom Stoppany returned to Pontresina with his wife and elder daughter, Ursina Henriette in 1862/63. The younger daughter, Carolina, married a French language teacher called Adolphe Goulbier with whom she settled in Berlin. Florian, once he had completed his schooling, worked in a succession of Bakery and confectionery businesses run by Graubünden expatriates in various European cities.

In the early 1870s Florian Stoppany returned to Pontresina, hoping to apply the commercial knowledge he had acquired to the tourism business which was by this time expanding rapidly, supported by the railway boom and a surge in middle class incomes, notably in Great Britain and Germany. Florian Stoppany's cousin, Florian Zambail, had opened the Hotel Roseg in Pontresina in 1870. Stoppany became co-owner of this hotel, of which he would remain a director for many years. Their two families were already closely connected: Florian's aunt, Chiatarina Stoppany, had married Barnard Zambail in 1813, as a result of which the two Florians were first cousins. Family connections were reinforced in 1867 when Florian's elder sister, Ursina Henriette Stoppany, married another cousin, Barnard Zambail junior, who was Florian Zambail's brother. It was also in 1867 that the closeness of the two families was confirmed, following the death of Florian Stoppany's father, when their family home, the "Chesa Stuppaun", was sold to the Zambail family.

In 1871 Florian Stoppany married Betty Stiffler whose family ran the Hotel Steinbock and the Maison Stiffler, a restaurant with 25 guest beds. The Stifflers were part of the network of hoteliers exploiting the tourism boom in Pontrsina. The marriage produced six recorded children.

The death of his mother in 1876 freed up his family inheritance and enabled Florian Stoppany to set up in business on his own. An opportunity presented itself with the unexpected death, on 17 December 1878, of his brother-in-law, aged just 35. Caspar Stiffler's sons were too young to take on their father's business, and by March 1879 Florian Stoppany had taken on the "Maison Stiffler" restaurant with its guest rooms. His wife Betty and her sister Christina Nadig-Stiffler had already been running their brother's establishment for some years as the "Stiffler sisters". In 1881 a major rebuild and expansion took place and the Maison Stiffler was integrated into a neighbouring property, the previously separate photographic shop acquired from a photographer, named Alex Flury. The new building, based on a design drawn up by the architect brothers Ragaz, was relaunched as a larger hotel. The 1880s and 1890s were years of rapid expansion for the tourist trade in Pontresina, and a further major rebuild took the "Hotel Pontresina" to its present size in 1895.

His wife, Betty, died on 11 February 1896. Florian Stoppany died on 26 January 1901. Their bodies are buried together, close to other family members, at the graveyard by the Church of St. Maria in Pontresina. Direction of the hotel passed to his eldest son, Johann Stoppany. In the longer term, many of his children and remoter descendants took leading roles in the hospitality business in Pontresina during the ensuing decades.
