= Jakob Ragaz =

Swiss architect (1846–1922)

Jakob Ragaz (29 September 1846 – 27 May 1922) was a Swiss architect. He is best known for his work on a series of "grand hotels" built in connection with the Swiss tourism boom during the second half of the nineteenth century.

== Life ==
Jakob Ragaz was born into a family of craftsmen in Tamins, a village in the canton of Grisons, located a short distance to the west of Chur and close to the point where the "Hinterrhein" and "Vorderrhein" rivers join together and become the River Rhine. He attended the cantonal secondary school ("Scola chantunala grischuna") in Chur and then moved on to study at polytechnical academies in Stuttgart and Munich. As a newly trained architect he received his first commission in the Engadin valley, where his father, Linhard Ragaz, had been employed as a carpenter in the 1840s. He took on project management for construction of the "Hotel Bernina" in Samedan, which the architect Johann Jakob Breitinger had abandoned in order to focus on a city planning scheme in his home city of Zürich.

The Engadin valley was the focus of a construction surge. The growth in tourism reflected the rapid development of a newly prosperous middle class produced by dynamic industrial expansion in Germany and Britain. The resulting surge in building contracts led Ragaz to settle in Samedan where, together with his younger brother Georg Ragaz (1857–1909), he founded a building firm. Georg, as a master carpenter, took charge of the practical construction work while Jakob, trained as an architect, focused on design.

Jakob Ragaz had a major influence on the rapid evolution of Pontresina from a farming village to a spa and tourism resort, with a succession of hotels and villas constructed between 1870 and 1890. Major commissions included the Hotel Saratz (today part of the Sporthotel Pontresina complex), Languard and Enderlin along with the Villas Ludwig and Gredig. During the 1890s most of the Pontresina hotels were expanded in response to competition from neighbouring resorts – notably St. Moritz – and rising customer demand. The styles adopted were increasingly flamboyant manifestations of Neo-Baroque and Neo-Renaissance. Of particular note is the expansion of the Hotel Kronenhof between 1896 and 1898 to its present "horseshoe-shaped three-winged" configuration.

His brother Georg died in 1909 after which the building business was taken over by the Samedan firm, "Koch, Vonesch & Co". Jakob Ragaz went back to Tamins where he died in 1922.

His papers are held by the Cantonal Archive in Chur.
