= Graubündner Kantonalbank =

Cantonal bank based in Chur, Switzerland

Coordinates: 46.8505°N 9.5319°E

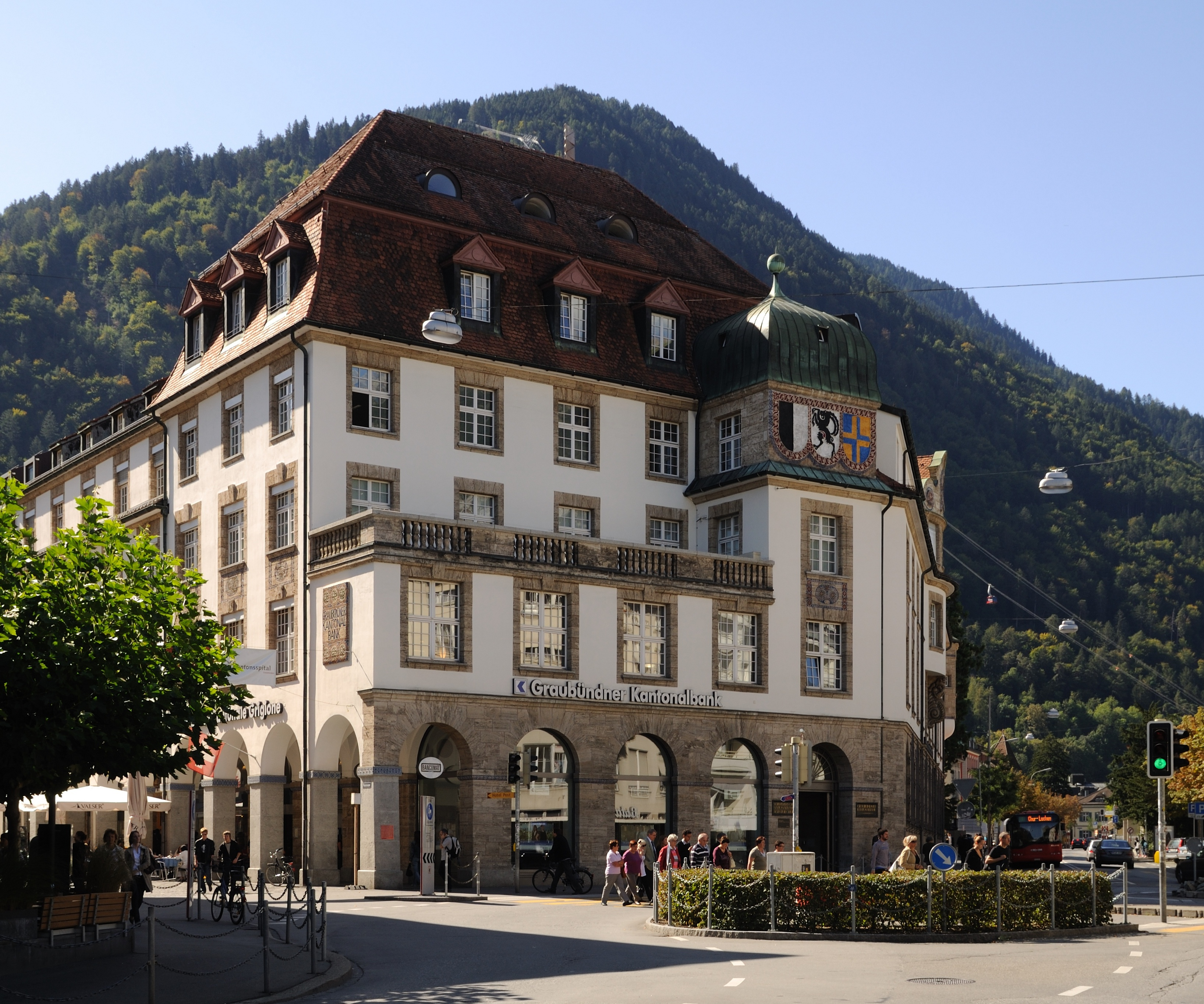
- Type: Public-law institution
- Traded as: SIX: GRKP
- ISIN: CH0001340204
- Industry: financial service activities, except insurance and pension funding
- Founded: 1870; 156 years ago
- Headquarters: Chur, Grisons, Switzerland
- Number of locations: 42 (2025)
- Area served: Graubünden
- Key people: Daniel Fust (CEO), Heinz Huber (Chairman)
- Products: Banking
- Operating income: 513.2 mln CHF (2025)
- Total assets: 36'307'387 mln CHF (2025)
- Number of employees: 999 (2025)
- Website: www.gkb.ch

The Graubündner Kantonalbank (known as Banca Chantunala Grischuna in Romansh or Banca Cantonale Grigione in Italian) is a Swiss cantonal bank which is part of the 24 cantonal banks serving Switzerland's 26 cantons. The headquarters are located in Chur, and there are 45 branches around Graubünden.

== History ==
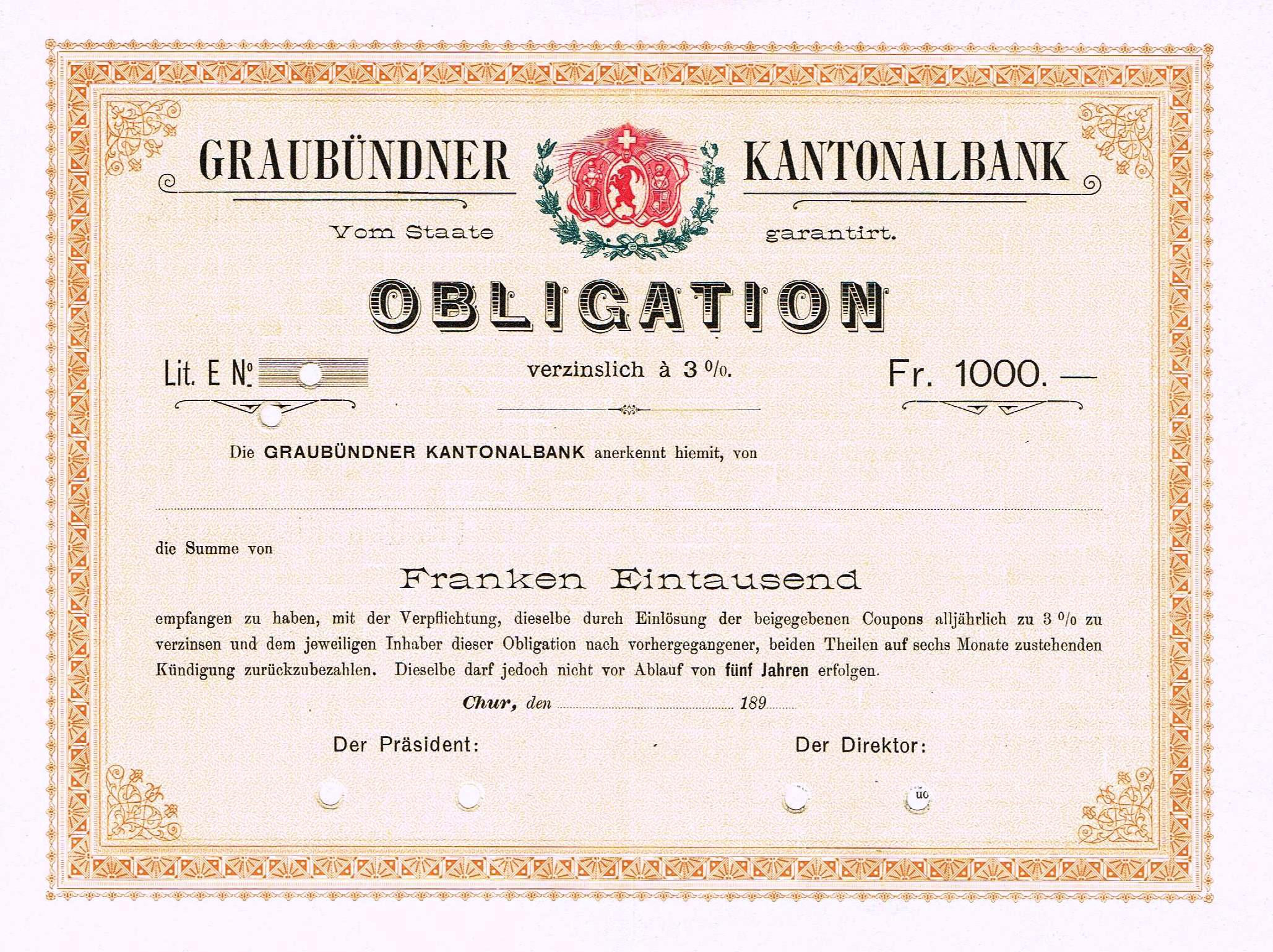
Blank bond of the Graubündner Kantonalbank

Graubündner Kantonalbank (GKB) was founded in 1870. Just seven years later in 1877, it helped fund an Alpine Road to bring more tourism to its homeland area. In the great depression around 1919, the bank financially helped and supported the Swiss population, and when the post-wars boom came in 1945, it poured money into providing better public services.

After a successful computerisation in the 1970s, the bank introduced its first automated teller machines in 1983. On 10 September 1985 GKB was listed on the Swiss Stock Exchange. In 1998 it received in writing a guarantee from the Swiss government of 100% back-up for its savers' money. In the same year GKB purchased the private Zurich bank Bellerive. In more recent times, the company has begun working with the Private Client Bank in Zurich.

== Products ==
The Graubündner Kantonalbank offers a range of products based at different parts of the market. It offers an account for young people, one for private banking for normal Swiss citizens and outside. They also offer a business banking scheme.
