= Piz Lagrev =

Mountain in Switzerland

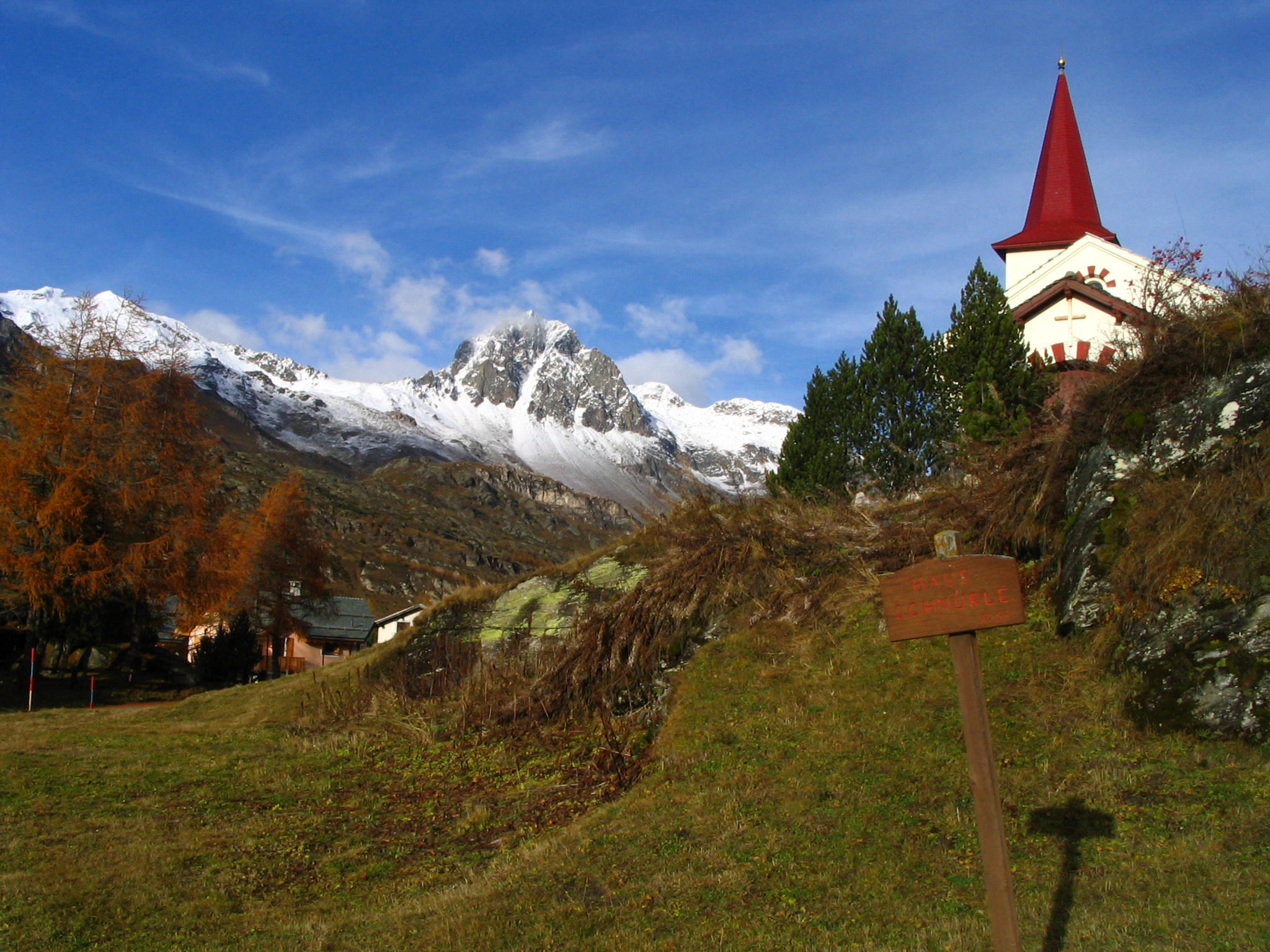
- View from the Maloja Pass

Highest point
- Elevation: 3,165 m (10,384 ft)
- Prominence: 855 m (2,805 ft)
- Parent peak: Piz Platta
- Listing: Alpine mountains above 3000 m
- Coordinates: 46°26′45.6″N 9°43′25.2″E

Geography
- Location within Switzerland
- Location: Graubünden, Switzerland
- Parent range: Albula Alps

Climbing
- First ascent: 9 October 1875 by L. Held and Moritz Arpagaus

Piz Lagrev is a mountain of the Albula Alps, overlooking Lake Sils in the Swiss canton of Graubünden. On its northern side lies the Julier Pass. Reaching a height of 3,165 metres (10,384 feet) above sea level, Piz Lagrev is the culminating point of the range lying between the Septimer Pass and the Julier Pass.

Northeast of Piz Lagrev is a small glacier named Vadret Lagrev and an unnamed lake at its bottom.
