= Piz Julier =

Mountain in the Albula Alps

- Piz Güglia
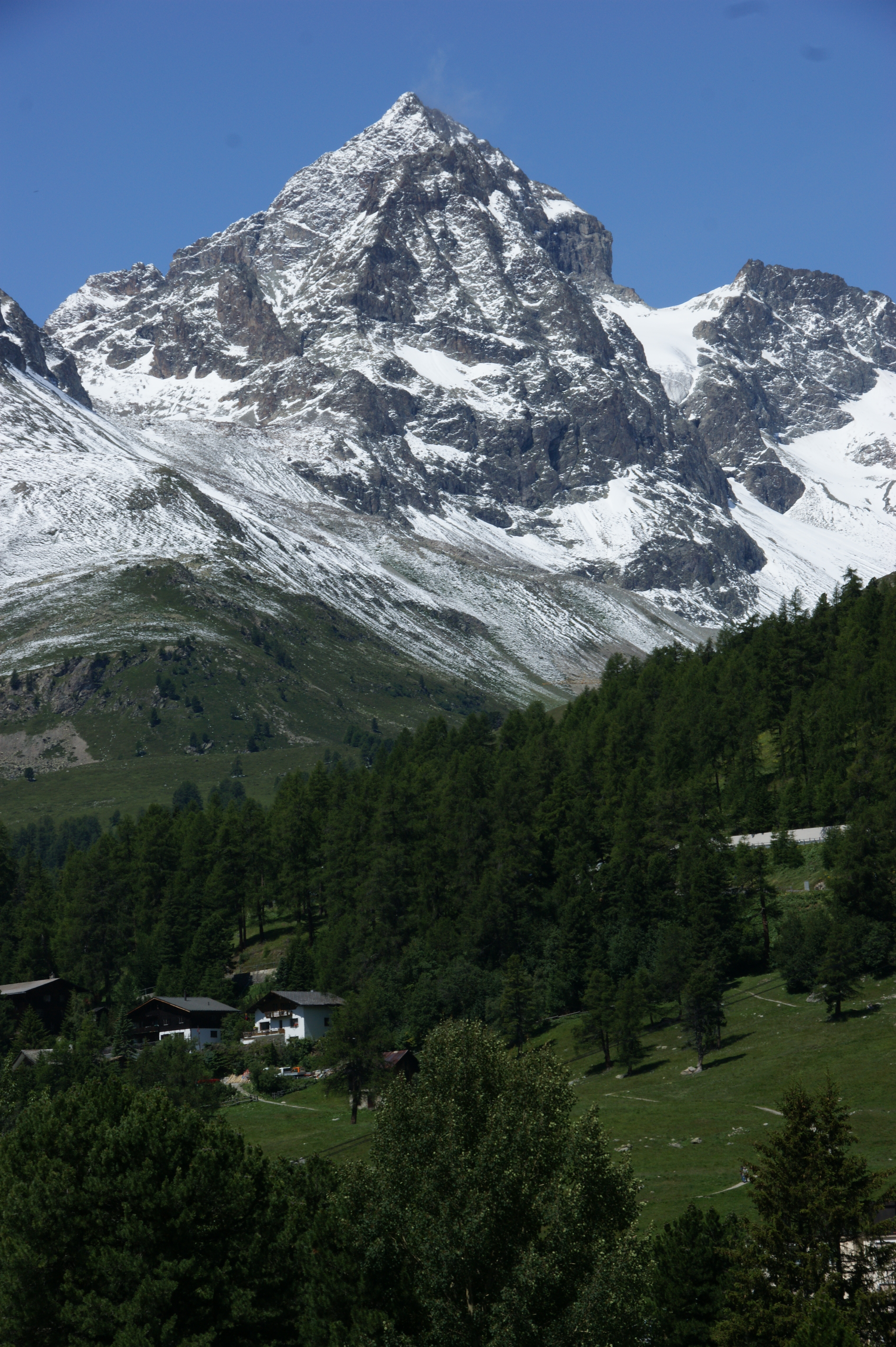
- View from St. Moritz (east side)

Highest point
- Elevation: 3,380 m (11,090 ft)
- Prominence: 489 m (1,604 ft)
- Parent peak: Piz Calderas
- Isolation: 7.0 km (4.3 mi)
- Listing: Alpine mountains above 3000 m
- Coordinates: 46°29′27.3″N 9°45′35.8″E

Geography
- Location within Switzerland
- Location: Graubünden, Switzerland
- Parent range: Albula Alps

Piz Julier (German, Romansh: Piz Güglia) is a mountain of the Albula Alps, overlooking the Julier Pass, in the Swiss canton of Graubünden. With a height of 3,380 metres above sea level, Piz Julier is the second highest peak (after Piz Calderas) of the group between the Julier Pass and the Albula Pass.

Piz Julier can be summited by experienced hikers. From the heights of St. Moritz, a trail leads to Fuorcla Albana (2,870 metres), the pass between Piz Julier and Piz Albana. From there a via ferrata, named Senda Enferrada leads to the summit.

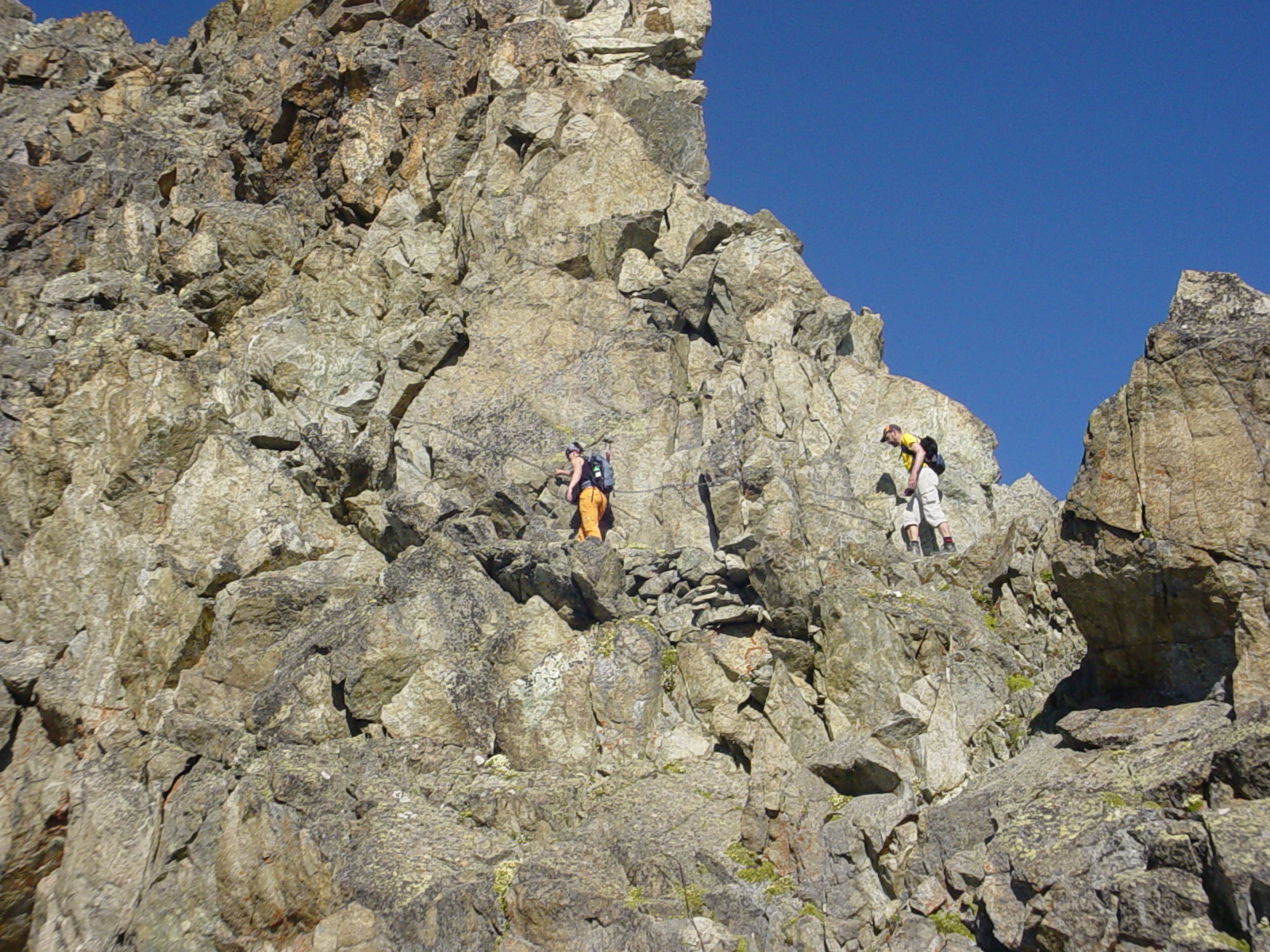
Climbers on the normal route
