= Julier Pass =

Mountain pass in Switzerland

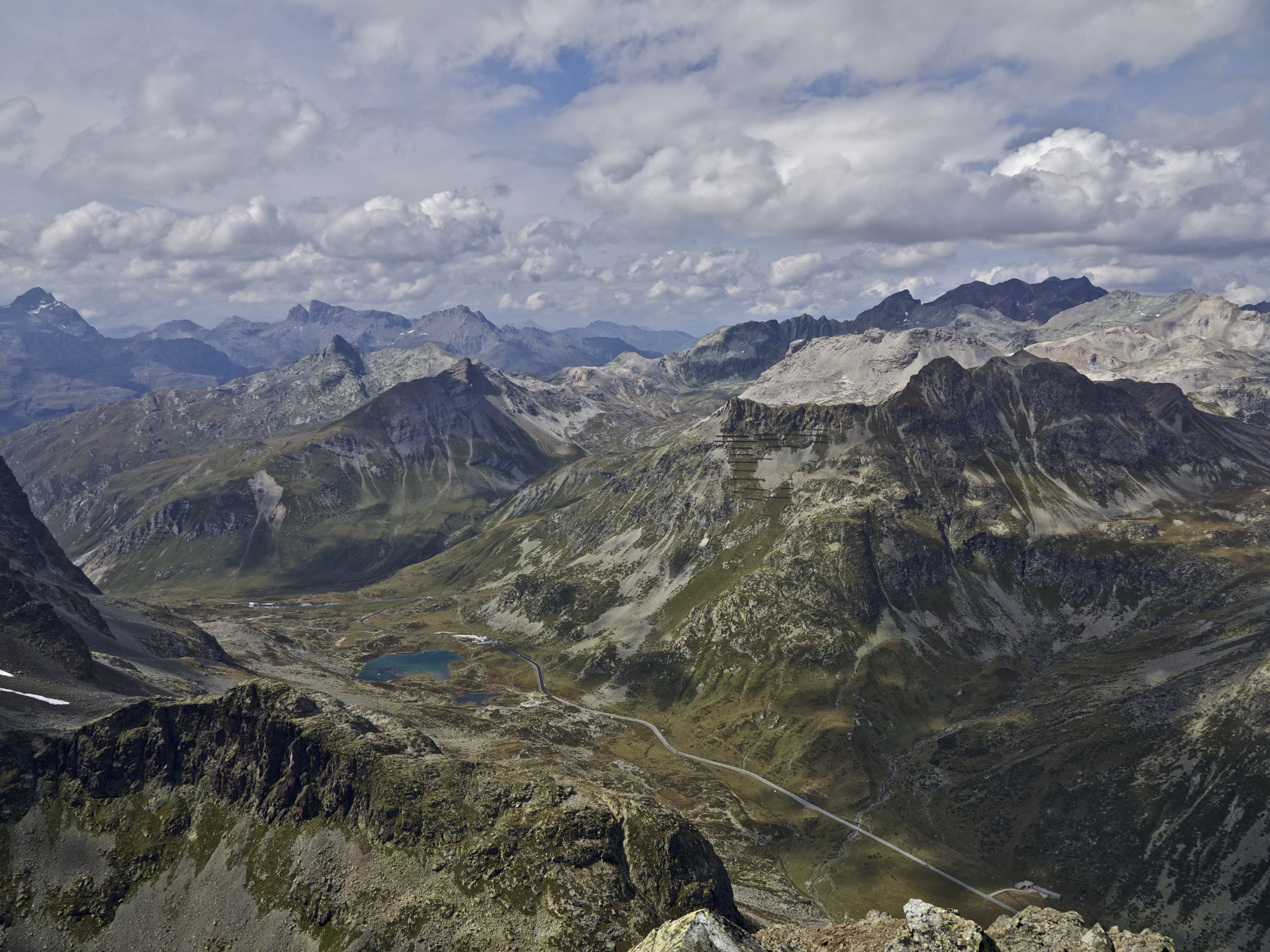
- View of the Julier Pass from Piz Polaschin

- Location within Switzerland
- Elevation: 2,284 metres (7,493 ft)
- Traversed by: Paved road

Third Approach
- Location: Graubünden, Switzerland
- Range: Albula Alps
- Coordinates: 46°28′20″N 9°43′40″E

The Julier Pass (Romansh: Pass dal Güglia, German: Julierpass, Italian Passo del Giulia) (elev. 2284 m) is a mountain pass in the Albula Alps of Switzerland. It connects the Engadin valley with central Graubünden. At its summit, the pass crosses the drainage divide between the basins of the rivers Rhine and Danube.

The Julier Pass lies between the towns of Bivio to the west and Silvaplana to the east. It is part of the Swiss N29 national road, but does not require a vignette (road tax sticker). The pass was heavily used in the Roman era and contains the most artifacts of Roman roads of any location in Graubünden. The modern road was built between 1820 and 1828. Between 1935 and 1940, the Julier Pass became the first Swiss alpine road paved with asphalt.

The Julier Pass is the most important northern entrance to the Engadin valley and one of three such paved road passes, the others being the Albula Pass and the Flüela Pass.

== Geography and conditions ==
The highest point of the Julier Pass is 2284 meters above sea level. The Julier Pass lies south of Piz Bardella, Piz Lagrev, and Piz Julier, and north of Piz da las Coluonnas and Piz Polaschin. A few metres south of the summit is a small lake, Lej da las Culuonnas.

The two-lane road over the Julier Pass is generally open to trucks with four-wheel drive even when covered with snow. Cars are required to have snow tires in the winter, and snow chains may be required, depending on the conditions.

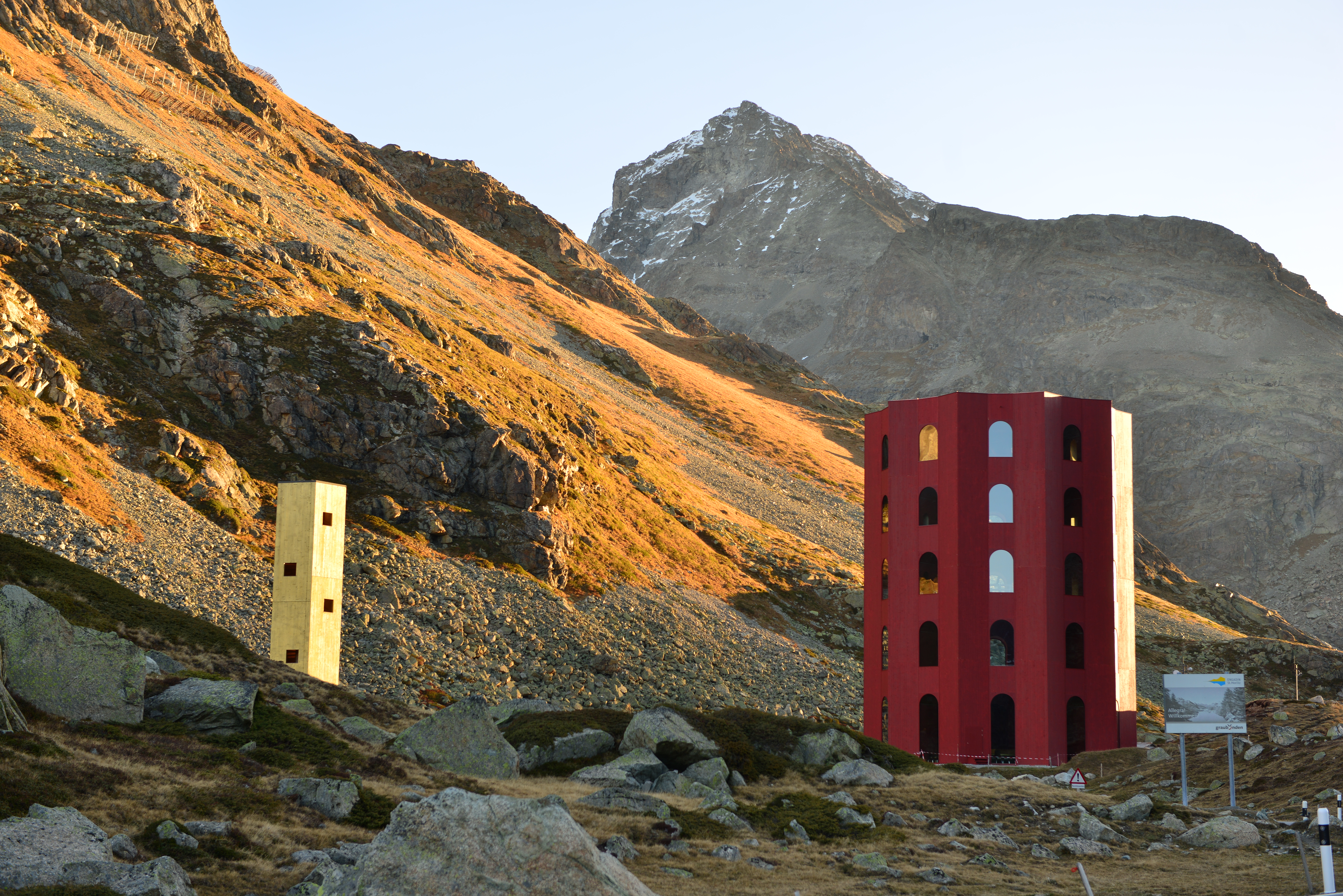
The Julier theater tower in 2017

Originally a cantonal road, the Julier Pass was adopted into the Swiss federal highway system on 1 January 2020 as part of the new N29 from Thusis via Tiefencastel to Silvaplana. The N29 highway is 56.25 km (34.95 mi) long and connects to the N13 highway at Thusis-Süd. Previously, the stretch from Thusis to Tiefencastle was designated as the H417 main road and the stretch from Tiefencastel to Silvaplana was the H3a main road. Since the N29 is a 3rd class national road, vehicles using it are not required to display a vignette.

The Julier Pass was home to a temporary theater tower from 31 July 2017 to 31 August 2023. The 30-meter-high wooden tower was built by Nova Fundaziun Origen, a cultural foundation started in 2005. The theater tower cost 2.5 million Swiss francs and was ceremonially opened by Federal Councillor Alain Berset. As of 2023, Origen is planning a permanent replacement costing CHF 25 million.

== History ==
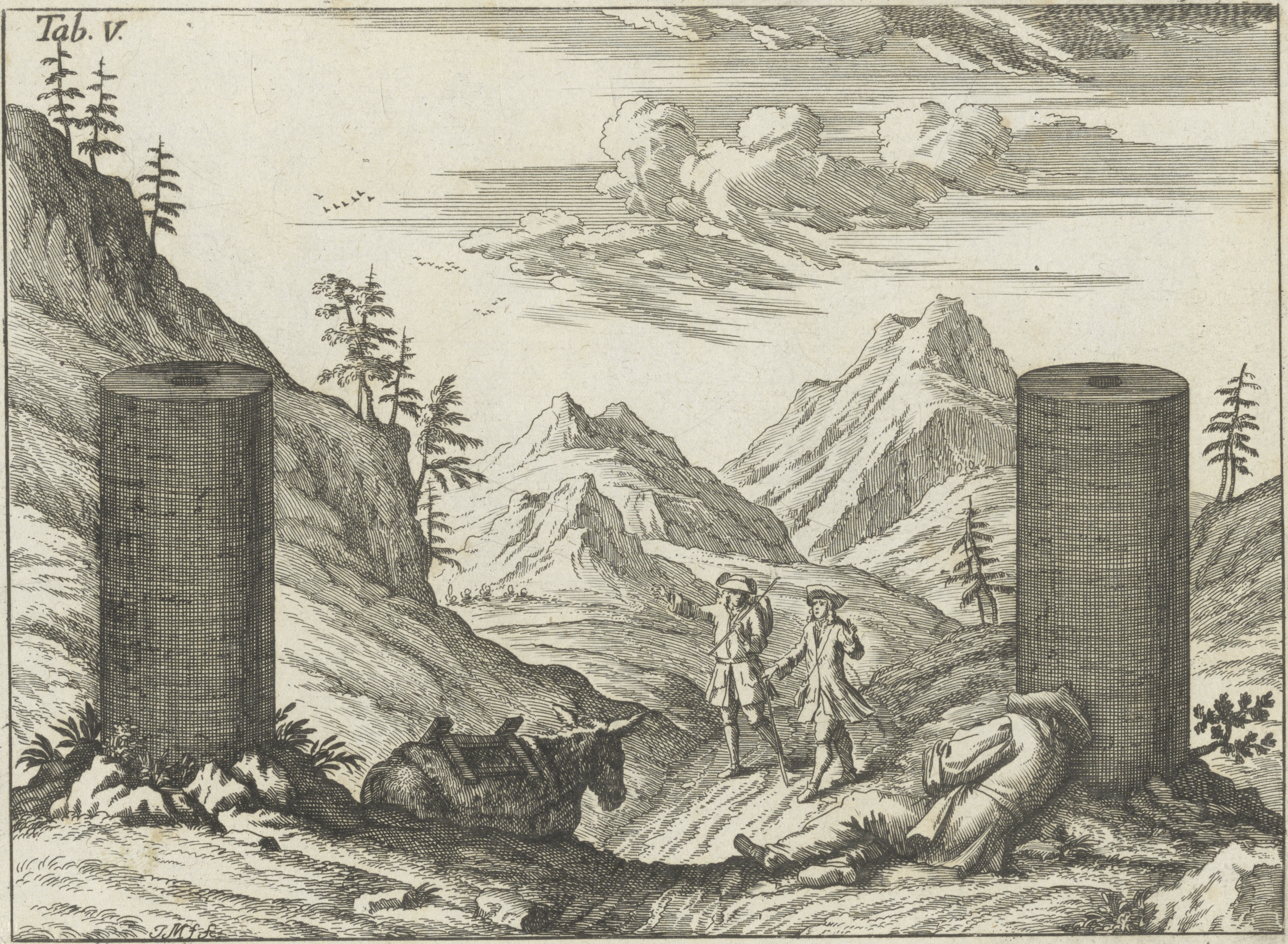
An engraving by Johann Melchior Füssli of the Roman columns atop the Julier Pass

The Julier Pass was in regular use during the Bronze and Iron Ages. It saw heavy traffic in the Roman era, evidenced by the countless coins and remains of Roman roads discovered in the region; it has the most artifacts of the Roman roads of any location in the canton. Two monumental soapstone columns flank the modern pass road at its summit; excavations in the 1930s revealed that the columns were part of a Roman sanctuary.

Historically, the Julier Pass competed with the shorter but steeper Septimer Pass. Together, the two passes made up the Obere Strasse (lit. 'upper road'), which continued northwards via Lenzerheide to Chur, and southwards via the Maloja Pass. During the Roman era, the Julier and Septimer Passes were roads suitable for two-wheeled carts, the largest vehicles able to negotiate the steep slopes, and it is theorized that carts were sent over the Julier Pass when loaded and over the Septimer Pass when empty. At the time, the less-developed Splügen Pass was only suitable for pack animals.

The Julier Pass lost importance in 1387, when a small road over the Septimer Pass was built. In 1473, the path through the Viamala was expanded, and the Obere Strasse was no longer preferred for transalpine travel. The Viamala was part of the Untere Strasse (lit. 'lower road'), which ran via the Splügen Pass and San Bernardino Pass. Thus, in the High and Late Middle Ages, the Julier Pass was mainly used to provide access to the upper Engadin, Bernina Pass, and Fuorn Pass. This shift led the Bishop of Chur, who controlled the Obere Strasse, to acquire Thusis and Heinzenberg from the Counts of Werdenberg, giving him control of the Untere Strasse and a monopoly over the passes of the Three Leagues.

In the first millennium, the passes of Graubünden were controlled by a patchwork of feudal lords. By the second millennium, transport over the passes was operated by six cooperatives called Porten or Rodgenossenschaften. The Porten were commercial enterprises which transported goods for a fee. They were also responsible for maintaining the passes and roads and would work with local towns and governments to improve road infrastructure. The Porten, as associations of teamsters (Fuhrleute), also functioned similarly to guilds, with 3500 members by the late 18th century. Goods had to be offloaded and re-loaded onto new carts or pack animals for each Port that transported them, with the result that goods moving from Chur to Chiavenna or Bellinzona had to be off- and re-loaded no less than six times. Despite this inefficiency, the Porten of the Untere Strasse were the preferred transalpine route, ahead of the Gotthard and Brenner, except in times of war, until they were overtaken by the Brenner Pass in the early 19th century. By that point, large, efficient horse-drawn vehicles could cross the Brenner, allowing a single teamster to transport 30 Zentner (3000 pounds) of goods. In Graubünden, road conditions were still so poor that only pack animals or two-wheeled carts could cross the passes.

=== Roadbuilding ===
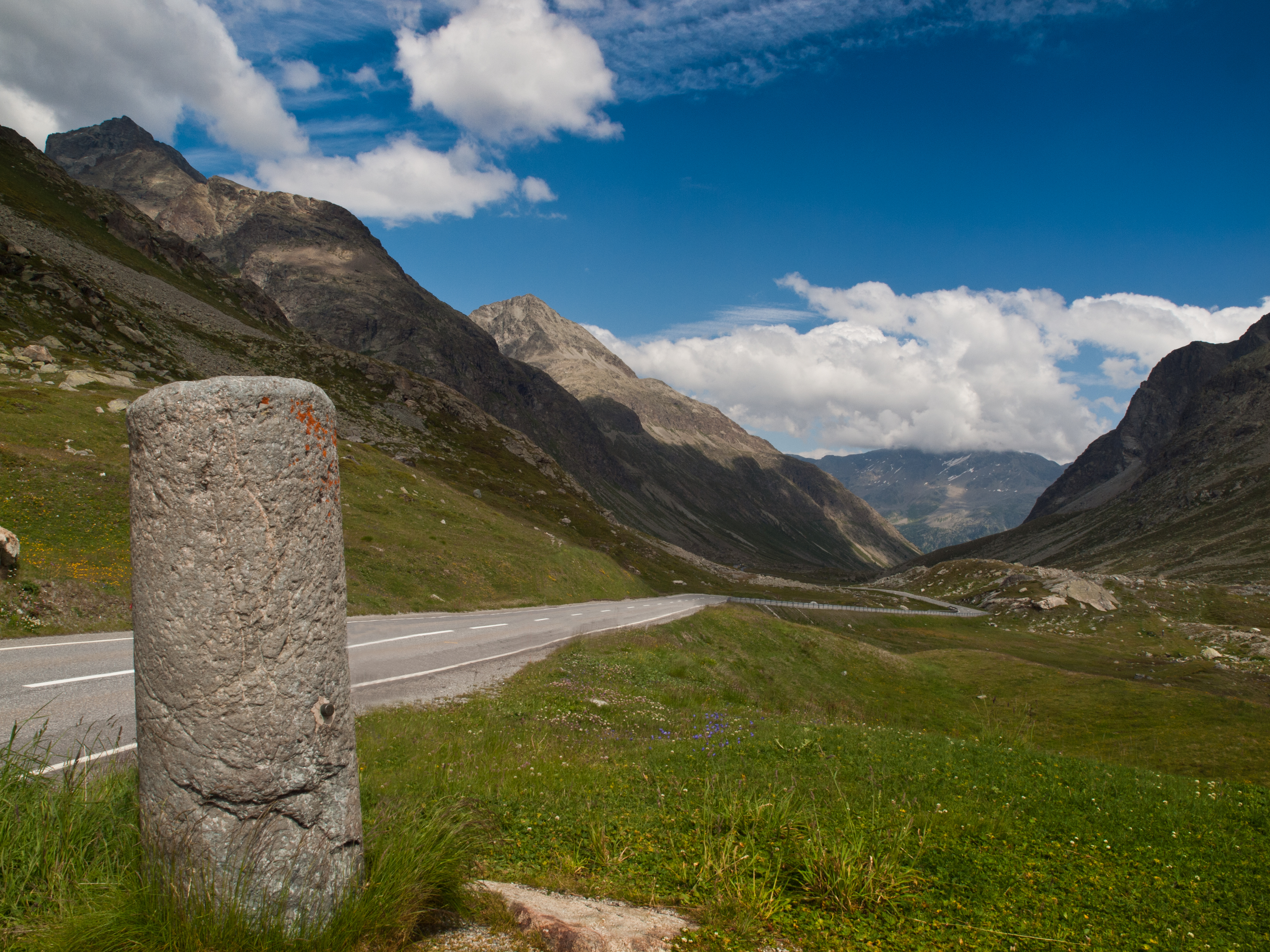
One of the Roman columns beside the modern pass road

The 1803 Act of Mediation turned the Three Leagues into the Swiss canton of Graubünden, which returned economic stability to the region after the chaos of the Italian and Swiss expedition. By this point, the Brenner Pass had overtaken Graubünden as the most efficient transalpine route, largely due to better road infrastructure. The poor roads in Graubünden were especially troublesome when they prevented the northward transport of large amounts of grain during the Year Without a Summer (1816) and subsequent years of famine; most of the grain purchased abroad spoiled in Italian harbors or at the foot of the Alps. This resulted in strong support in Graubünden for building roads across the Alpine passes.

The first two paved roads (Kunststrassen) over the alpine passes built in Graubünden were along the San Bernardino and Splügen Passes of the Untere Strasse. In 1816, a six-meter-wide road along the 100-kilometer-long San Bernardino route was plotted by Ticino State Councillor Giulio Pocobelli within a few days. Although supported by Ticino and the Kingdom of Sardinia, the project was difficult to finance and was opposed by cantons along the Gotthard route and Austria, which controlled Lombardy. Eventually, with funding from the merchants of Chur, the Porten, and the municipalities along the route, construction of the San Bernardino commercial road began on 14 September 1818 and was completed by the summer of 1823. In the meantime, Lombardy constructed a four-meter-wide road over the Splügen Pass, which was completed by the summer of 1822.

Between 1820 and 1828, the canton of Graubünden expanded the road from Chur to Castasegna via the Julier and Maloja Passes into a five-meter-wide commercial road, at a cost of 1.24 million Francs. The Julier Pass was chosen over the Septimer for its gentler slope, lower avalanche risk, and access to the Engadin valley. The construction of this new road proved prescient when massive flooding of the Hinterrhein in 1834 obstructed the Untere Strasse to San Bernardino at 72 locations and destroyed 24 bridges. The new road allowed the displaced transalpine traffic to be rerouted over the unaffected Julier Pass without issue. From 1835 onward, the chief engineer of the canton of Graubünden, Richard La Nicca, worked to improve the Obere Strasse, including the Julier Pass. La Nicca was self-taught and mentored by Pocobelli, who together came to define this period of Kunststrasse construction. The many bridges La Nicca designed have been praised for their unique and aesthetic design; many have lasted to the present day.

In the second half of the 19th century, the Julier Pass was most notable for providing access to the spa towns of the upper Engadin, while transalpine traffic preferred the Splügen route or new alpine railways. Proposed plans for a Julier railway were never realized and the 1903 opening of the Albula railway line through the Albula Tunnel all but ended road traffic over the Julier Pass.

In 1923, the Swiss federal government forced Graubünden to open a through road for automobiles, and the canton chose the Julier route for this role. The Julier route was again expanded and upgraded between 1935 and 1940, becoming the first Swiss alpine road with an asphalt surface. Today, the Julier Pass is the most important northern entrance to the Engadin valley. Around 3,000 vehicles cross the Julier Pass every day.

== See also ==
- List of highest paved roads in Switzerland
- List of highest road passes in Switzerland
