= Crasta Mora =

Mountain in Switzerland

Highest point
- Elevation: 2,952 m (9,685 ft)
- Prominence: 486 m (1,594 ft)
- Parent peak: Piz Calderas
- Coordinates: 46°34′17″N 9°52′4″E

Geography
- Location within Switzerland
- Location: Graubünden, Switzerland
- Parent range: Albula Alps

The Crasta Mora is a mountain of the Albula Alps, overlooking Bever in the canton of Graubünden. It lies at the eastern end of the range between the Albula Pass and the Val Bever.
