= Wuosthorn =

Mountain in Switzerland

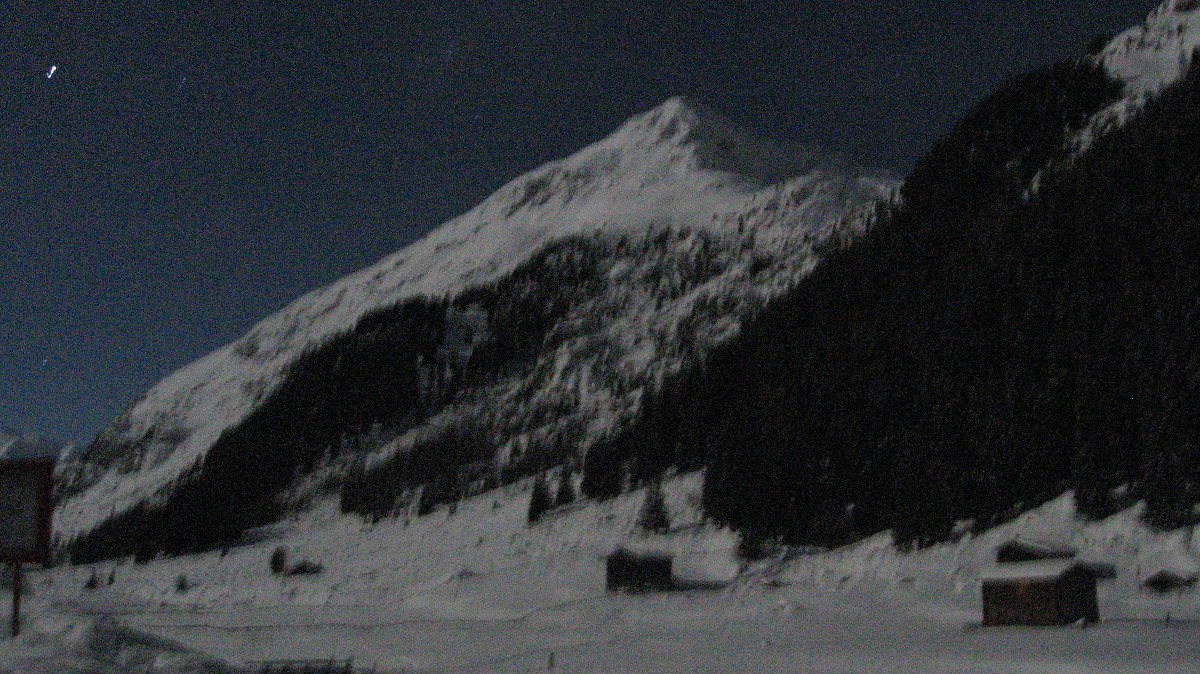
- Börerhorn, night shot from Gulerigen Hus under a full moon

Highest point
- Elevation: 2,815 m (9,236 ft)
- Prominence: 197 m (646 ft)
- Parent peak: Chüealphorn
- Coordinates: 46°44′3.6″N 9°52′39″E

Geography
- Location within Switzerland
- Location: Graubünden, Switzerland
- Parent range: Albula Alps

The Wuosthorn (2,815 m) is a mountain of the Albula Alps, located south of Davos in the canton of Graubünden. It lies north of the Bocktenhorn, on the range between the valleys of Sertig and Dischma.
