= Piz Griatschouls =

Mountain in Switzerland

- Location within Switzerland

Highest point
- Elevation: 2,972 m (9,751 ft)
- Prominence: 173 m (568 ft)
- Parent peak: Piz Kesch
- Coordinates: 46°37′41″N 9°56′37″E

Geography
- Location: Graubünden, Switzerland
- Parent range: Albula Alps

Piz Griatschouls is a mountain of the Albula Alps, located north of Zuoz in the canton of Graubünden. It lies east of Piz Val Müra, on the range between the Val Viluoch and the main Inn valley.
