= Piz Porchabella =

Mountain in Switzerland

- Location within Switzerland

Highest point
- Elevation: 3,079 m (10,102 ft)
- Prominence: 146 m (479 ft)
- Parent peak: Piz Kesch
- Coordinates: 46°38′09″N 9°53′46″E

Geography
- Location: Graubünden, Switzerland
- Parent range: Albula Alps

Piz Porchabella is a mountain of the Albula Alps, overlooking the Porchabella Glacier, north-east of Piz Kesch in the canton of Graubünden.
