= Gletscher Ducan =

Mountain in Switzerland

- Ducan Dador
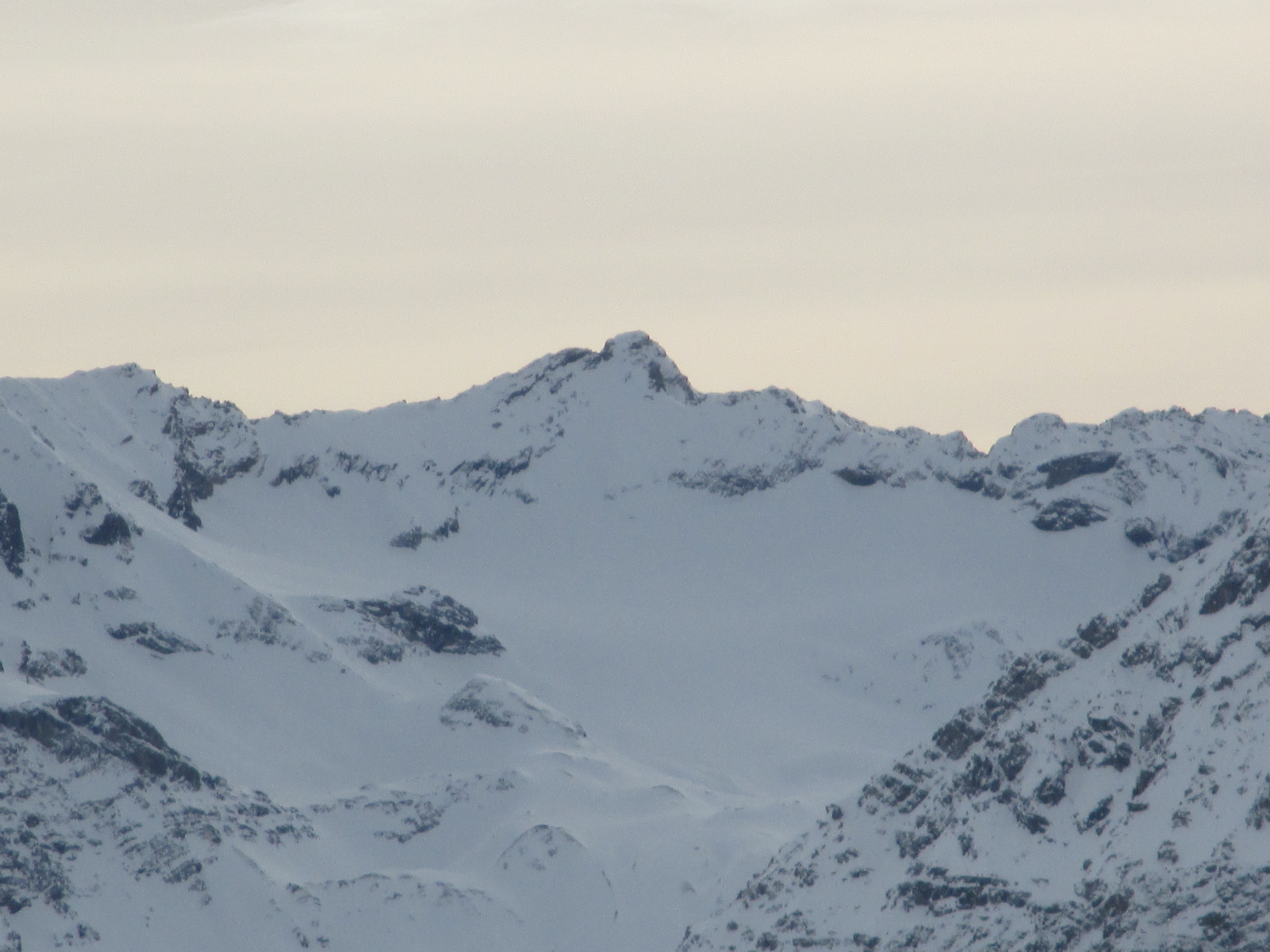
- Gletscher Ducan See from Jakobshorn

Highest point
- Elevation: 3,020 m (9,910 ft)
- Coordinates: 46°40′29.5″N 9°49′48.9″E

Geography
- Location within Switzerland
- Location: Graubünden, Switzerland
- Parent range: Albula Alps

The Gletscher Ducan (also known as Ducan Dador) is a mountain of the Albula Alps, located in Graubünden, Switzerland. On its northern side lies a glacier named Ducangletscher. It lies south-west of the Hoch Ducan.
