= Piz d'Urezza =

Mountain in Switzerland

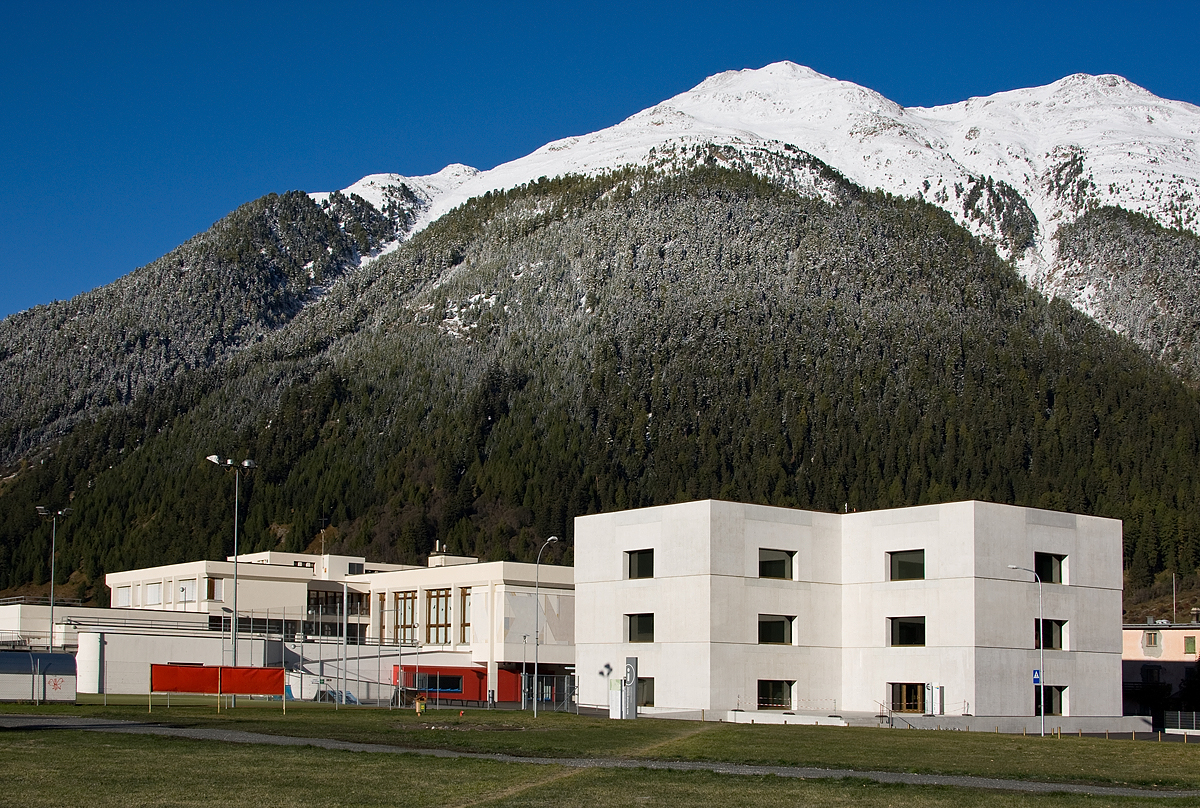
- View from Zernez (east side)

Highest point
- Elevation: 2,906 m (9,534 ft)
- Prominence: 279 m (915 ft)
- Parent peak: Piz Vadret
- Coordinates: 46°41′48″N 10°02′50″E

Geography
- Location within Switzerland
- Location: Graubünden, Switzerland
- Parent range: Albula Alps

Piz d'Urezza (2,906 m) is a mountain of the Albula Alps, located west of Zernez in the canton of Graubünden. It lies east of Piz Sarsura, on the range between the Val Sarsura and the Val Pülschezza.
