= Piz Jenatsch =

Mountain in Switzerland

- Location within Switzerland

Highest point
- Elevation: 3,251 m (10,666 ft)
- Prominence: 131 m (430 ft)
- Parent peak: Piz Calderas
- Coordinates: 46°32′32.9″N 9°42′59.8″E

Geography
- Location: Graubünden, Switzerland
- Parent range: Albula Alps

Piz Jenatsch is a mountain of the Albula Alps, located in the canton of Graubünden. It has an elevation of 3,251 metres above sea level and it is located east of Piz d'Err and Piz Calderas, between the valleys of Val d'Err and Val Bever.

The closest locality is Tinizong on the west side.
