= Chrachenhorn =

Mountain in Switzerland

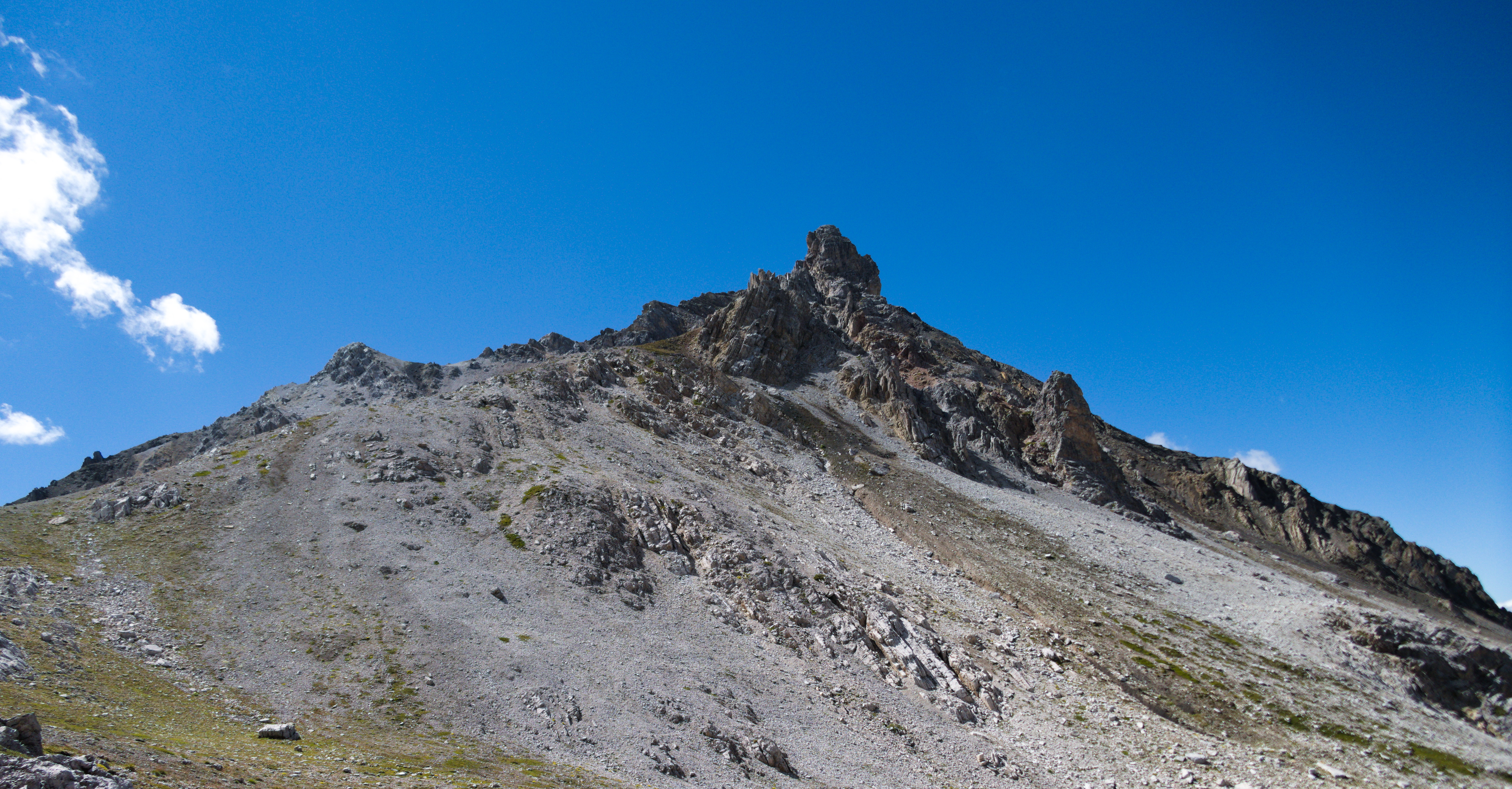

Highest point
- Elevation: 2,891 m (9,485 ft)
- Prominence: 224 m (735 ft)
- Parent peak: Chüealphorn
- Coordinates: 46°41′18″N 9°48′52″E

Geography
- Location within Switzerland
- Location: Graubünden, Switzerland
- Parent range: Albula Alps

The Chrachenhorn (2,891 metres (9,485 ft)) is a mountain of the Albula Alps, overlooking Monstein in the Swiss canton of Graubünden. It lies on the range between the Landwasser and the Ducanfurgga.
