= Piz dal Ras =

Mountain in Switzerland

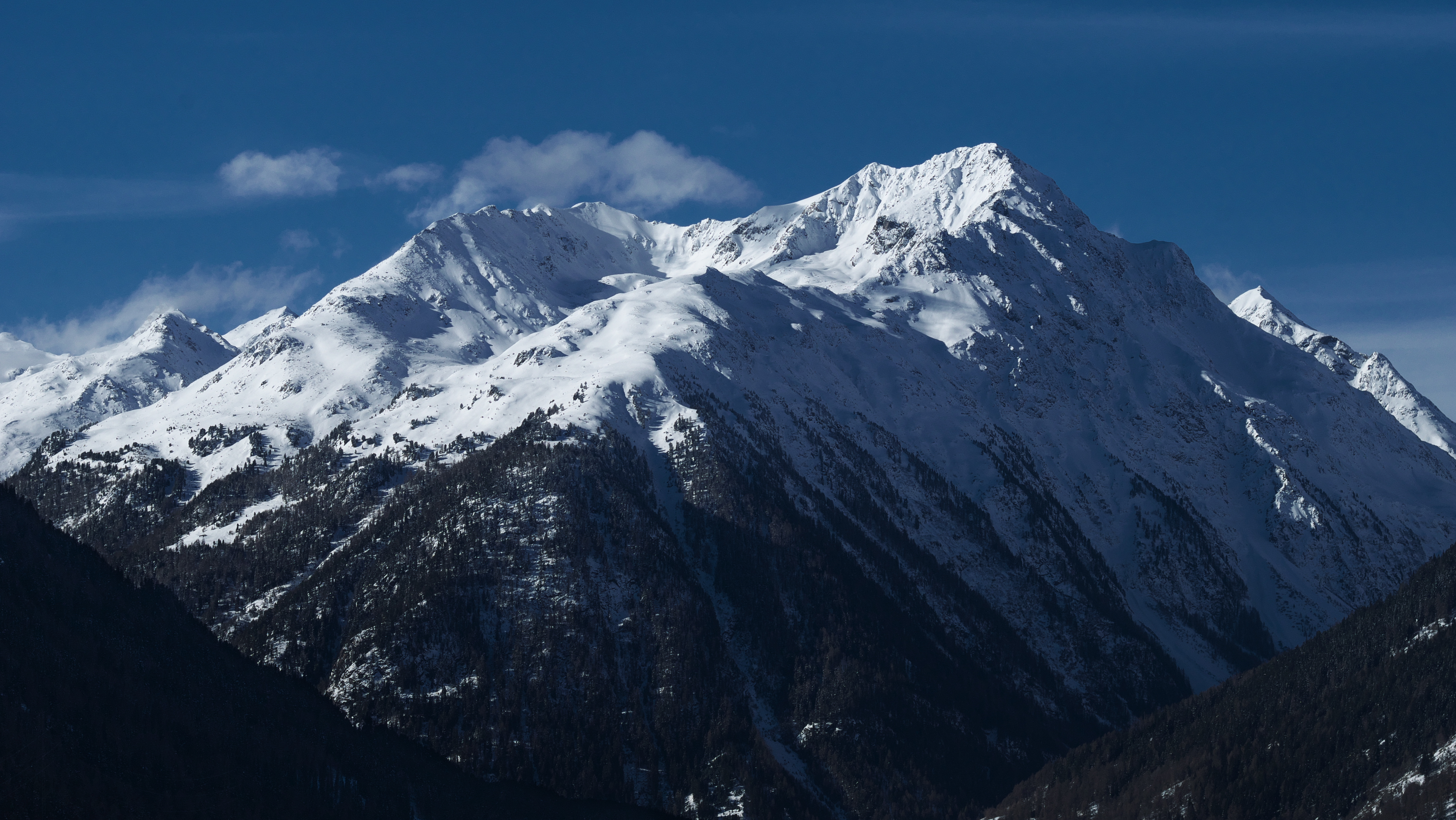
- East view of Piz dal Ras

Highest point
- Elevation: 3,028 m (9,934 ft)
- Prominence: 255 m (837 ft)
- Parent peak: Piz Vadret
- Coordinates: 46°44′18.4″N 10°2′0″E

Geography
- Location within Switzerland
- Location: Graubünden, Switzerland
- Parent range: Albula Alps

Piz dal Ras (3,028 m) is a mountain of the Albula Alps, located in west of Susch in the canton of Graubünden.
