= Piz Neir =

Mountain in Switzerland

- Aerial recording of mountain Piz Neir

Highest point
- Elevation: 2,906 m (9,534 ft)
- Prominence: 191 m (627 ft)
- Parent peak: Piz Calderas
- Coordinates: 46°29′04″N 9°40′49″E

Geography
- Location within Switzerland
- Location: Graubünden, Switzerland
- Parent range: Albula Alps

Piz Neir is a mountain of the Albula Alps, overlooking Bivio in the canton of Graubünden. It lies on the group south of Piz d'Agnel.
