= Piz Ot =

Mountain in Graubünden, Switzerland

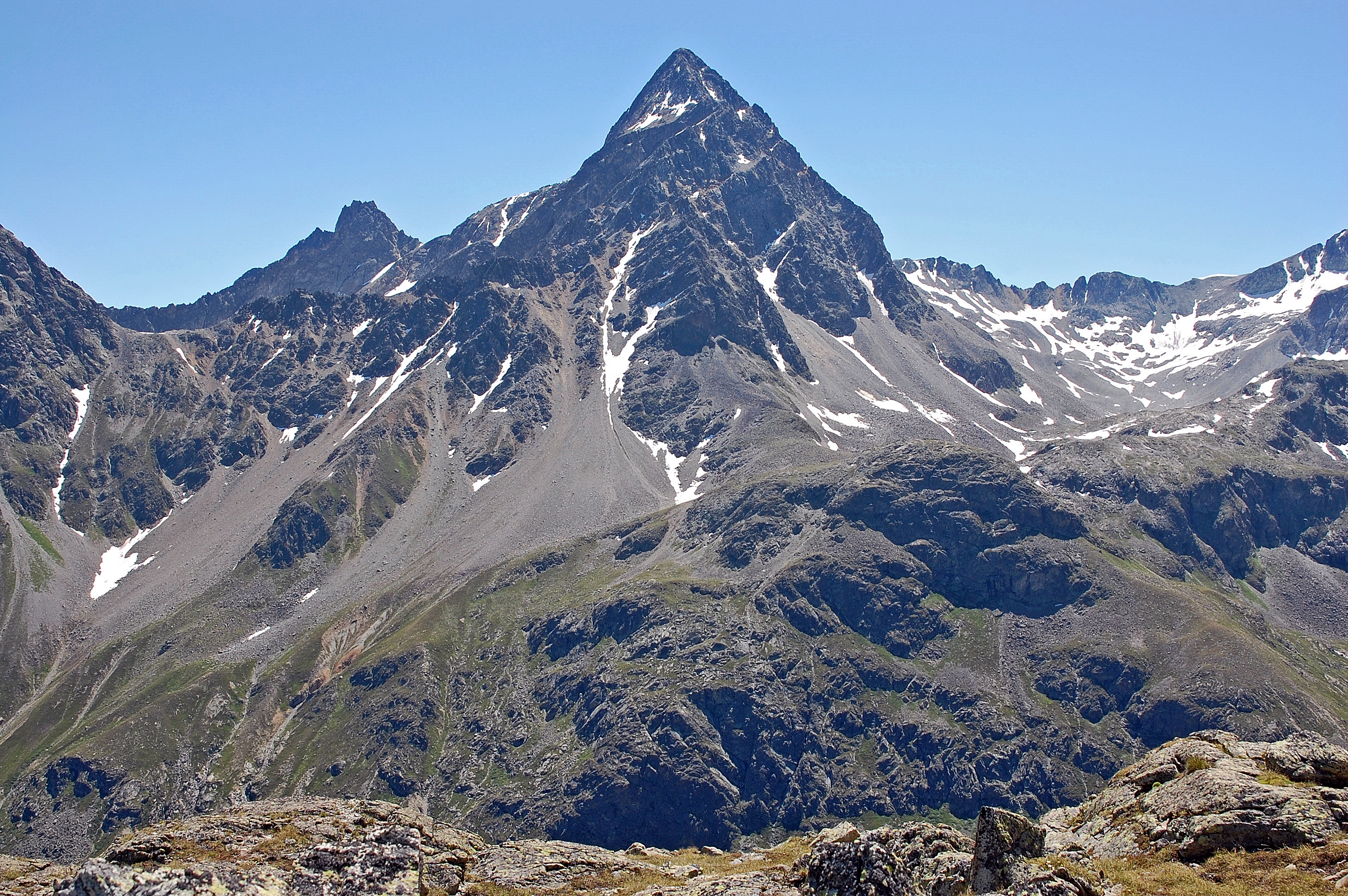
- View from Fuorcla Crap Alv (north side)

Highest point
- Elevation: 3,246 m (10,650 ft)
- Prominence: 631 m (2,070 ft)
- Parent peak: Piz Calderas
- Listing: Alpine mountains above 3000 m
- Coordinates: 46°32′35″N 9°48′36.5″E

Geography
- Location within Switzerland
- Location: Graubünden, Switzerland
- Parent range: Albula Alps

Piz Ot (Romansh: "high peak") is a mountain of the Albula Alps, located west of Samedan in the canton of Graubünden. Reaching a height of 3,246 metres above sea level, it is the culminating point of the range lying north of the Pass Suvretta.

The normal route to the summit starts from the heights of St. Moritz and Samedan, on the southern side of the mountain.
