= Piz Arpschella =

Mountain in Switzerland

- Location within Switzerland

Highest point
- Elevation: 3,032 m (9,948 ft)
- Prominence: 109 m (358 ft)
- Parent peak: Piz Vadret
- Coordinates: 46°43′7.2″N 10°00′37.1″E

Geography
- Location: Graubünden, Switzerland
- Parent range: Albula Alps

Piz Arpschella is a mountain of the Albula Alps, located west of Zernez in Graubünden. The mountain is situated between the Val Grialetsch and the Val Sarsura.
