= Bocktenhorn =

Mountain in Switzerland

- Location within Switzerland

Highest point
- Elevation: 3,044 m (9,987 ft)
- Prominence: 196 m (643 ft)
- Parent peak: Chüealphorn
- Coordinates: 46°42′25.5″N 9°54′9.5″E

Geography
- Location: Graubünden, Switzerland
- Parent range: Albula Alps

The Bocktenhorn is a mountain of the Albula Alps, located west of the Scaletta Pass, in Graubünden, Switzerland.
