= Jakobshorn =

Mountain in Switzerland

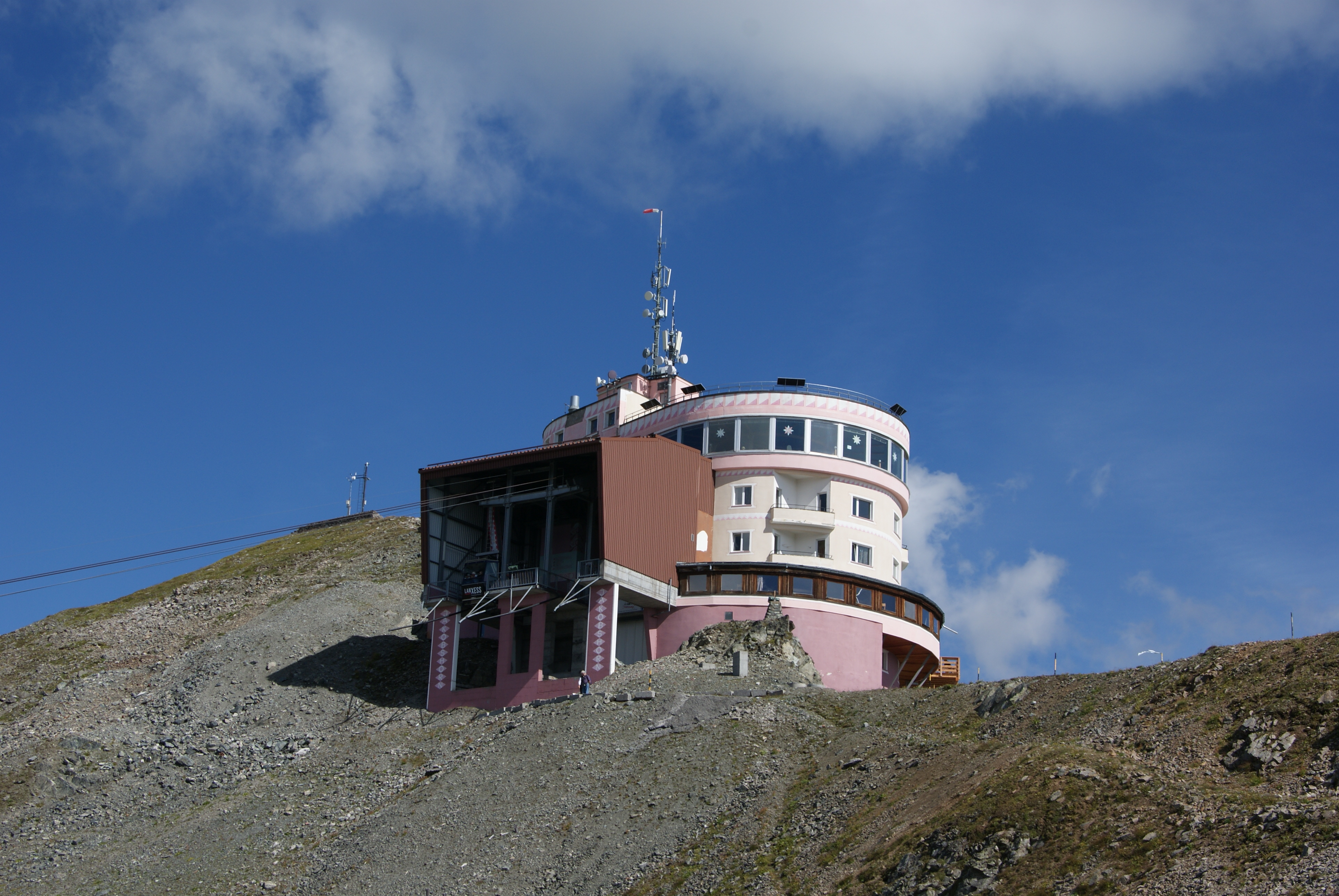
- The summit area

Highest point
- Elevation: 2,590 m (8,500 ft)
- Prominence: 40 m (130 ft)
- Parent peak: Piz Vadret
- Coordinates: 46°46′20.5″N 9°50′57.5″E

Geography
- Location within Switzerland
- Location: Graubünden, Switzerland
- Parent range: Albula Alps

The Jakobshorn (2,590 metres (8,500 ft)) is a mountain of the Albula Alps, overlooking Davos in the Swiss canton of Graubünden. It is also one of the five skiing regions of the Davos Klosters Mountains, offering fourteen pistes.

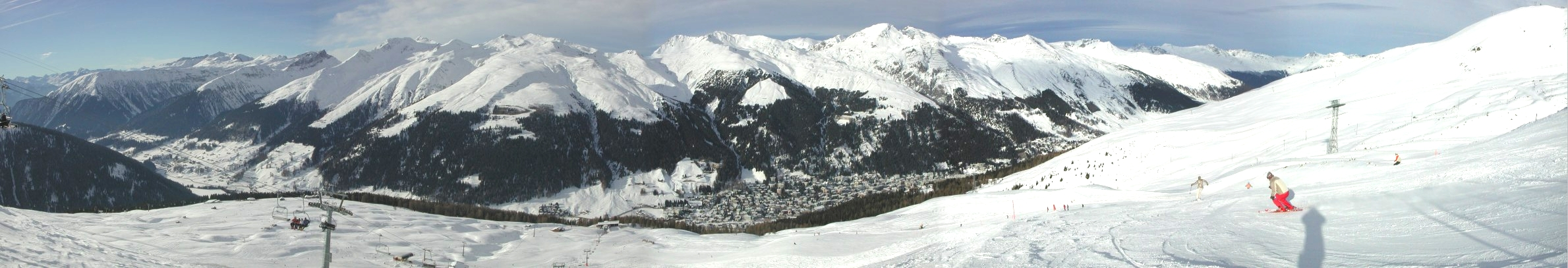
Jakobshorn panorama

Located at the northern end of the range between the Dischmatal and Sertigtal, the Jakobshorn is served by a two-part cable car running from Davos Platz. Once on the mountain there are three chairlifts, one short cable car, and one T-Bar. Since 1995 there has also been a two-person chairlift, running from near the base station to the near the bottom of Usser Isch.

There are a variety of pistes on the Jakobshorn—blue, red and black—and the mountain is renowned for being a centre for snowboarding; Bolgen provides an illuminated super pipe.

Pistes are very wide and the area is popular with novice skiers; there are however a number of black terrains for the more adventurous skier. The main two lifts also open during the summer, from July through October, and there are many walks on the Jakobshorn.

The Jakobshorn is also a favoured take-off point for hang-gliders and snowkiters.

== See also ==
- List of mountains of Switzerland accessible by public transport
