= Porchabella Glacier =

Glacier in Switzerland

- Vadret da Porchabella
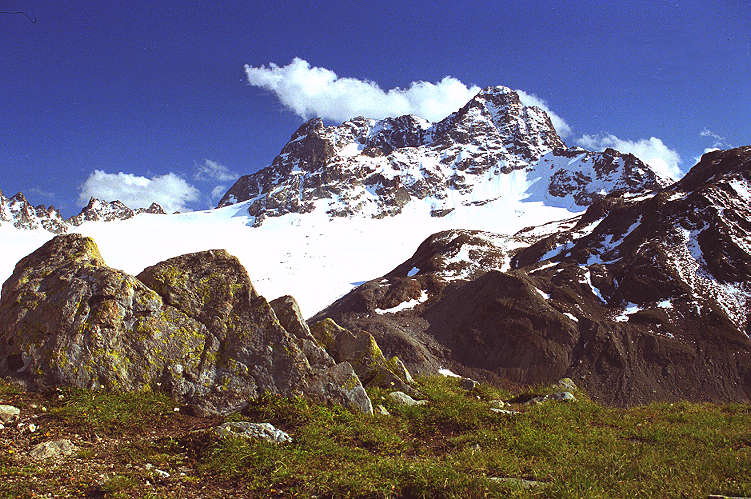
- Porchabella Glacier and Piz Kesch
- Interactive map of Porchabella Glacier
- Type: Valley glacier
- Location: Graubünden, Switzerland
- Coordinates: 46°37′46″N 9°52′50″E
- Area: 2.58 km^{2}
- Length: 2.5 km

The Porchabella Glacier (Romansh: Vadret da Porchabella) is a 2.5 km long glacier (2005) in the Albula Range in the canton of Graubünden in Switzerland. In 1973 it had an area of 2.58 km^{2}.

The glacier lies at the foot of Piz Kesch and Piz Val Müra. It gives birth to the river Ava da Salect which ends in the Albula.

== Human remains ==
In 1988, the remains of a presumed dairymaid were discovered and completely unearthed in 1992. Only the shoulders and left arm were mummified, although the rest of the skeleton was fully intact. Examination concluded that the remains dated from around 1700, and the woman being around twenty-two at the time of her death.

== See also ==
- List of glaciers in Switzerland
- Swiss Alps
