= Piz Bial =

Mountain in Switzerland

- Location within Switzerland

Highest point
- Elevation: 3,061 m (10,043 ft)
- Prominence: 113 m (371 ft)
- Parent peak: Piz Calderas
- Coordinates: 46°33′32.2″N 9°45′22.4″E

Geography
- Location: Graubünden, Switzerland
- Parent range: Albula Alps

Piz Bial is a mountain of the Albula Alps, located in Graubünden, Switzerland. It is situated between the Val Mulix and the Val Bever. The closest locality is Preda, on the Albula Railway.
