= Piz Üertsch =

Mountain in Switzerland

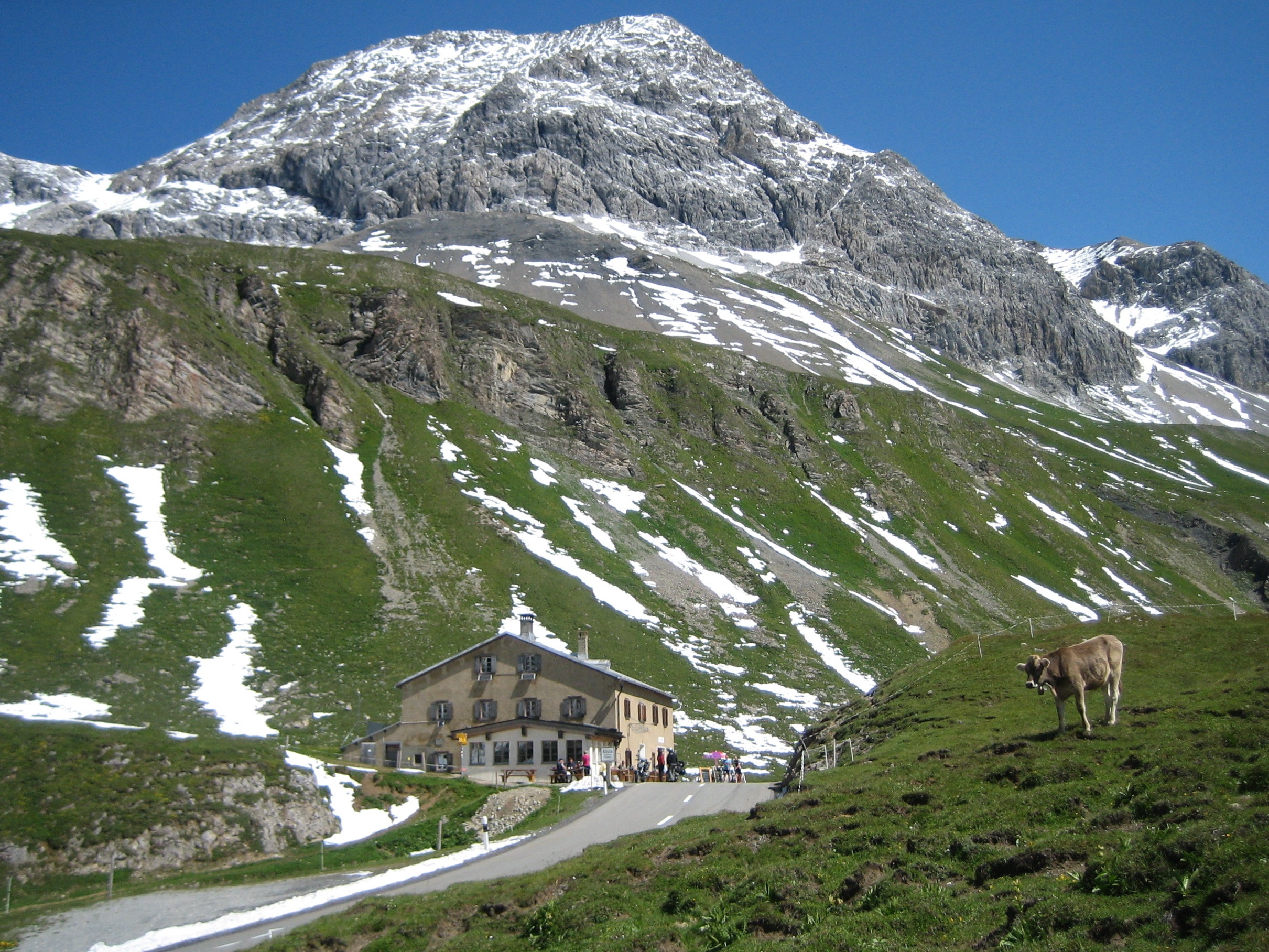
- View from the Albula Pass

Highest point
- Elevation: 3,268 m (10,722 ft)
- Prominence: 397 m (1,302 ft)
- Parent peak: Piz Kesch
- Listing: Alpine mountains above 3000 m
- Coordinates: 46°35′47.3″N 9°50′9.1″E

Geography
- Location within Switzerland
- Location: Graubünden, Switzerland
- Parent range: Albula Alps

Piz Üertsch is a mountain of the Albula Alps, overlooking the Albula Pass, in the Swiss canton of Graubünden. It is located south-west of Piz Kesch.
