= Piz Forun =

Mountain in Switzerland

- Location within Switzerland

Highest point
- Elevation: 3,052 m (10,013 ft)
- Prominence: 458 m (1,503 ft)
- Parent peak: Piz Kesch
- Listing: Alpine mountains above 3000 m
- Coordinates: 46°39′19.2″N 9°51′53.9″E

Geography
- Location: Graubünden, Switzerland
- Parent range: Albula Alps

Piz Forun is a mountain of the Albula Alps, located east of Bergün in the canton of Graubünden.
