= Dörfli =

Dörfli (Swiss German for ″little village″) may refer to:

- Dörfli (Oberried am Brienzersee), a settlement in the municipality of Oberried am Brienzersee, in the Swiss canton of Bern
- Dörfli (Silenen), a hamlet in the municipality of Silenen in the Swiss canton of Uri
- Dörfli (Wolfenschiessen), a settlement in the municipality of Wolfenschiessen in the Swiss canton of Nidwalden
- Sertig Dörfli, a settlement in the municipality of Davos, in the Swiss canton of Graubünden

See also

- Dörfli railway station
