= Piz d'Err =

Mountain in Switzerland

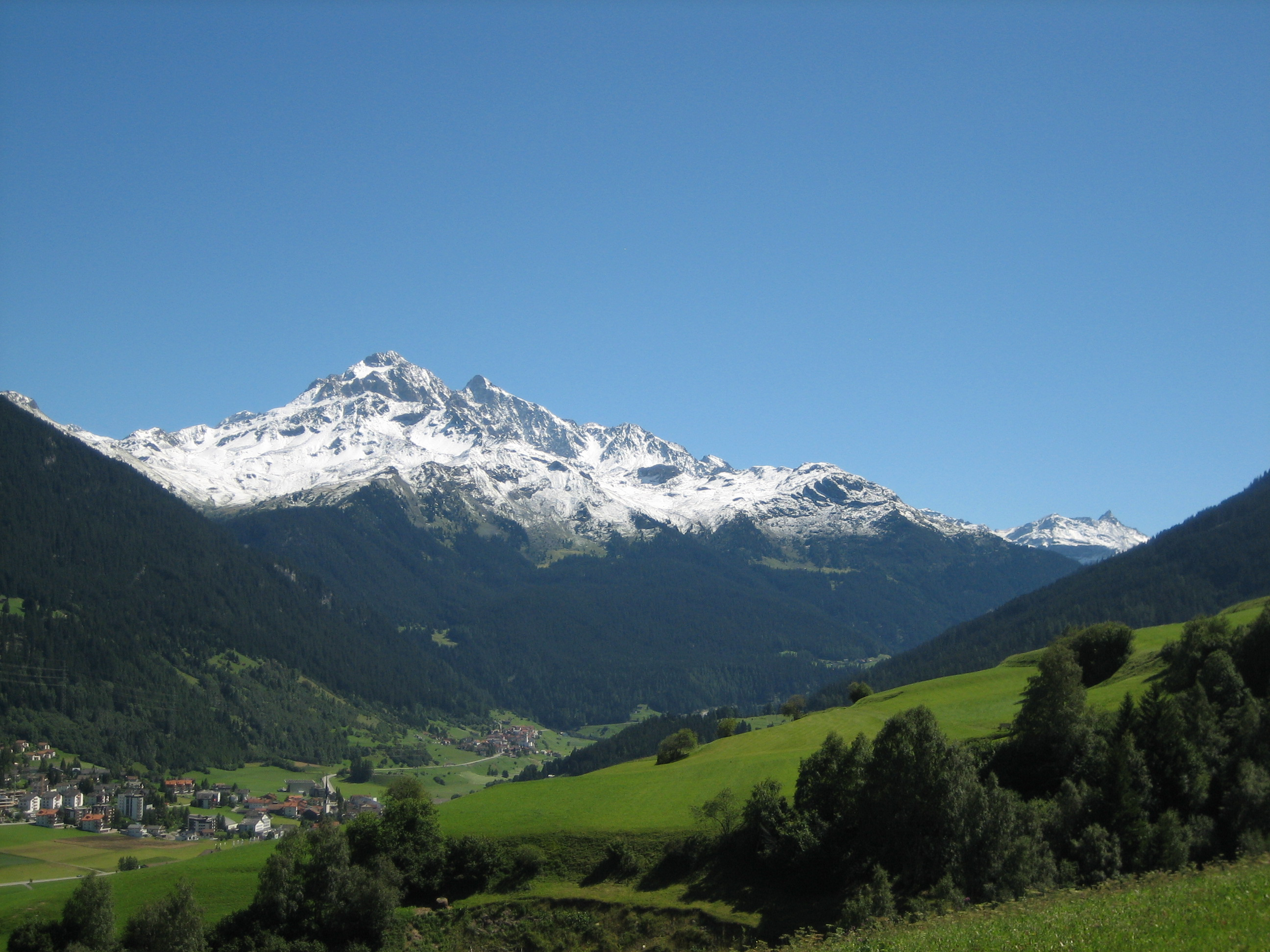
- Piz d'Err from Savognin

Highest point
- Elevation: 3,378 m (11,083 ft)
- Prominence: 153 m (502 ft)
- Parent peak: Piz Calderas
- Listing: Mountains of Switzerland
- Coordinates: 46°32′43.3″N 9°41′29.5″E

Geography
- Location within Switzerland
- Location: Graubünden, Switzerland
- Parent range: Albula Range

Piz d'Err is a mountain of the Albula Alps, overlooking Mulegns in the canton of Graubünden. It lies 1 km north of Piz Calderas.

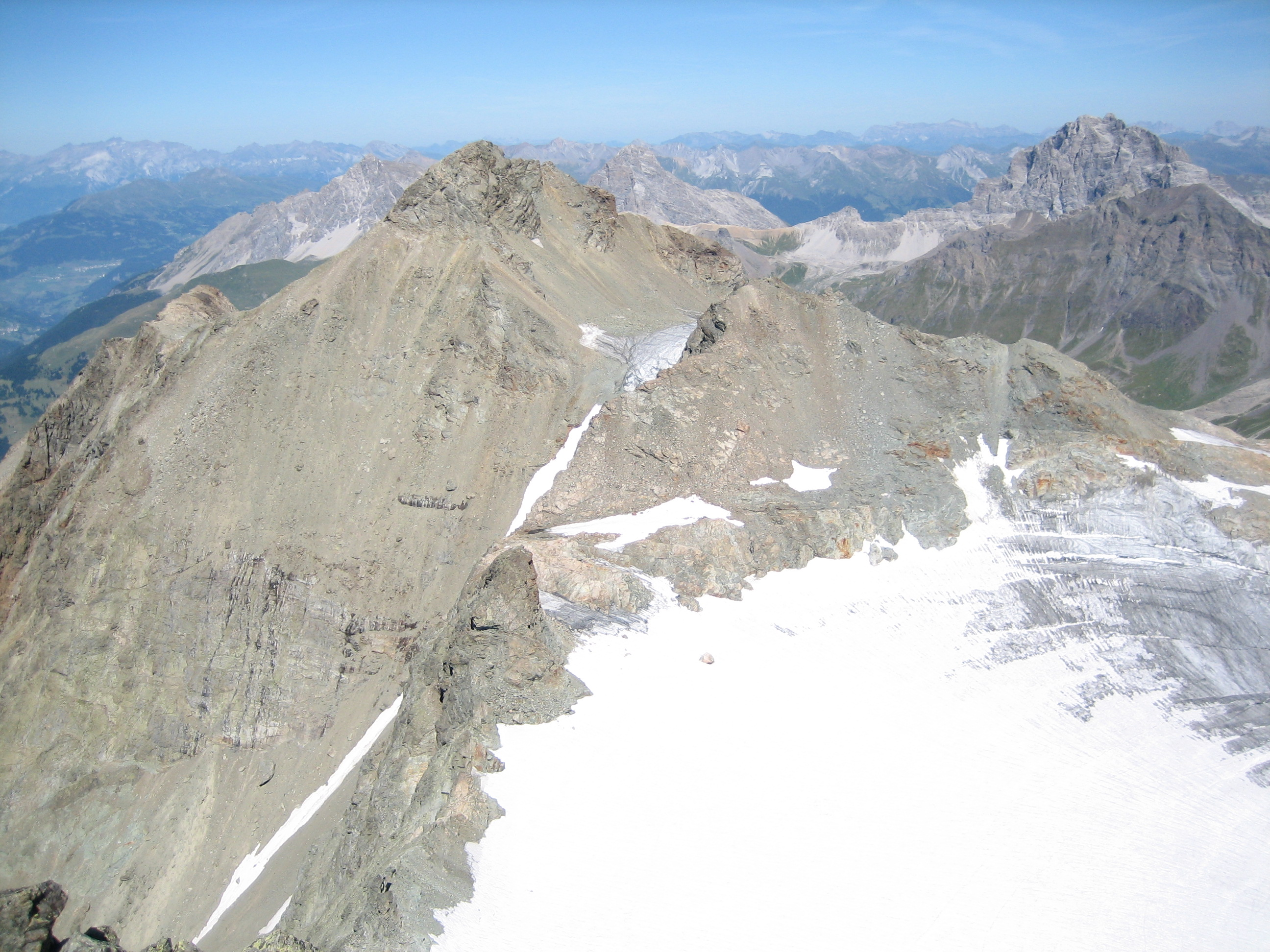
Piz d'Err from Piz Calderas
