= Piz Sarsura =

Mountain in Switzerland

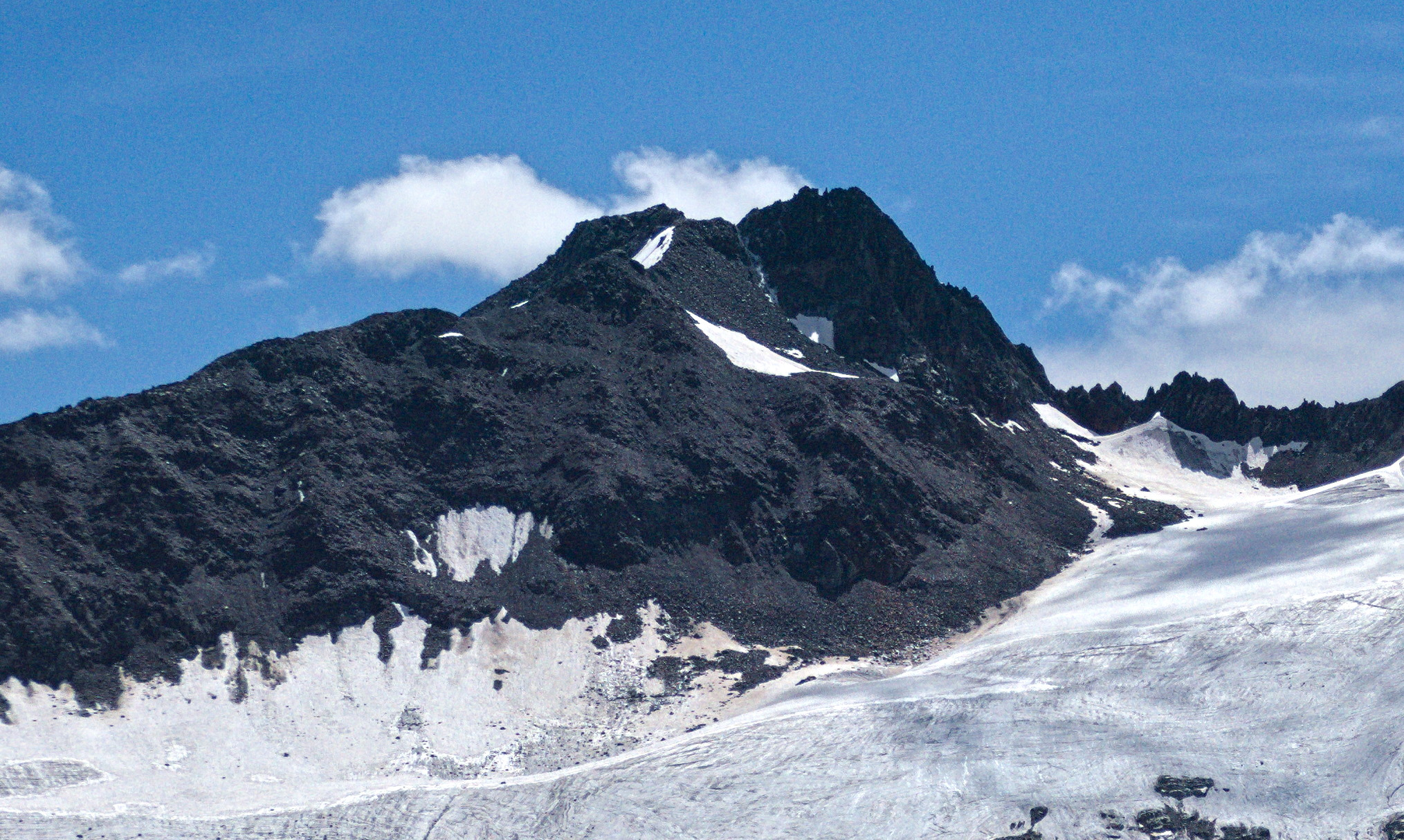
- Piz Sarsura

Highest point
- Elevation: 3,178 m (10,427 ft)
- Prominence: 164 m (538 ft)
- Parent peak: Piz Vadret
- Coordinates: 46°41′30.4″N 9°59′44.1″E

Geography
- Location within Switzerland
- Location: Graubünden, Switzerland
- Parent range: Albula Alps

Piz Sarsura is a mountain of the Albula Alps, located east of Piz Vadret in Graubünden, Switzerland. It overlooks two glaciers: the Vadret da Grialetsch on its north-west side and the Vadret da Sarsura on its north-east side. The closest mountain hut is the Chamanna da Grialetsch, on the north side.
