= Piz Val Müra =

Mountain in Switzerland

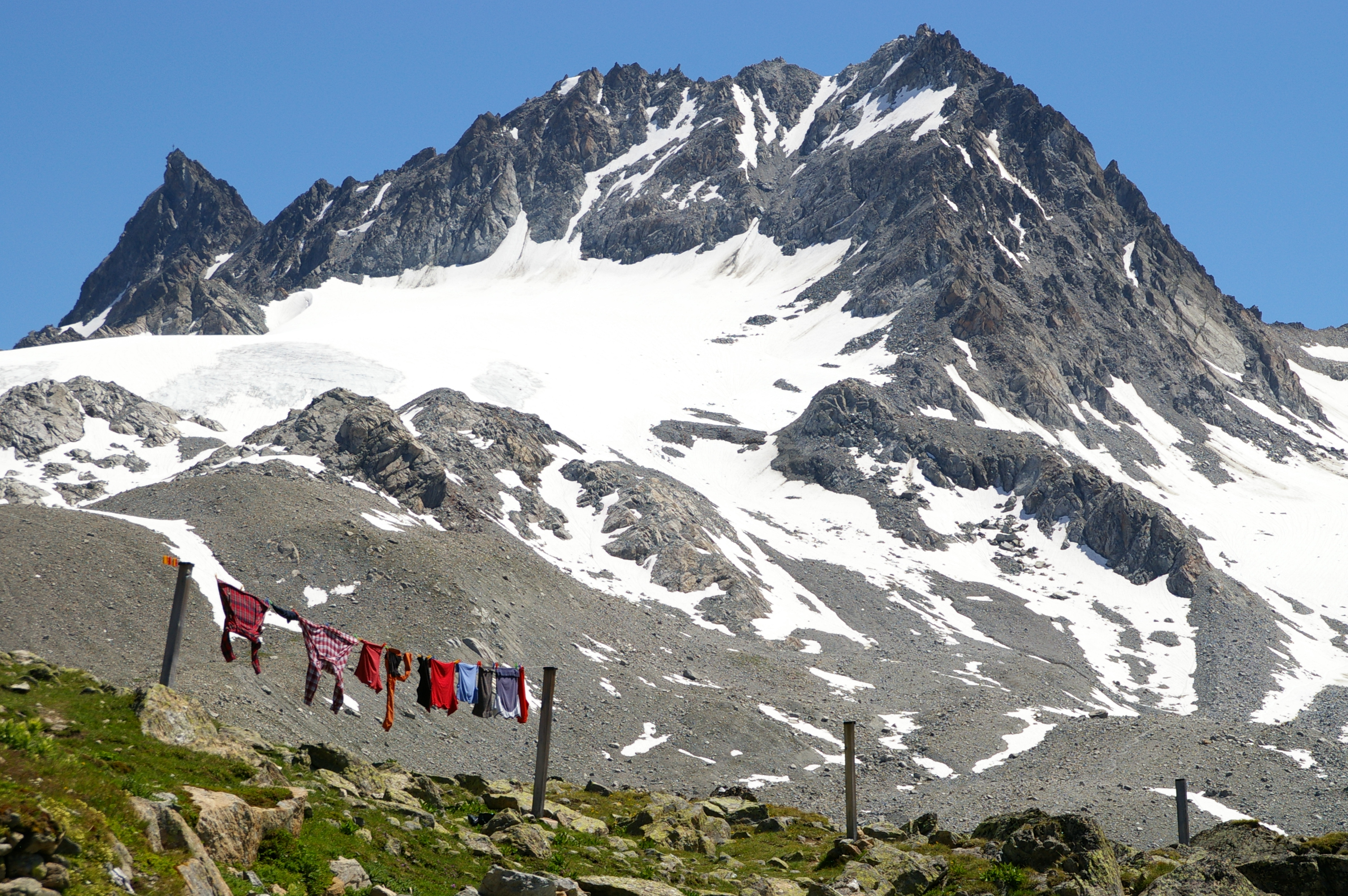

Highest point
- Elevation: 3,162 m (10,374 ft)
- Prominence: 154 m (505 ft)
- Parent peak: Piz Kesch
- Coordinates: 46°37′39.9″N 9°54′4.5″E

Geography
- Location within Switzerland
- Location: Graubünden, Switzerland
- Parent range: Albula Alps

Piz Val Müra is a mountain of the Albula Alps, located east of Piz Kesch in the canton of Graubünden.

The closest localities are Zuoz and Madulain.
