= Hoch Ducan =

Mountain in Switzerland

- Piz Ducan
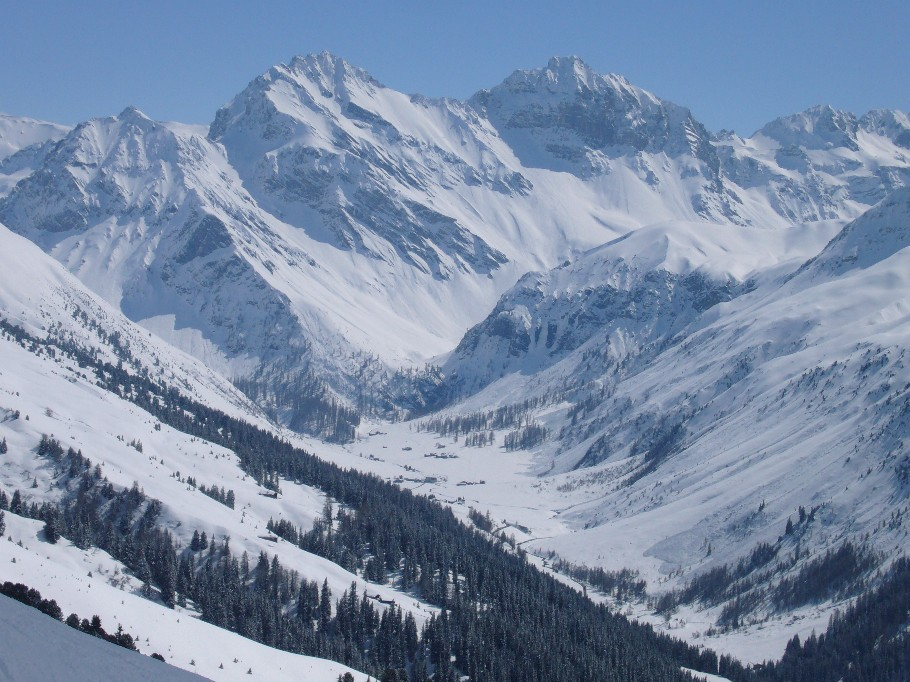
- Hoch Ducan (right peak) from the north side

Highest point
- Elevation: 3,063 m (10,049 ft)
- Prominence: 324 m (1,063 ft)
- Parent peak: Chüealphorn
- Coordinates: 46°41′22.4″N 9°51′5.9″E

Geography
- Location within Switzerland
- Location: Graubünden, Switzerland
- Parent range: Albula Range

The Hoch Ducan (also known as Piz Ducan) is a mountain in the Albula Range, located in Graubünden, Switzerland.
