= Sertig =

Valley in Switzerland

Coordinates: 46°43′33″N 9°50′55″E

The Sertig Valley is located in the municipality of Davos, south of the town, in the Swiss canton of Graubünden. It is a lateral valley of the Landwasser valley. The small village of Sertig Dörfli (at 1,861 m) is accessible by road.

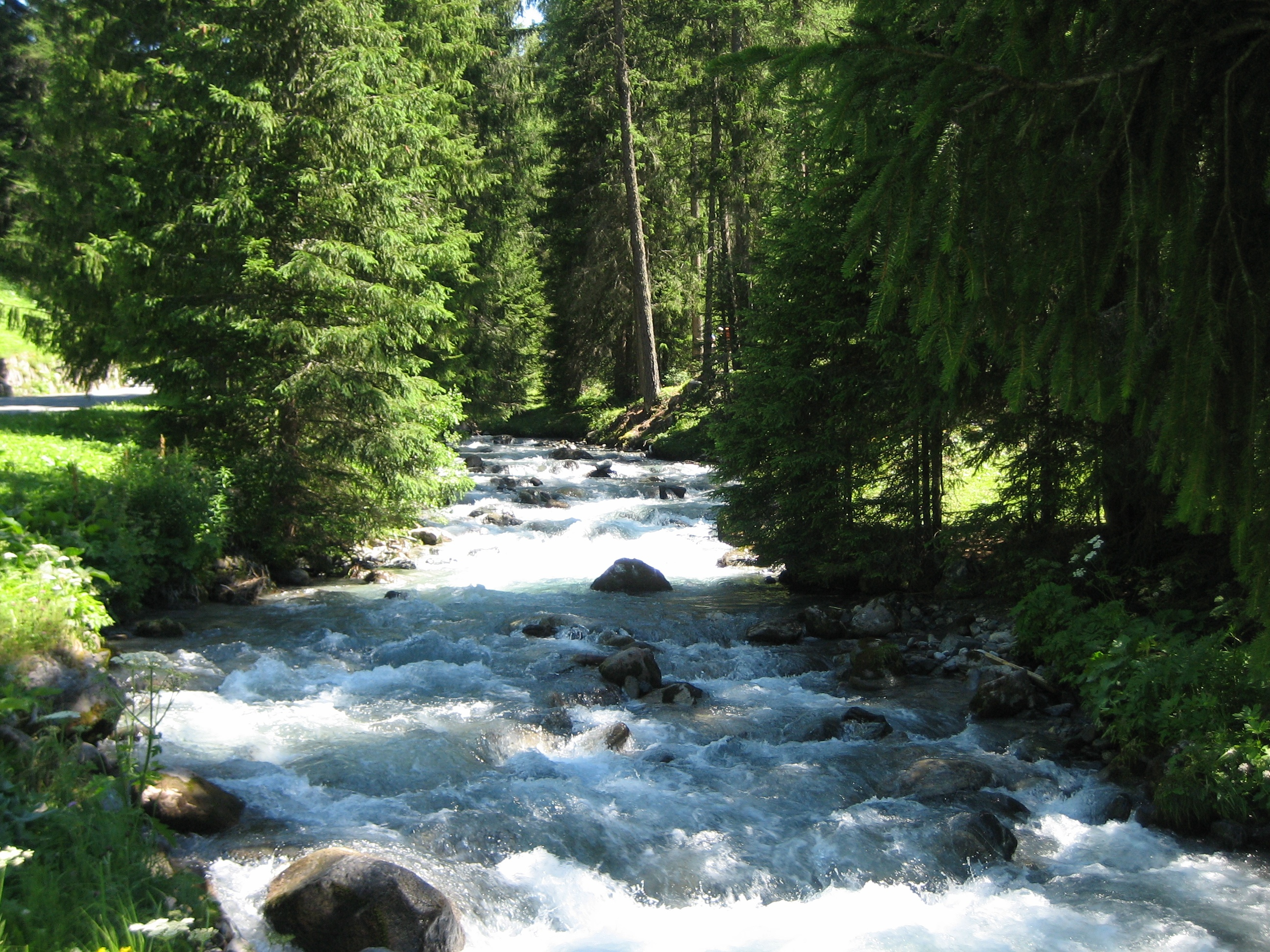
Sertig river

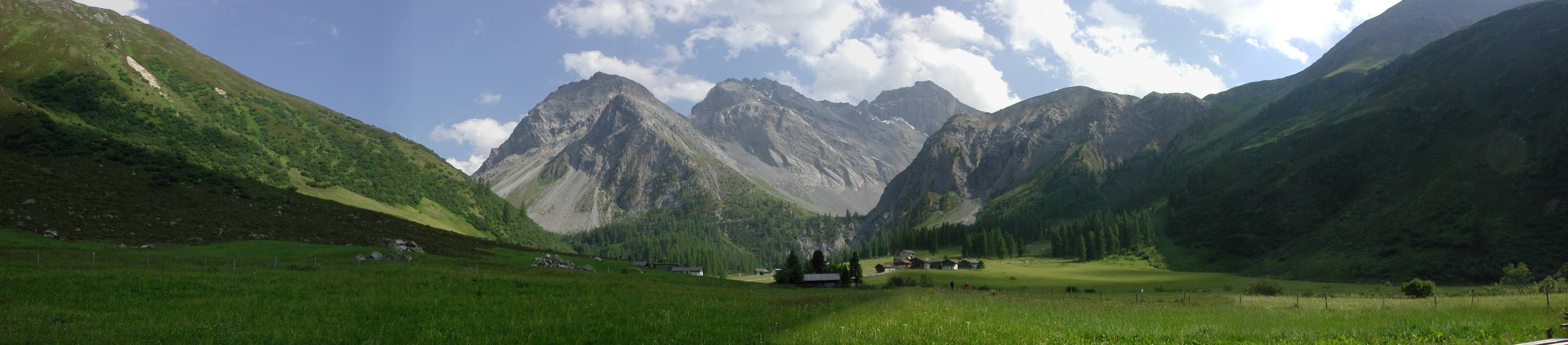
Panorama at the end of the valley with the massifs of the Mittaghorn, the Plattenfluh and the Hoch Ducan
