= Chüealphorn =

Mountain in Switzerland

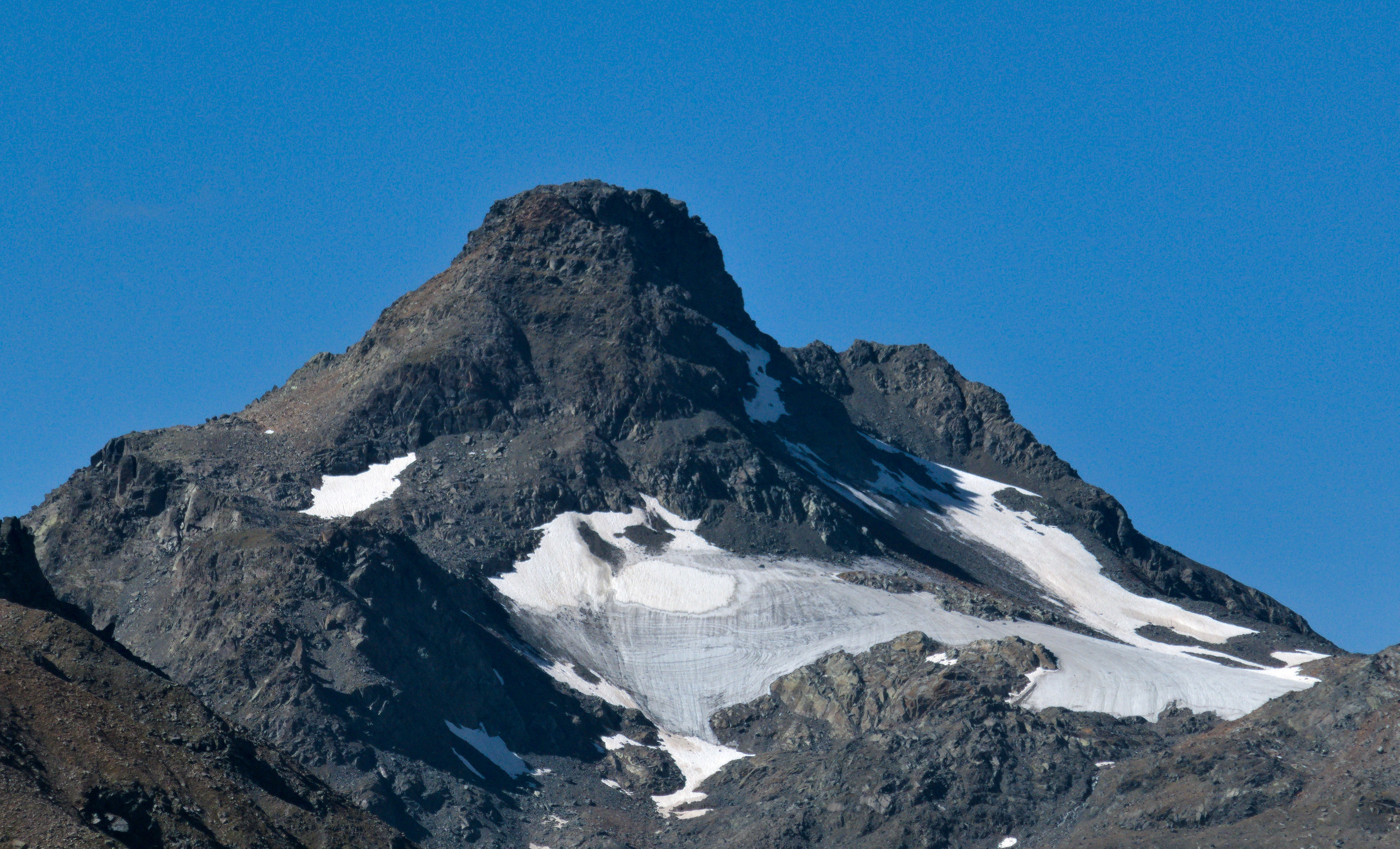

Highest point
- Elevation: 3,078 m (10,098 ft)
- Prominence: 472 m (1,549 ft)
- Parent peak: Piz Vadret
- Listing: Alpine mountains above 3000 m
- Coordinates: 46°41′7.2″N 9°54′19.4″E

Geography
- Location within Switzerland
- Location: Graubünden, Switzerland
- Parent range: Albula Alps

The Chüealphorn is a mountain of the Albula Alps, overlooking the Scaletta Pass, in Graubünden, Switzerland.
