= Albula Pass =

Swiss mountain pass

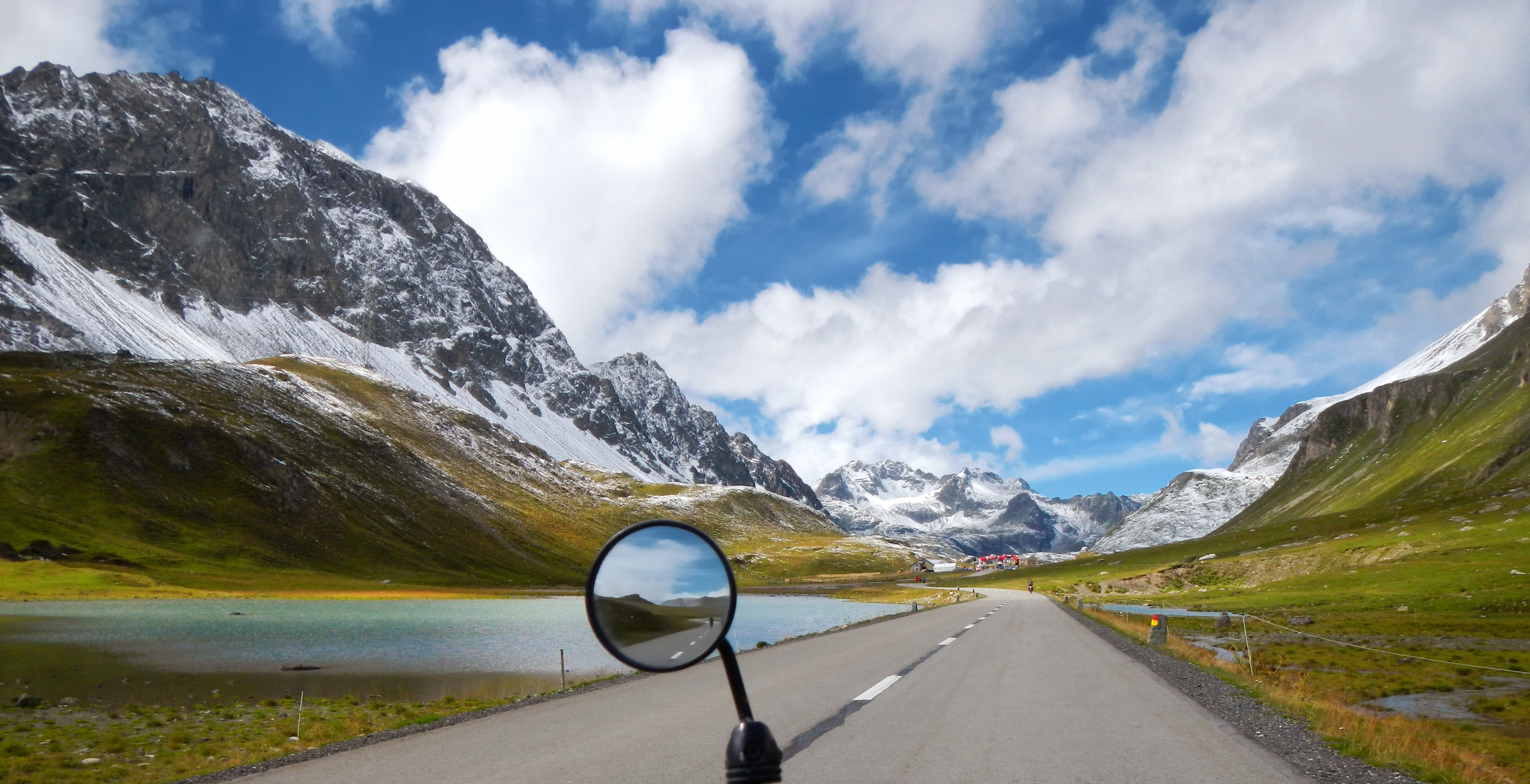
- Approaching the summit from the east

- Location within Switzerland
- Elevation: 2,312 metres (7,585 ft)
- Traversed by: Paved road Railway tunnel

Third Approach
- Location: Graubünden, Switzerland
- Range: Albula Alps
- Coordinates: 46°35′N 09°53′E

The Albula Pass (Romansh: Pass d'Alvra or Pass da l'Alvra, German: Albulapass) (el. 2312 m) is a Swiss mountain pass in the canton of Graubünden. It lies at the heart of the Albula Alps, on the watershed between the Albula, tributary of the Rhine and the Ova d'Alvra, tributary of the Inn. Overlooking the pass are the ranges of Piz Üertsch (north) and Crasta Mora (south).

The Albula Pass is an important axis from central Graubünden to Engadin. It is traversed by a paved road from Thusis to La Punt, via Bergün. It is also traversed by the Albula Railway, although at a lower elevation through the Albula Tunnel (1,820 m), from Thusis to Bever, also via Bergün.

On the summit of the pass is a hospice. East of the pass, on the Engadin side, is a lake named Albulasee (2,294 m) which is 4.2 ha large. West of the pass, at a further distance, is the larger Lai da Palpuogna, a popular stop on the Albula road.

The Albula Pass is one of the three paved road passes connecting the Engadin with the northern Grisons, the two other being the Julier Pass and the Flüela Pass.

In June 2025, a memorial sculpture was unveiled on the Albula Pass in memory of Swiss cyclist Gino Mäder. Mäder died following a crash on the descent of the Albula Pass during Stage 5 of the 2023 Tour de Suisse. The inauguration of the sculpture took place ahead of Stage 5 of the 2025 edition of the race, in a ceremony attended by Mäder’s family, friends, team representatives, and race organisers. The sculpture, titled Connected, was created by artist Gügi Eugster, Mäder’s uncle.

Albula Pass

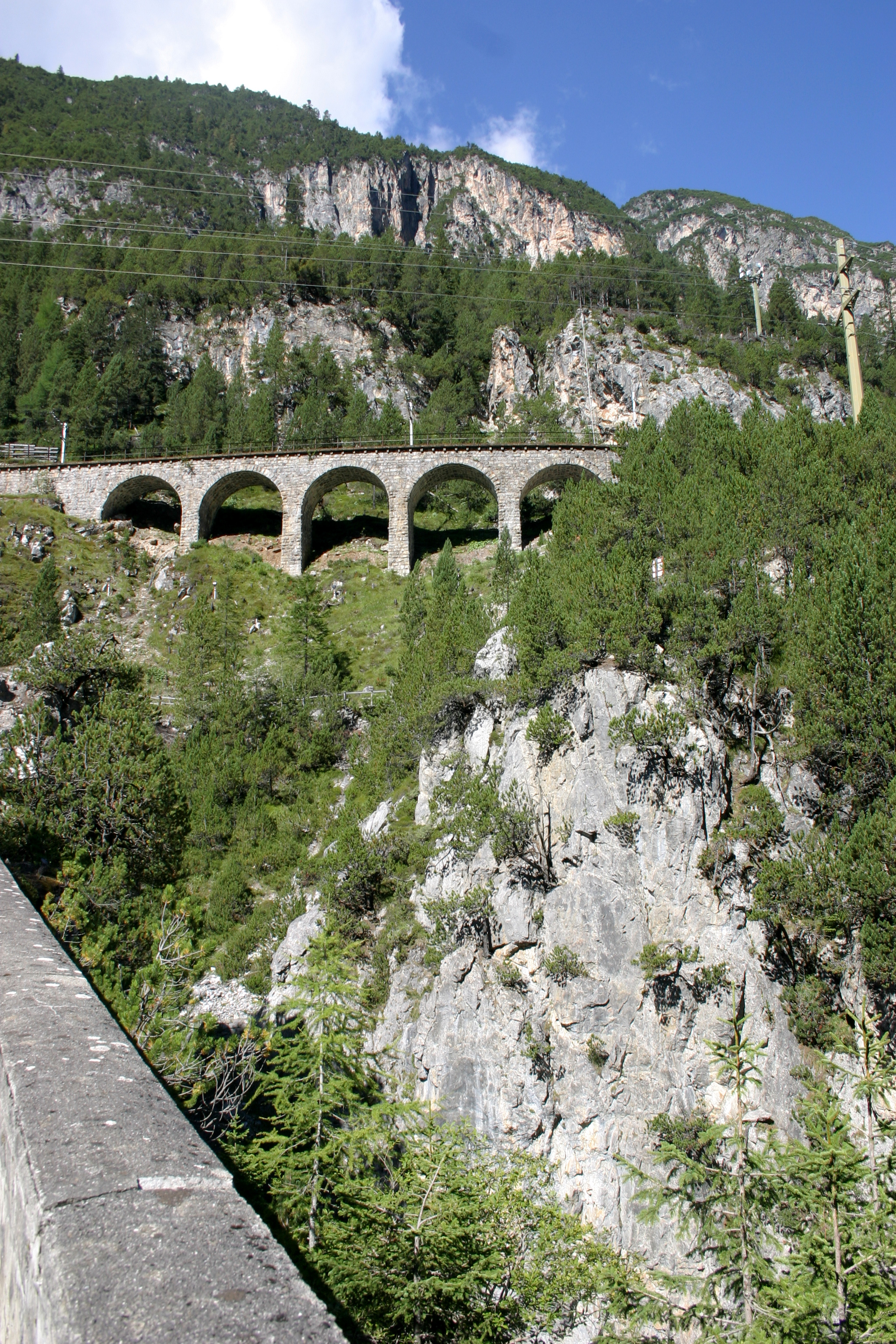
Albula Railway

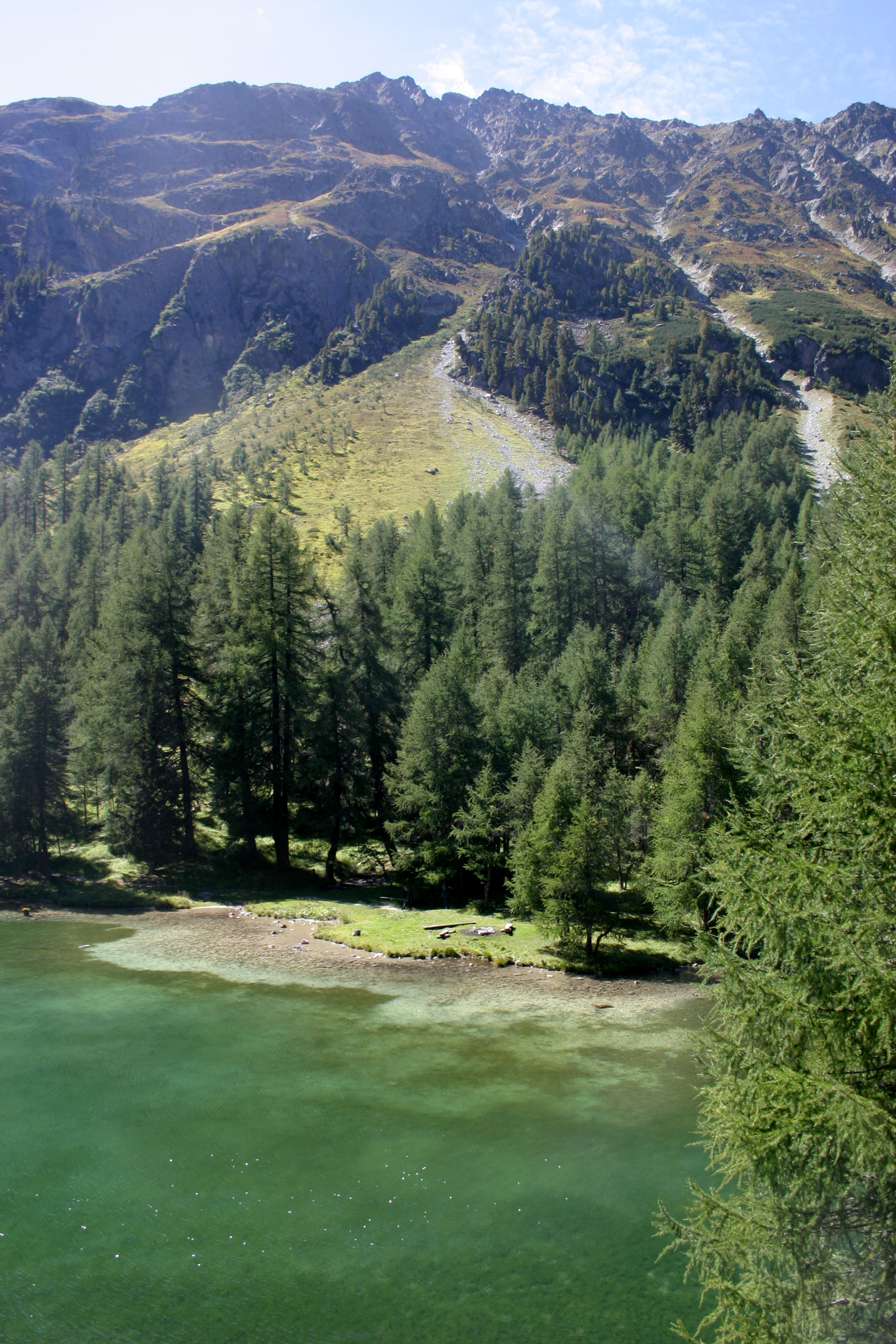
Lai da Palpuogna

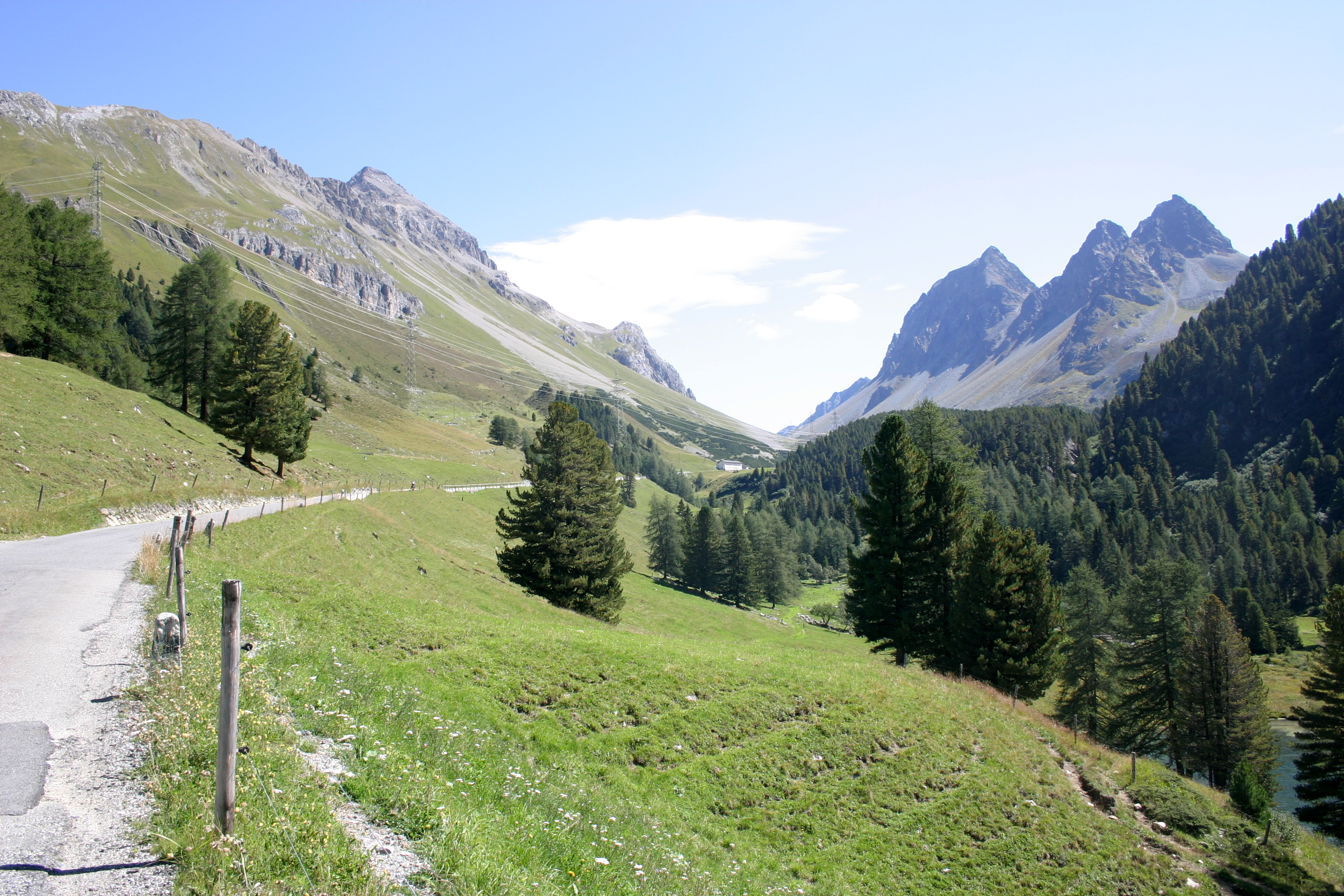

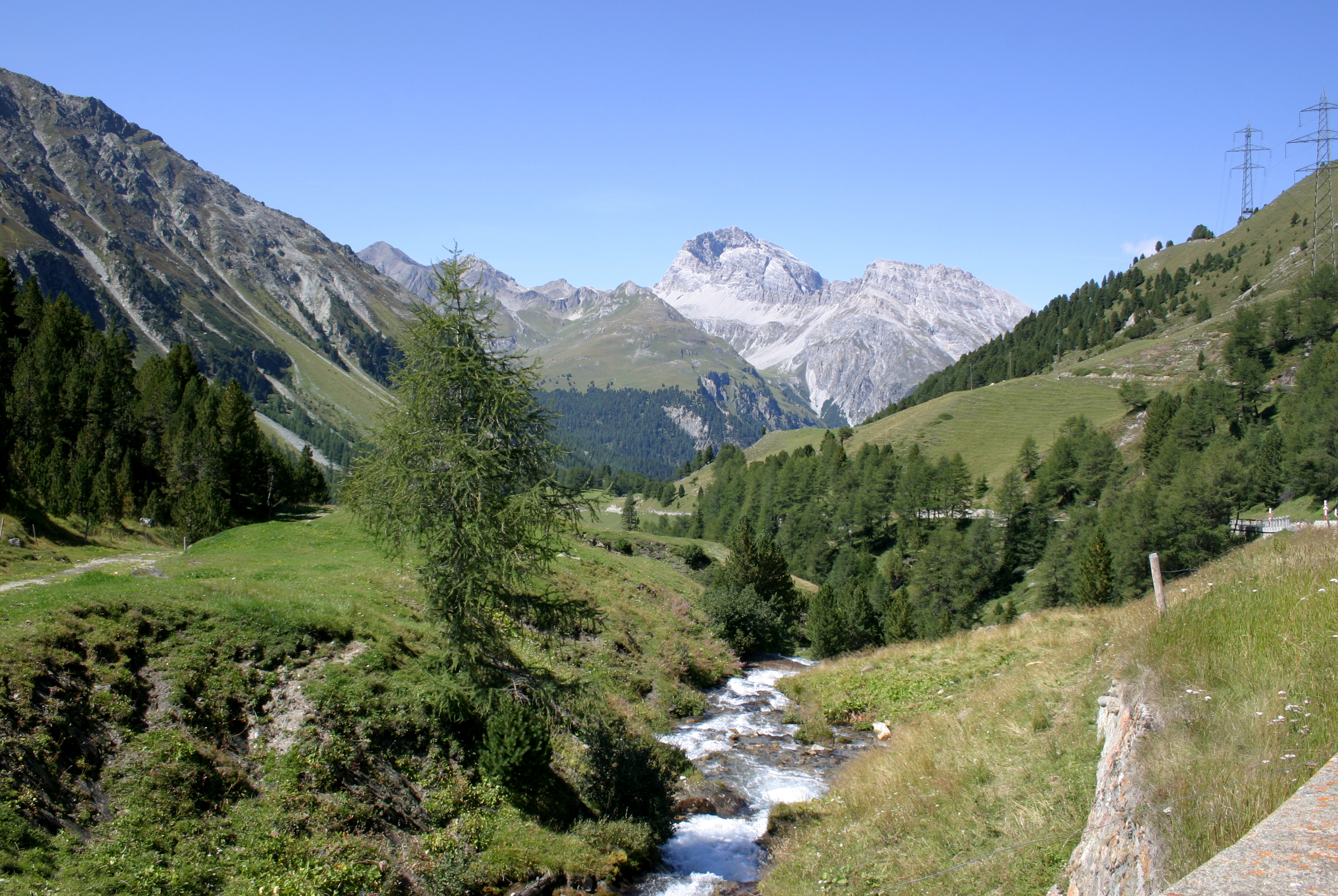

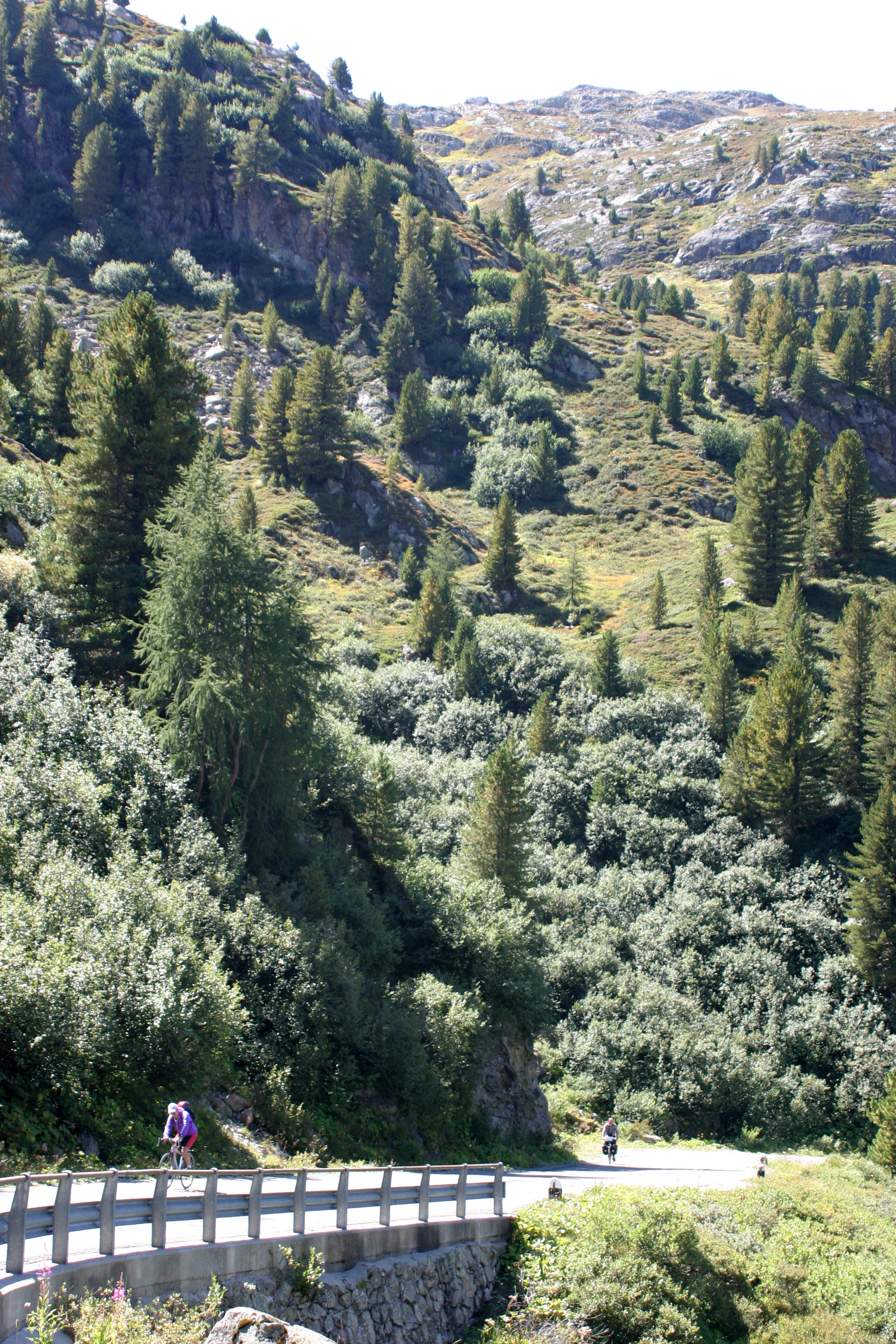

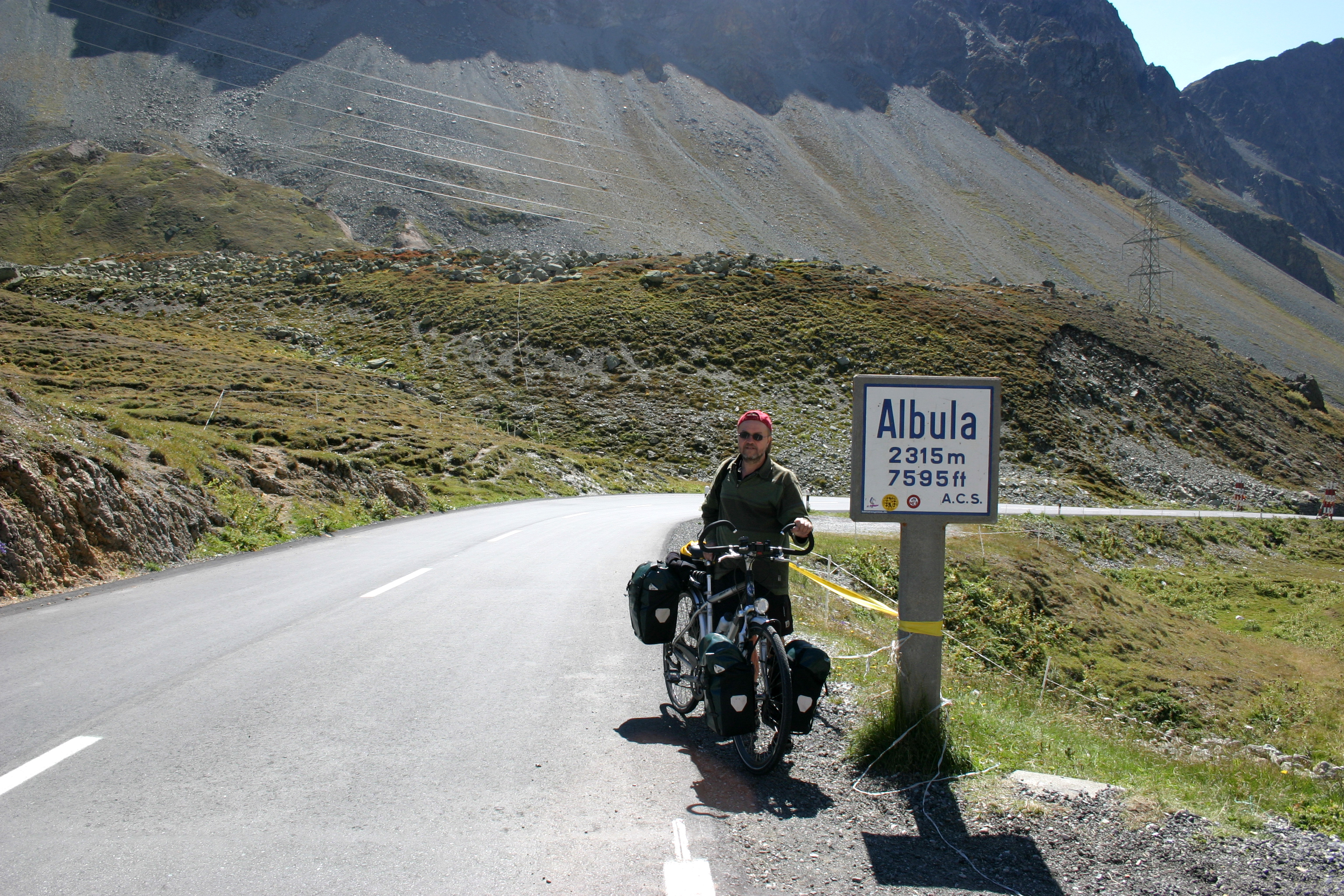

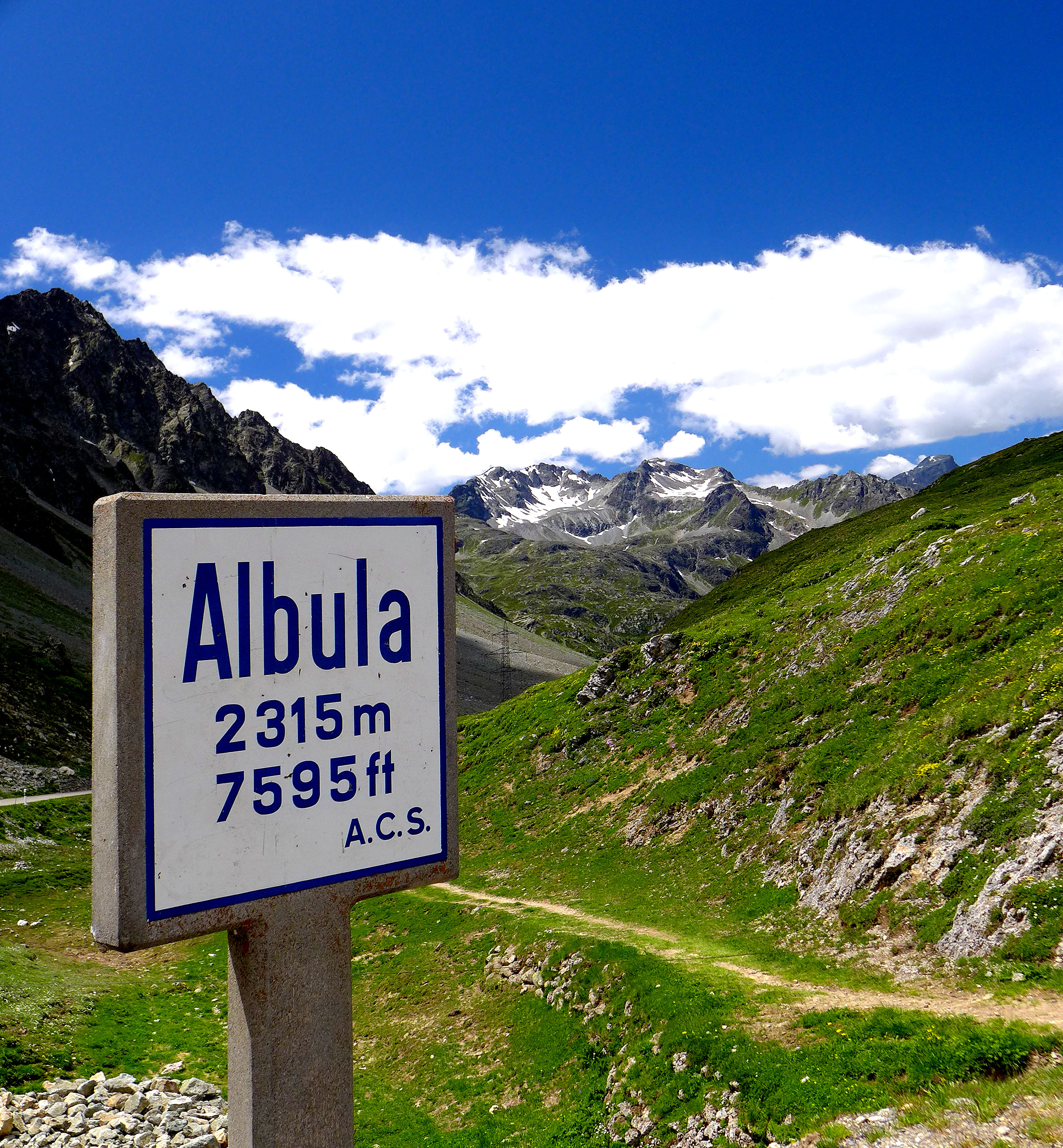
Old road sign on the top

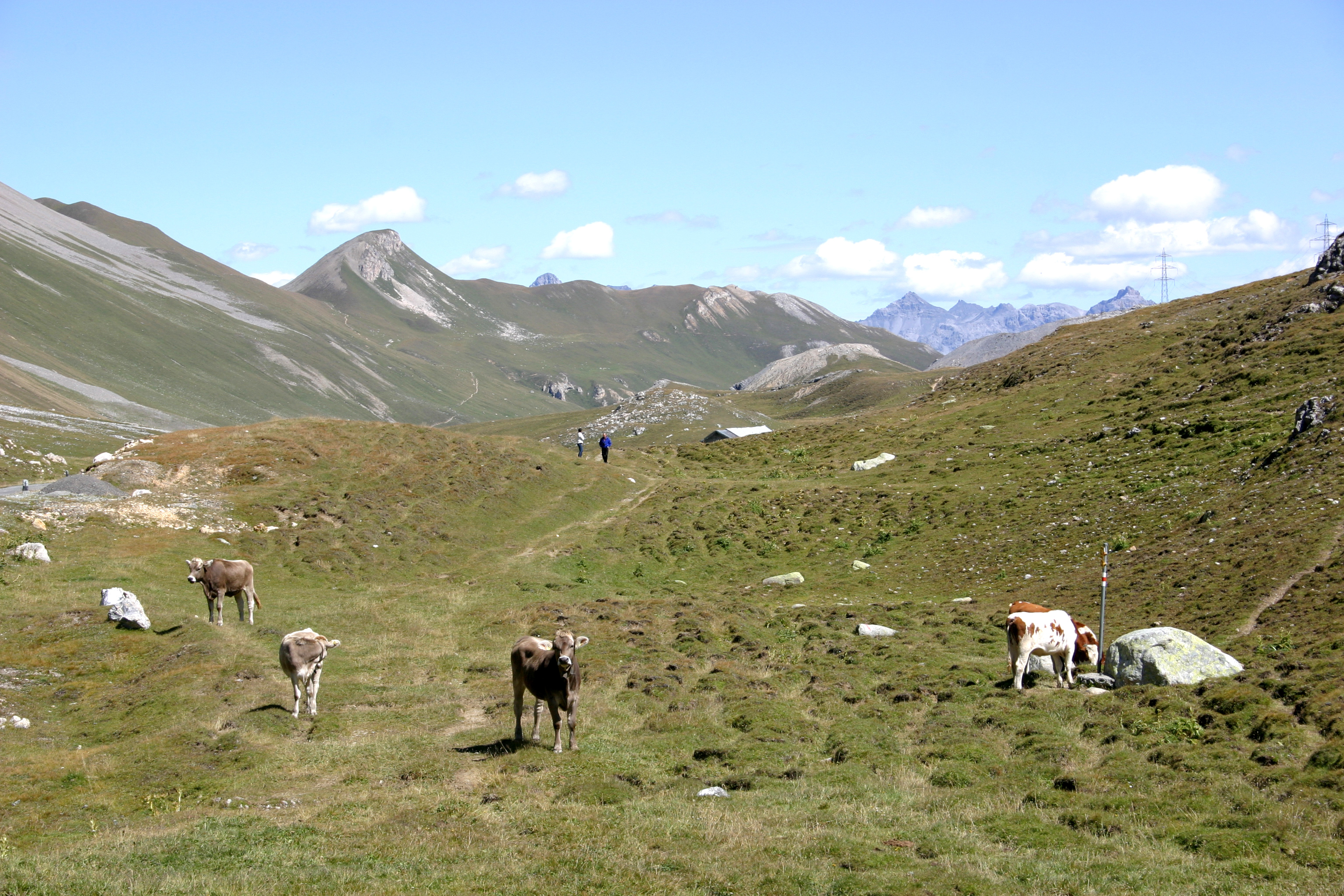

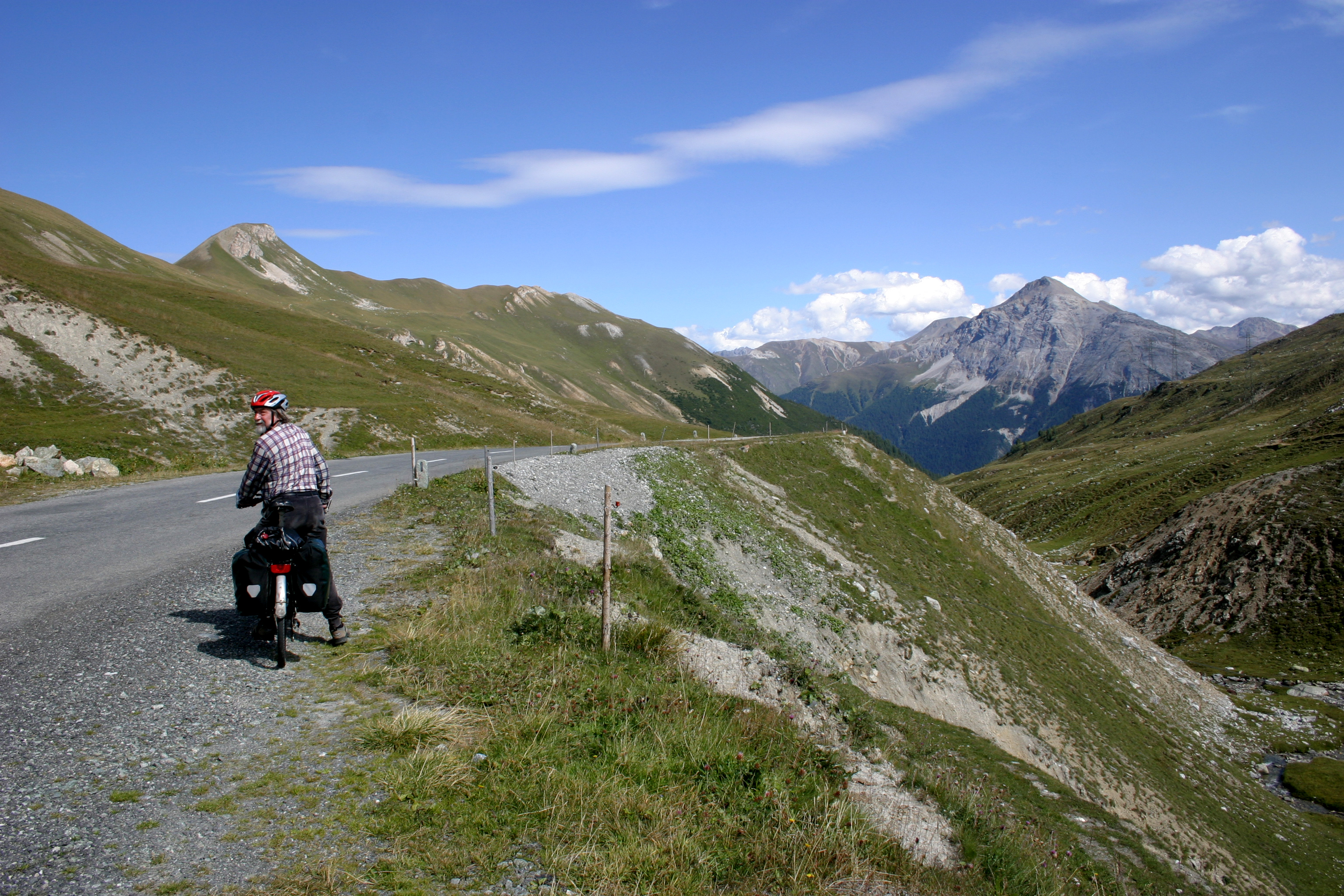

== See also ==
- List of highest paved roads in Switzerland
- List of highest road passes in Switzerland
