= Piz Calderas =

Mountain in Switzerland

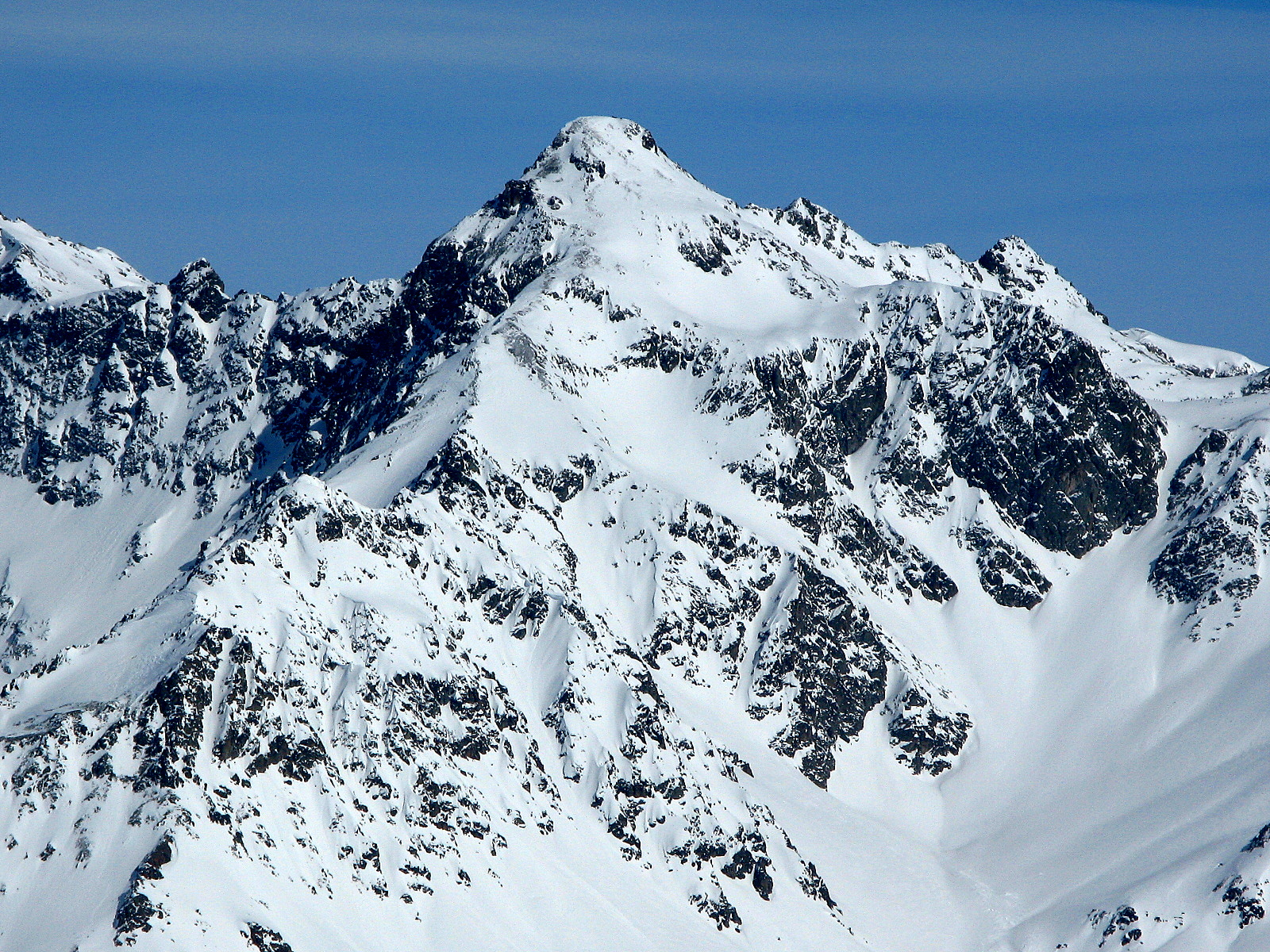
- View from the south-west

Highest point
- Elevation: 3,397 m (11,145 ft)
- Prominence: 1,085 m (3,560 ft)
- Parent peak: Piz Kesch
- Isolation: 16.5 km (10.3 mi)
- Listing: Alpine mountains above 3000 m
- Coordinates: 46°32′11.1″N 09°41′45.6″E

Geography
- Location within Switzerland
- Location: Graubünden, Switzerland
- Parent range: Albula Alps

Piz Calderas is a mountain of the Albula Alps, overlooking Mulegns in the canton of Graubünden. It is the highest summit of the group located between the Julier and Albula Pass. On its east side lies the Val Bever.

== See also ==
- List of mountains of Graubünden
- List of most isolated mountains of Switzerland
