= Piz Vadret =

Mountain in Switzerland

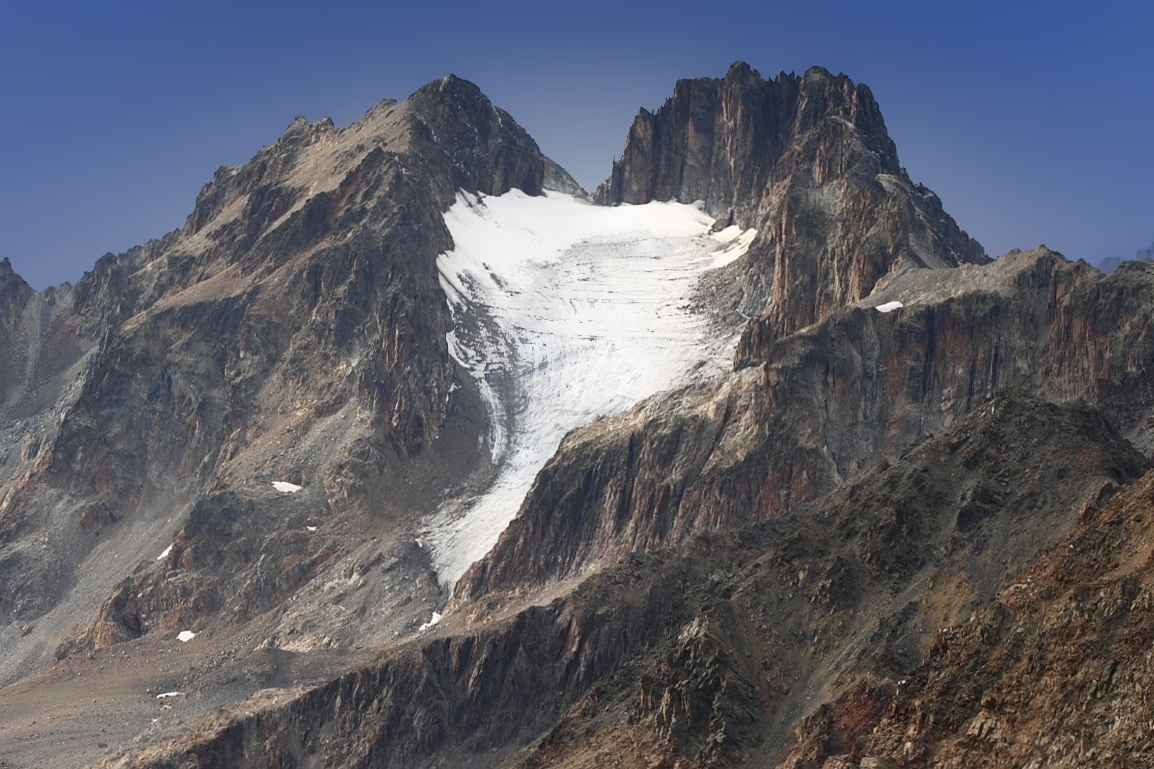
- Piz Vadret

Highest point
- Elevation: 3,229 m (10,594 ft)
- Prominence: 659 m (2,162 ft)
- Parent peak: Piz Kesch
- Isolation: 9.7 km (6.0 mi)
- Listing: Alpine mountains above 3000 m
- Coordinates: 46°41′13.4″N 9°57′45.5″E

Geography
- Location within Switzerland
- Location: Graubünden, Switzerland
- Parent range: Albula Alps

Piz Vadret is a mountain of the Albula Alps, in Graubünden. With an altitude of 3,229 metres above sea level, Piz Vadret is the highest mountain of the Albula Alps north of Piz Kesch. At the base of the north face lies a glacier named Vadret da Grialetsch. The closest locality is Brail, in the Engadin.
