= Piz Kesch =

Mountain in Switzerland

- Piz d'Es-cha
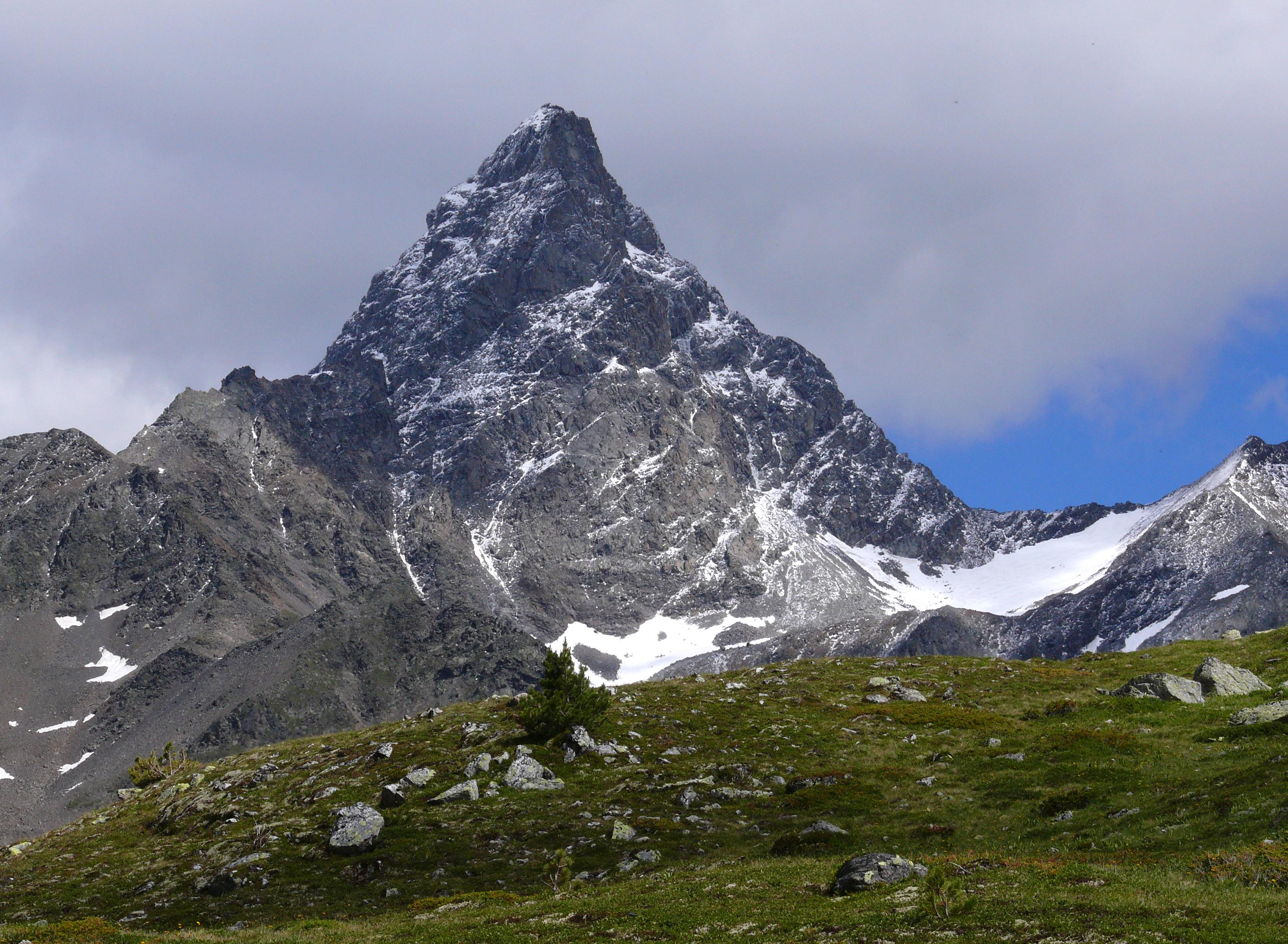
- West view

Highest point
- Elevation: 3,418 m (11,214 ft)
- Prominence: 1,501 m (4,925 ft)
- Parent peak: Galenstock (line parent)
- Isolation: 22.9 km (14.2 mi) to Piz Tschierva
- Listing: Ultra, Alpine mountains above 3000 m
- Coordinates: 46°37′16.7″N 9°52′21.4″E

Geography
- Location within Switzerland
- Location: Graubünden, Switzerland
- Parent range: Albula Alps, Rhaetian Alps

Climbing
- First ascent: 1846 by Johann Coaz, J. Rascher, C. Casper and J. Tscharner

Piz Kesch (German) or Piz d'Es-cha (Rumantsch) is a peak in the Albula Alps of the Rhaetian Alps in Switzerland. At 3,418 metres (11,214 ft), it is the highest peak in the Albula Alps and the municipality of Bergün, Grisons.

The first ascent was made in 1846 by J. Coaz, J. Rascher, C. Casper and J. Tscharner.

== Geography ==
Piz Kesch is part of the mountain ridge which divides the southeastern Swiss Alps between the Rhine drainage basin (North Sea) and the Danube drainage basin (Black Sea). It is also the highest peak in the Eastern Alps north of the Inn River. On the north side lies the Porchabella Glacier.

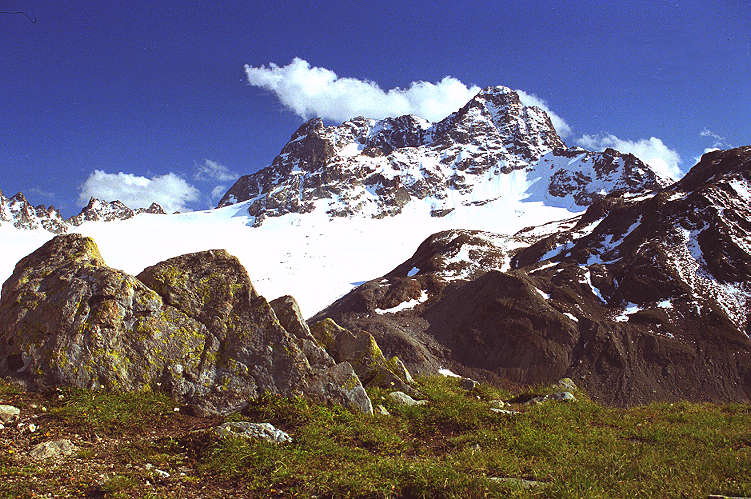
The peak rising above the Porchabella Glacier

West of Piz Kesch lies the Albula Pass (Pass d'Alvra in Rumantsch); to the north lies the valley of Davos, and to the south lies the Upper Engadine. AT the foot of Piz Kesch in the Engadine lies the village of Madulain (1,694 m).

Two SAC alpine huts lie close to Piz Kesch which are the Chamanna d'Es-Cha or Es-Cha Hütte (ca 2,594 m), and the Kesch-Hütte or Chamanna digl Kesch at (ca 2,625 m). The first lies on a 3-hour walk from Madulain, La Punt and Zuoz and about 1½ hours from the Albula Pass road. Kesch-Hütte lies 4½ hours from Bergün and can be reached as well from the Davos southern valleys of Sertig and Dischma or by a longer walk via Val Susauna coming from Cinuos-chel.

== Climbing history ==
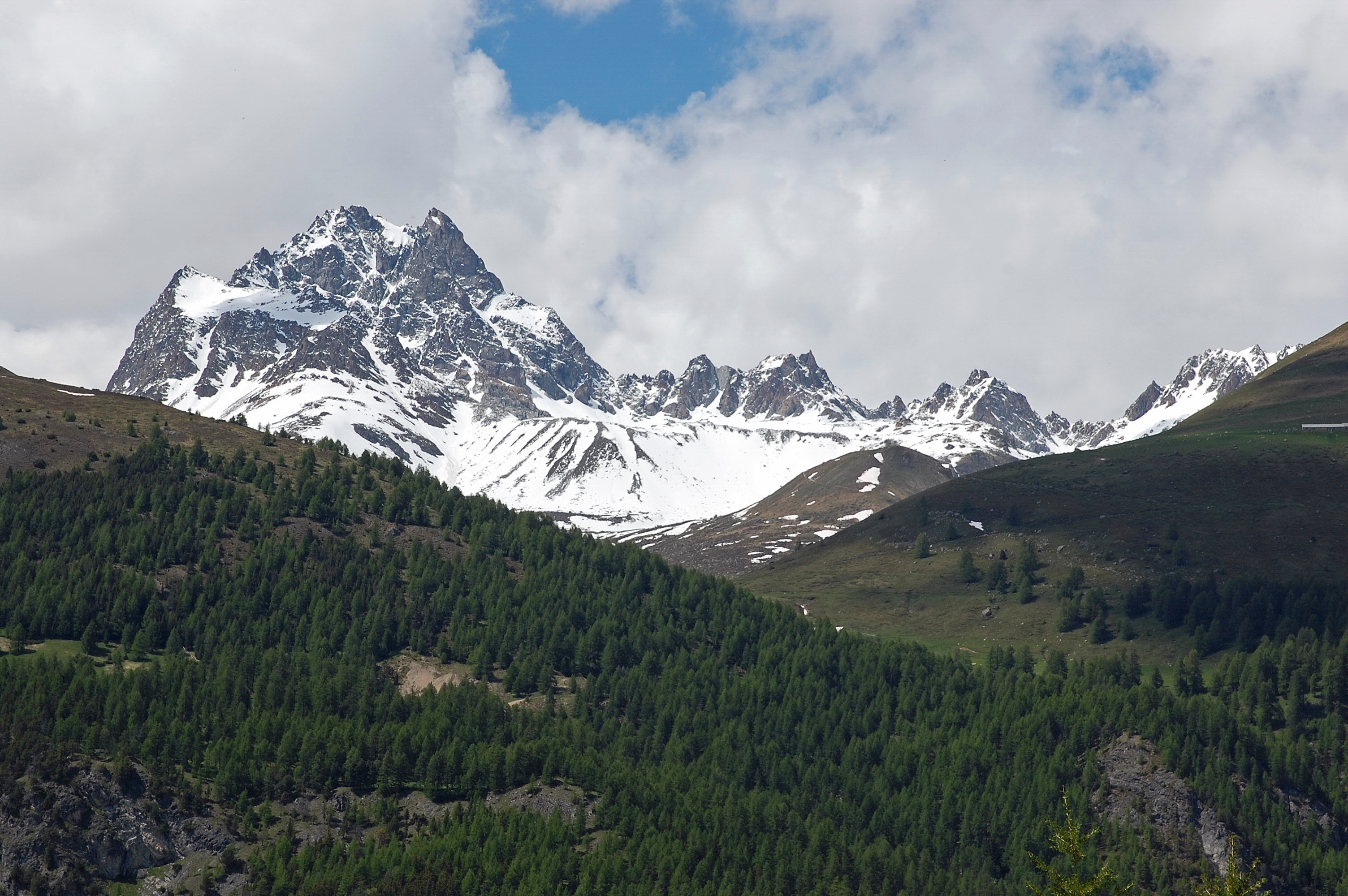
View from the Val d'Es-cha (south-east side)

The tower-like peak of Piz Kesch was reached for the first time on September 7, 1846, by Chr. Casper, Johann Coaz, J. Rascher, J.R. Tscharner. In 1864 the ascent was repeated by Francis Fox Tuckett and Fowler, with guides C. Michel and M. Payot. From the Platzli huts, located above Bergün, they reached in 3 hours a pass (3,008 m) on the ridge above the Vadret da Porchabella, overlooking the head of the Es-cha valley on the east. From this — called Porta d'Es-cha — they finally reached the peak in less than 2 hours. They afterwards descended in 3 hours from the pass to La Punt on the east side of the mountain.

According to Tuckett, they were the first to reach the highest summit:

"...we reached the summit of Piz Kesch without the slightest difficulty in 1 hour 10 m. (45 m. over snow and 25 m. up very steep but good rocks). On a second summit to the SE., which a level showed to be slightly lower than where we stood, was planted a baton; but on our peak were no traces of any previous visit. M. Coaz, I was told, had ascended Piz Kesch a few years ago, so that probably he climbed the second peak by mistake."

== Hiking ==
A network of marked mountain paths leads to the southern, western and northern faces of Piz Kesch whereas the eastern face is covered with a glacier and thus not accessible on hiking trails. The "Kesch-Trek" leads from Dischma via the Scaletta pass towards the southwest and to the Kesch. In the following leg the route passes the western face and reaches Chamanna d'Es-Cha hut via Fuorcla Pischa, already lying in the southern face of Piz Kesch.

== Panorama ==
360° panorama from Piz Kesch

Spherical panorama from Piz Kesch (view as a 360° interactive panorama)

== See also ==
- List of mountains of Switzerland
- List of most isolated mountains of Switzerland
