= Albula Alps =

Swiss mountain range

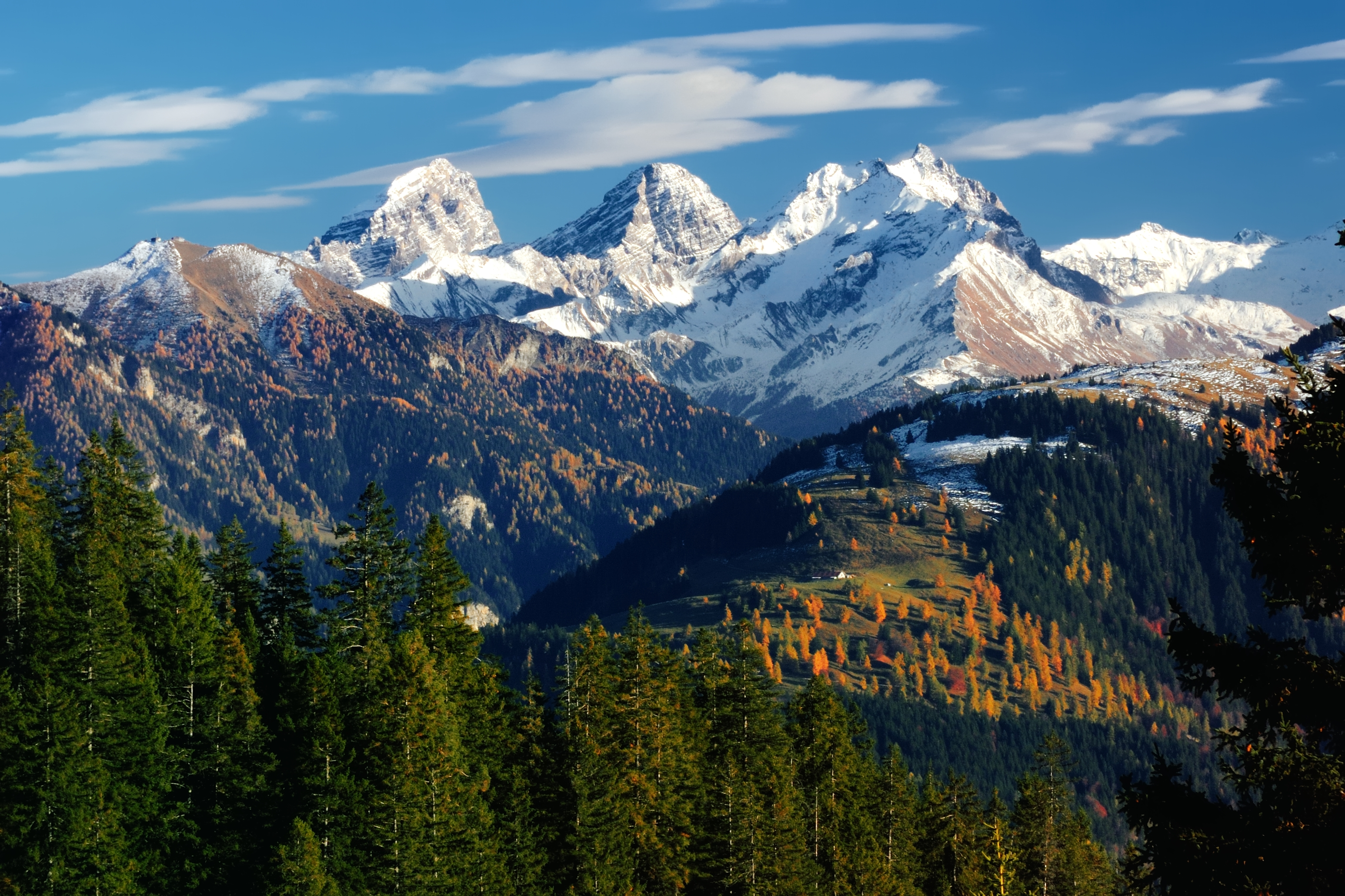
- Bergüner Stöcke (Piz Ela, Corn da Tinizong and Piz Mitgel)

Highest point
- Peak: Piz Kesch
- Elevation: 3,418 m (11,214 ft)
- Coordinates: 46°37′N 09°52′E

Naming
- Native name: Albula-Alpen (German)

Geography
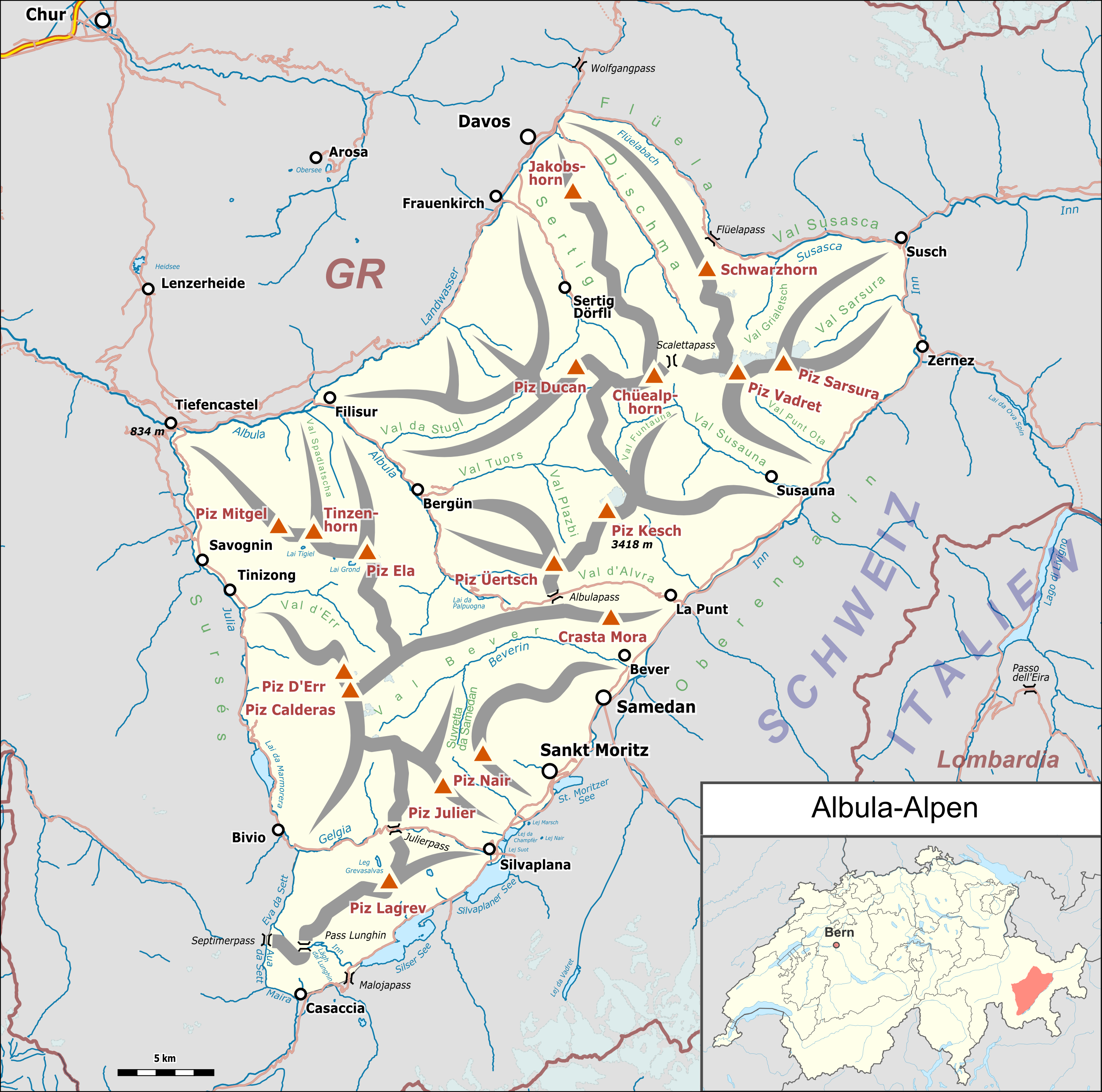
- Albula Alps; The borders of the range according to Alpine Club classification of the Eastern Alps
- Country: Switzerland
- Canton: Graubünden
- Parent range: Western Rhaetian Alps
- Borders on: Oberhalbstein Range; Silvretta Range; Bernina Range
- Topo map: Swiss Federal Office of Topography swisstopo

The Albula Alps are a mountain range in the Alps of eastern Switzerland. They are considered to be part of the Central Eastern Alps, more specifically the Western Rhaetian Alps. They are named after the river Albula. According to AVE (see map), the Albula Alps are separated from the Oberhalbstein Alps in the west by the Septimer Pass and the valley of the Sursés; from the Plessur Alps in the north-west by the Landwasser valley; from the Silvretta group in the north-east by the Flüela Pass; from the Sesvenna Alps in the east by the Inn valley (Engadine); from the Livigno Alps in the south-east by the Inn valley; from the Bernina Range in the south by the Maloja Pass and the Inn valley.

The chief summit of the Albula Alps is Piz Kesch, which is also the highest summit of the Eastern Alps north of the Inn. Other mountains with both a high elevation and a high prominence are Piz Calderas, Piz Ela, Piz Ot and Piz Vadret. The Albula Alps are drained by the rivers Albula, Gelgia, Landwasser and Inn and Mera. Near the Lunghin Pass is the tripoint between the Gelgia, Inn and Mera. This is the tripoint between the basins of the North Sea, Black Sea and Mediterranean Sea.

The main road passes crossing the Albula Alps (from central Graubünden to Engadin) are the Julier Pass and the Albula Pass. On the margin are also the Flüela Pass and the Septimer Pass (bridle path only). The Albula Pass, in the middle of the range, is also an important axis of the Rhaetian Railway, connecting Chur to St. Moritz through the Albula Tunnel. Both pass road and railway traverse the locality of Bergün on the river Albula, the most central town within the Albula Alps.

== Peaks ==
The main peaks of the Albula Alps are:

Peak	Elevation
Piz Kesch	3,418 m (11,214 ft)
Piz Calderas	3,397 m (11,145 ft)
Piz Julier/Gülgia	3,380 m (11,090 ft)
Piz d'Err	3,378 m (11,083 ft)
Piz Ela	3,339 m (10,955 ft)
Piz Üertsch	3,267 m (10,719 ft)
Piz Ot	2,645 m (8,678 ft)
Piz Jenatsch	3,250 m (10,660 ft)
Piz Vadret (S-Chanf)	3,229 m (10,594 ft)
Piz Sarsura	3,178 m (10,427 ft)
Tinzenhorn/Corn da Tinizong	3,173 m (10,410 ft)
Piz Lagrev	3,165 m (10,384 ft)
Piz Mitgel	3,159 m (10,364 ft)
Schwarzhorn (Flüela)	3,146 m (10,322 ft)
Piz Porchabella	3,079 m (10,102 ft)
Hoch Ducan/Piz Ducan	3,063 m (10,049 ft)
Piz Bial	3,061 m (10,043 ft)
Piz Forun	3,052 m (10,013 ft)
Piz Arpschella	3,032 m (9,948 ft)
Piz dal Ras	3,028 m (9,934 ft)
Gletscher Ducan	3,020 m (9,910 ft)
Piz Griatschouls	2,972 m (9,751 ft)
Piz Grevasalvas	2,932 m (9,619 ft)
Piz Neir	2,906 m (9,534 ft)
Piz d'Urezza	2,906 m (9,534 ft)
Chrachenhorn	2,891 m (9,485 ft)
Wuosthorn	2,815 m (9,236 ft)
Piz Lunghin	2,780 m (9,120 ft)

== Passes ==
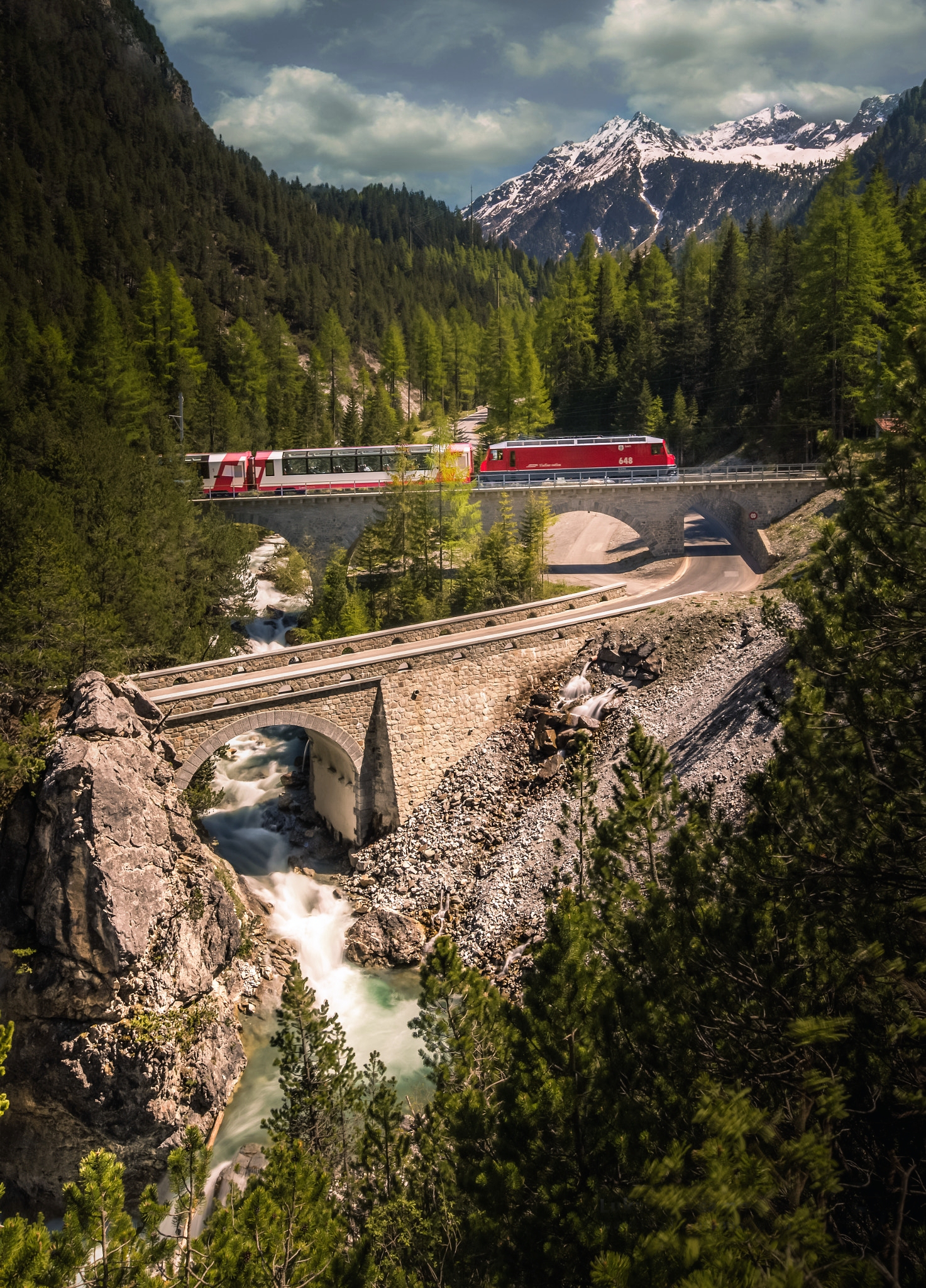
Albula Pass road and Albula Railway crossing the Albula river

The Albula Alps are crossed by one railway tunnel, under the Albula Pass. The main mountain passes of the Albula Alps are:

Mountain pass	location	type	elevation (m/ft)	
Fuorcla Calderas	Mulegns to Bever	snow	3130	10,270
Fuorcla d'Eschia	Madulain to Bergün	snow	3008	9869
Sertig Pass	Davos to S-chanf	footpath	2762	9062
Tinzentor	Bergün to Savognin	footpath	2718	8918
Ducan Pass	Davos to Bergün	footpath	2671	8763
Forcella di Lunghino	Maloja to the Septimer Pass	footpath	2635	8645
Scaletta Pass	Davos to S-chanf	bridle path	2619	8593
Suvretta Pass	St. Moritz to Val Bever	bridle path	2618	8590
Fuorcla d'Alp Fontauna	Bergün to S-chanf	footpath	2615	8580
Grialetsch Pass	Davos to Susch	footpath	2546	8353
Flüela Pass	Davos to Susch	road	2389	7838
Albula Pass	Bergün to La Punt Chamues-ch	road	2315	7595
Septimer Pass	Bivio to Val Bregaglia	bridle path	2311	7582
Julier Pass	Thusis to Silvaplana	road	2287	7504
Maloja Pass	St. Moritz to Chiavenna	road	1815	5955

== See also ==
- Swiss Alps
- List of mountains in Switzerland
