= Dischma =

Coordinates: 46°46′33″N 9°52′12″E

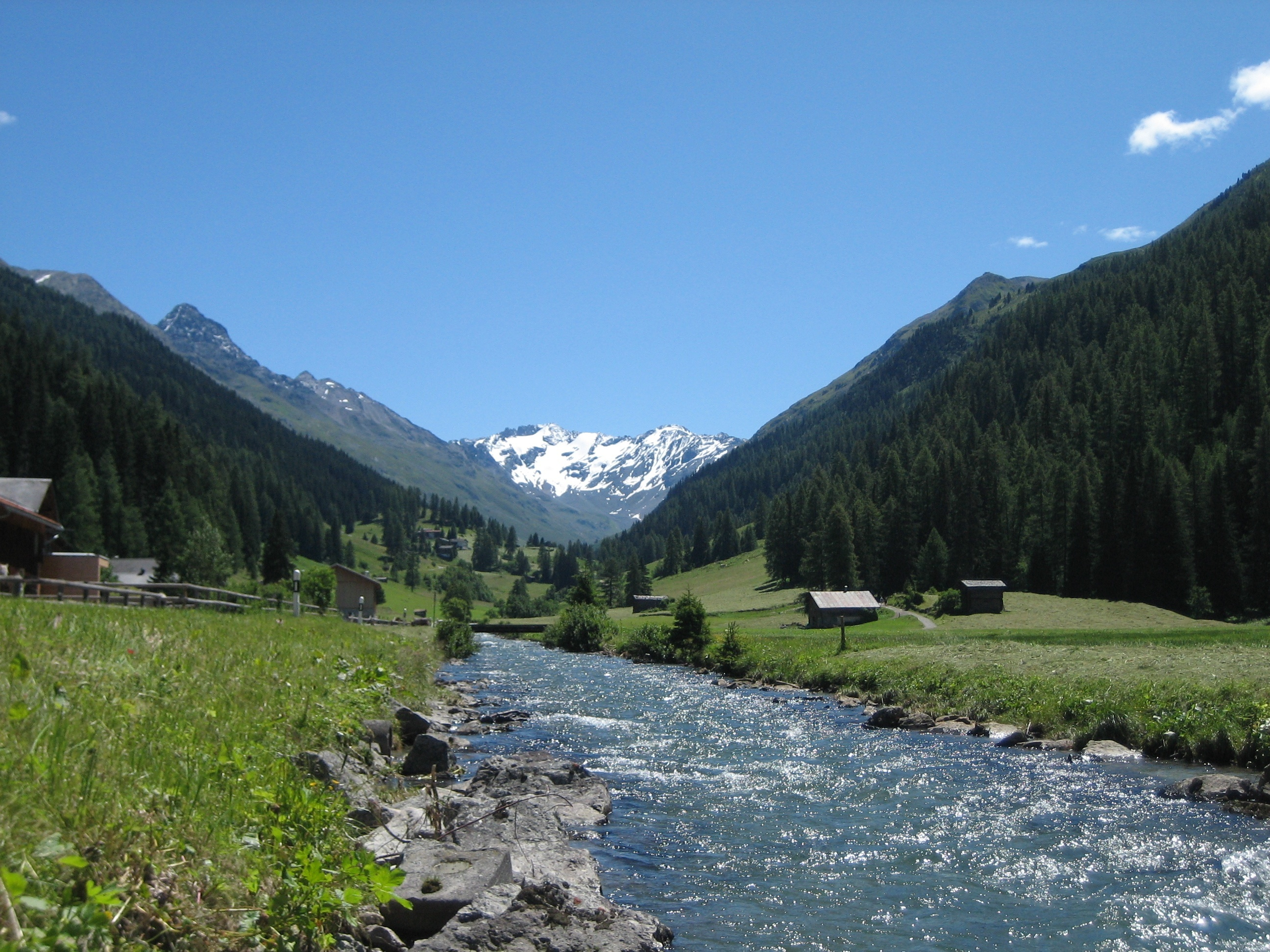
View of the Dischma at Uf den Chaiseren

The Dischma is a valley on the territory of the Swiss municipality of Davos. The name is derived from the Latin: decimus ("Tenth"). It is documented as decimata in the 12th century.

== Location ==
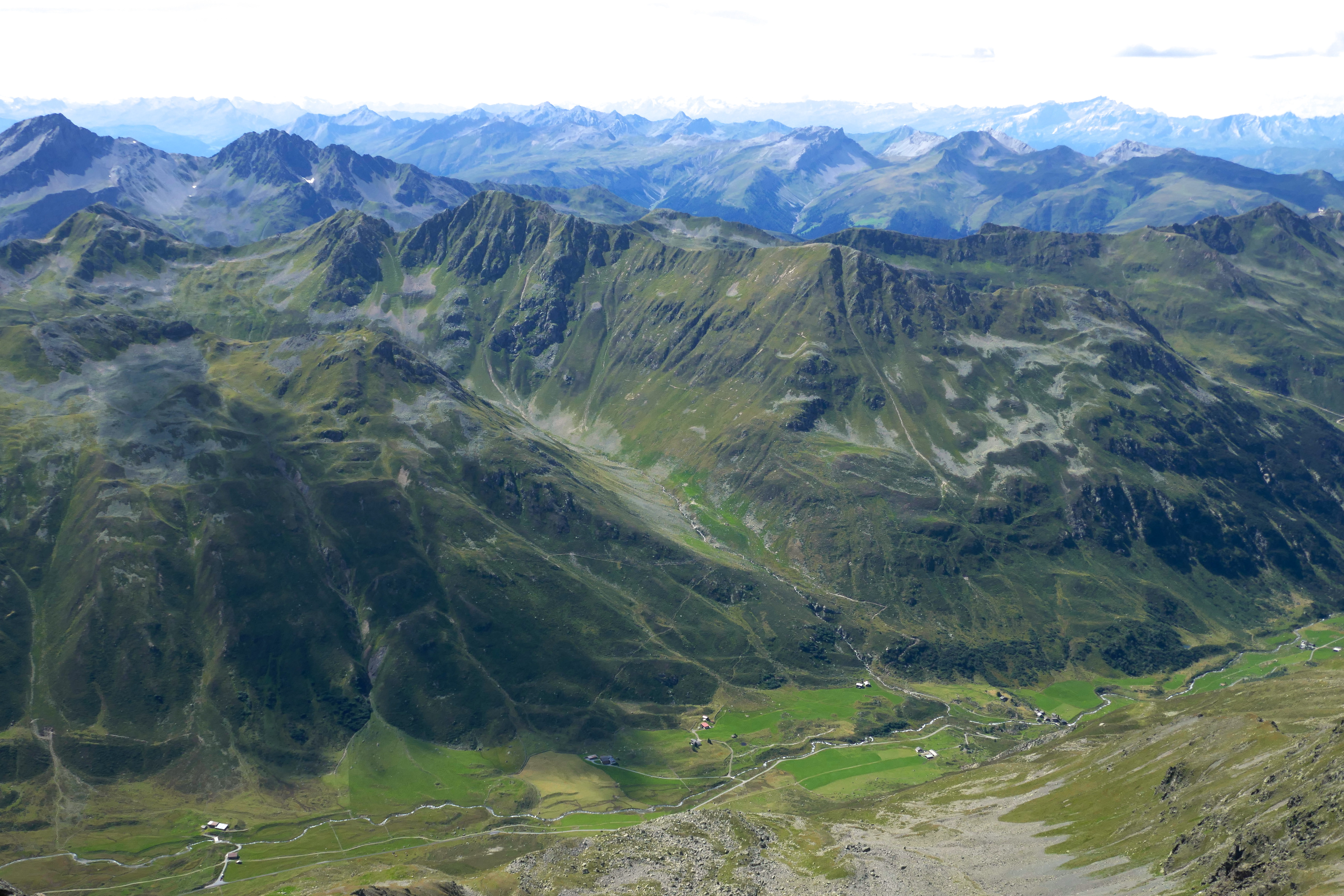
Dischma and Rüedisch Tälli

Dischma is the middle of the three long, gently sloping, parallel alpine valleys stretching southeast from the Davos plateau toward the Engadin. Its north-eastern neighbour is the Flüela; its southwestern neighbour is the Sertig valley. The Dischma valley is drained by the Dischmabach. The valley floor is at an altitude of about 1500–2000 meters. The most important side valleys are the Rüedisch Tälli and Rinertälli.

== Settlements ==
In the valley, there are several small settlements and alpine pastures. Among the most important are, in order from the bottom to the top of the valley: In den Büelen, Wildi (1,577 m above the sea), Uf den Chaiseren (1,590 m above the sea), In den Stücken (1,616 m above the sea), Stillberg (1,974 m above the sea), Hof (1,664 m above the sea), Teufi (1,700 m above the sea), Boden (1,704 m above the sea), Gadmen (1,819 m above the sea), Am Rin (1,846 m above the sea), Grossalp (1,953 m above the sea) and Dürrboden (2,007 m above the sea).

These settlements form the Dischma neighborhood of the sub-municipality of Davos Platz.

== Passes and glaciers ==
At the end of the valley are the two passes leading into the Engadin: the Scaletta Pass (Romansh: Cuolm S-chaletta) and Fuorcla Grialetsch with the SAC's Grialetschhütte. This pass was important in the Late Middle Ages and the Early Modern Period for the import of wine from the Valtellina valley to Davos. At the top of the valley, we find the Scaletta Glacier between Piz Grialetsch (3,131 m above the sea) and Scalettahorn (3,068 m above the sea).

== Surrounding mountains ==
Important mountains on the Flüela side are Schwarzhorn (3,146 m above the sea), Piz Radönt (3,065 m above the sea), Sentischhorn (2,827 m above the sea) and Baslersch Chopf (2,629 m above the sea). Mountains on the Sertig side include Bocktenhorn (3,044 m above the sea), Jatzhorn (2,682 m above the sea) and the Jakobshorn (2,590 m above the sea), which is surrounded by ski lifts.

The Dischma and Sertig valleys are also starting points for a multi-day hike to the Piz Kesch, which is an ultra prominent peak, that is, a peak with a topographic prominence of over 1500 meters. The hike trail leads from the Dischma valley to the Keschhütte and around the mountain.

== Public transport ==
Bus 13 of the Davos municipal transport company runs a regular service from Davos to Dürrboden.
