= Piz Radönt =

Mountain in Switzerland

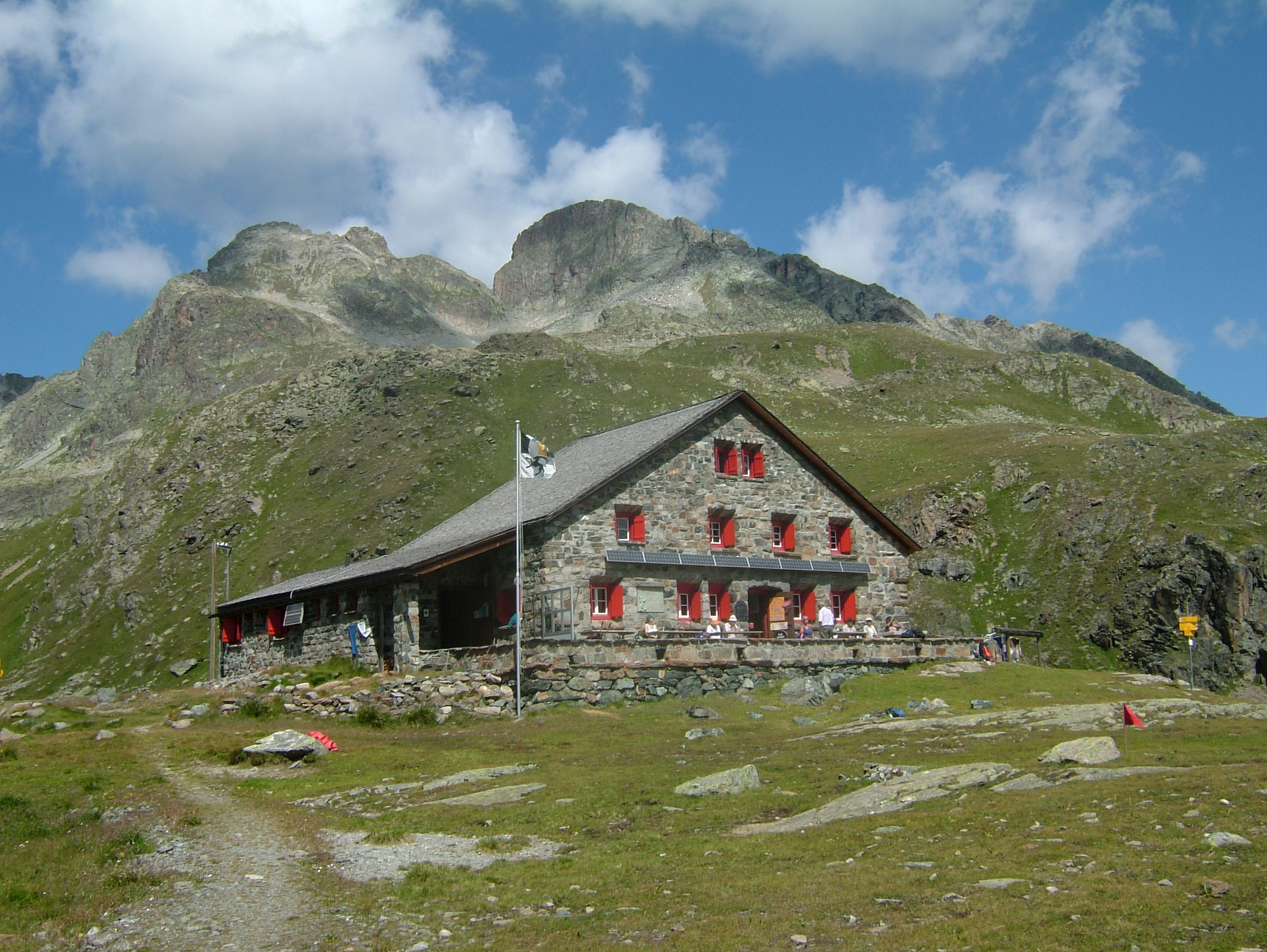
- Piz Radönt (centre) from the Grialetsch hut

Highest point
- Elevation: 3,065 m (10,056 ft)
- Prominence: 185 m (607 ft)
- Parent peak: Flüela Schwarzhorn
- Coordinates: 46°43′21″N 9°57′29″E

Geography
- Location within Switzerland
- Location: Graubünden, Switzerland
- Parent range: Albula Alps

Piz Radönt is a mountain of the Albula Alps, overlooking the Fuorcla da Grialetsch in the Swiss canton of Graubünden. It lies south of the Flüela Schwarzhorn, on the range between the Dischma valley and the Flüela Pass.
