= Sentischhorn =

Mountain in Switzerland

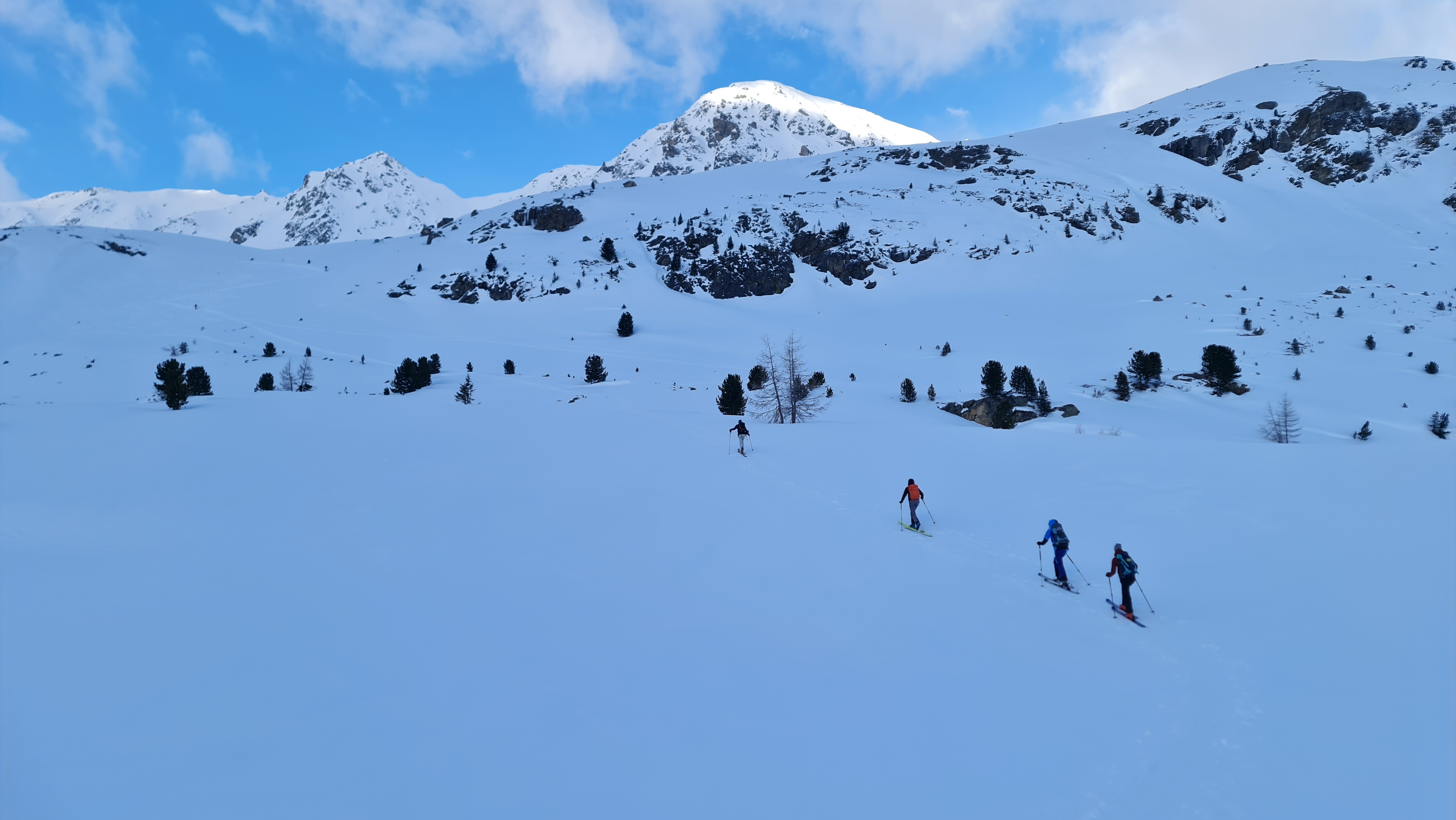

Highest point
- Elevation: 2,827 m (9,275 ft)
- Prominence: 162 m (531 ft)
- Parent peak: Flüela Schwarzhorn
- Coordinates: 46°45′57″N 9°54′55″E

Geography
- Location within Switzerland
- Location: Graubünden, Switzerland
- Parent range: Albula Alps

The Sentischhorn (also spelled Sentisch Horn) (2,827 m) is a mountain of the Albula Alps, located east of Davos in the canton of Graubünden. It lies on the range west of the Flüela Pass, that culminates at the Flüela Schwarzhorn.
