= Pischahorn =

Mountain in Switzerland

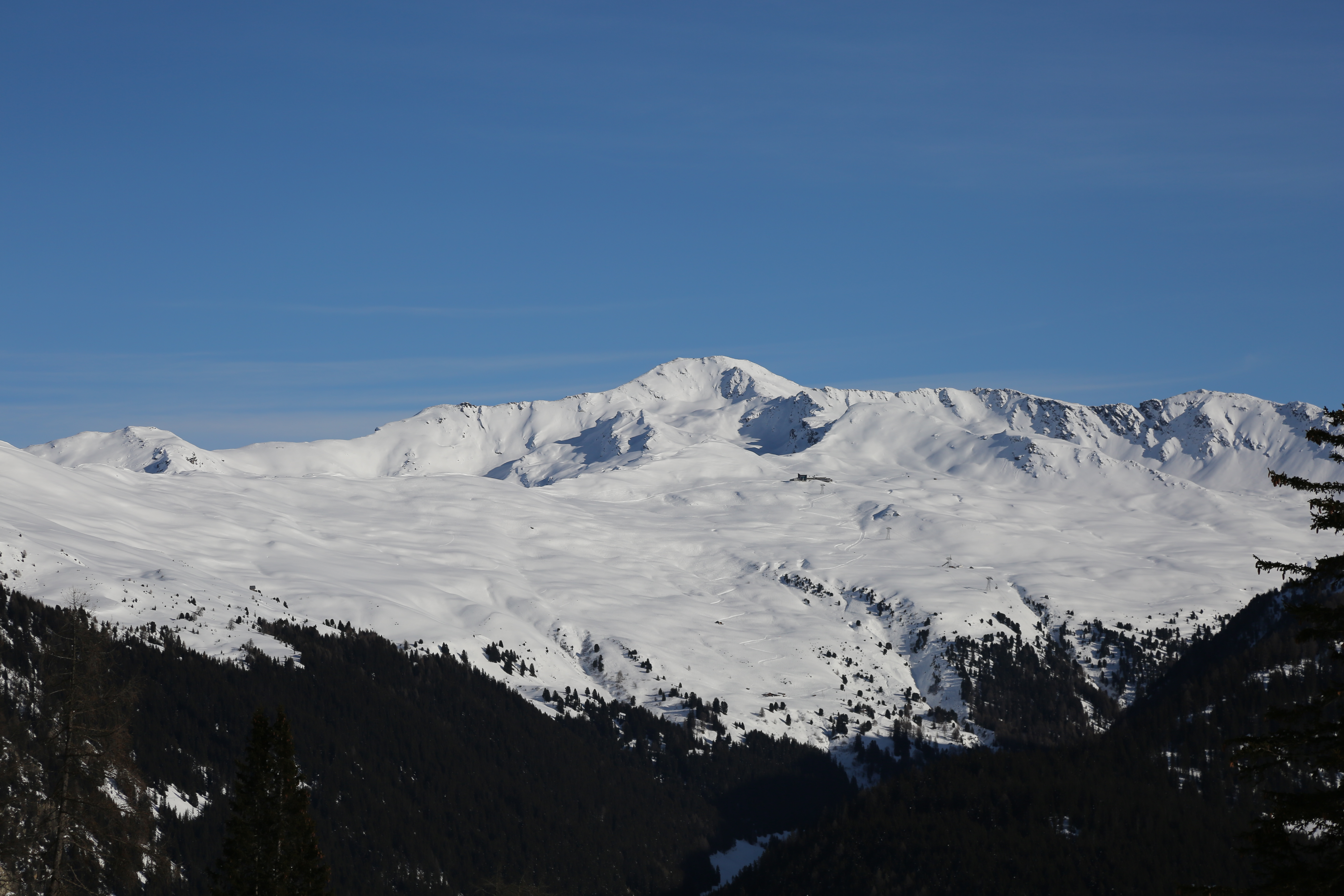

Highest point
- Elevation: 2,980 m (9,780 ft)
- Prominence: 214 m (702 ft)
- Parent peak: Gorihorn
- Coordinates: 46°48′50.5″N 9°56′50.6″E

Geography
- Location within Switzerland
- Location: Graubünden, Switzerland
- Parent range: Silvretta Alps

The Pischahorn is a mountain of the Silvretta Alps, located east of Davos, in the Swiss canton of Graubünden. Several trails lead to its summit.
