= List of Landammann of Davos =

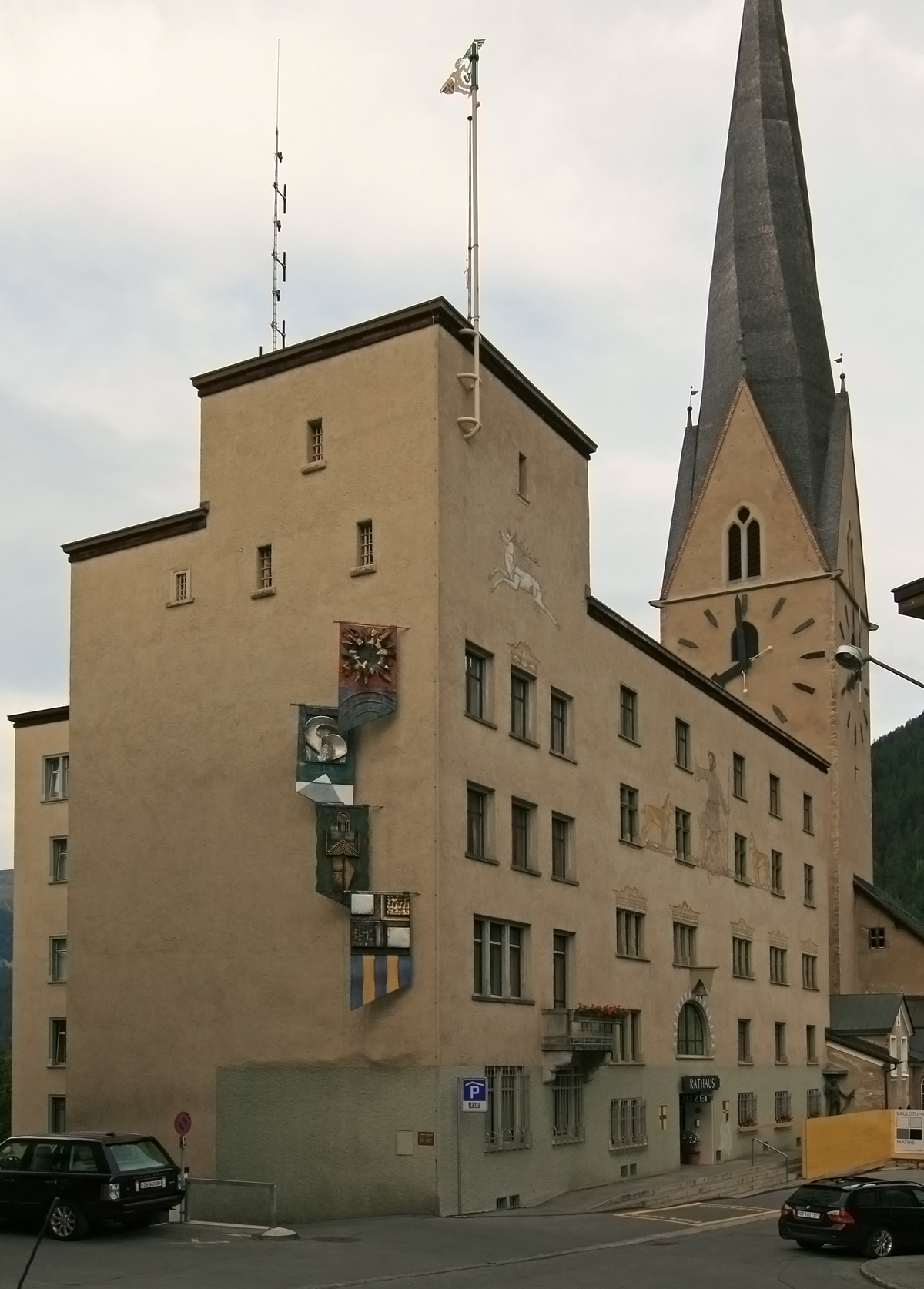
Rathaus Davos

Coat of arms of Davos

This is a list of Landammann of Davos, Switzerland. The Landammann chairs the executive council (Kleiner Landrat) of Davos.

Landammann of Davos
Term	Mayor	Lifespan	Party	Notes
1901–1908	Andreas Laely	(1864–1955)		
1909–1913	Gaudenz Issler	(1853–1942)		
1913–1920	Joos Wolf	(1859–1927)		
1920–1936	Erhard Branger	(1881–1958)		
1956–1980	Christian Jost	(1925–2007)	FDP/PRD	
1980–1992	Luzius Schmid			
-2001	Erwin Roffler	(born 1948)	FDP/PRD	
2005–2012	Hans-Peter Michel	(born 1954)	FDP/PRD	
2013–2020	Tarzisius Caviezel	(born 1954)	FDP/PRD	
2021-present	Philipp Wilhelm	(born 1988)	SP	
