= Piz Grialetsch =

Mountain in Switzerland

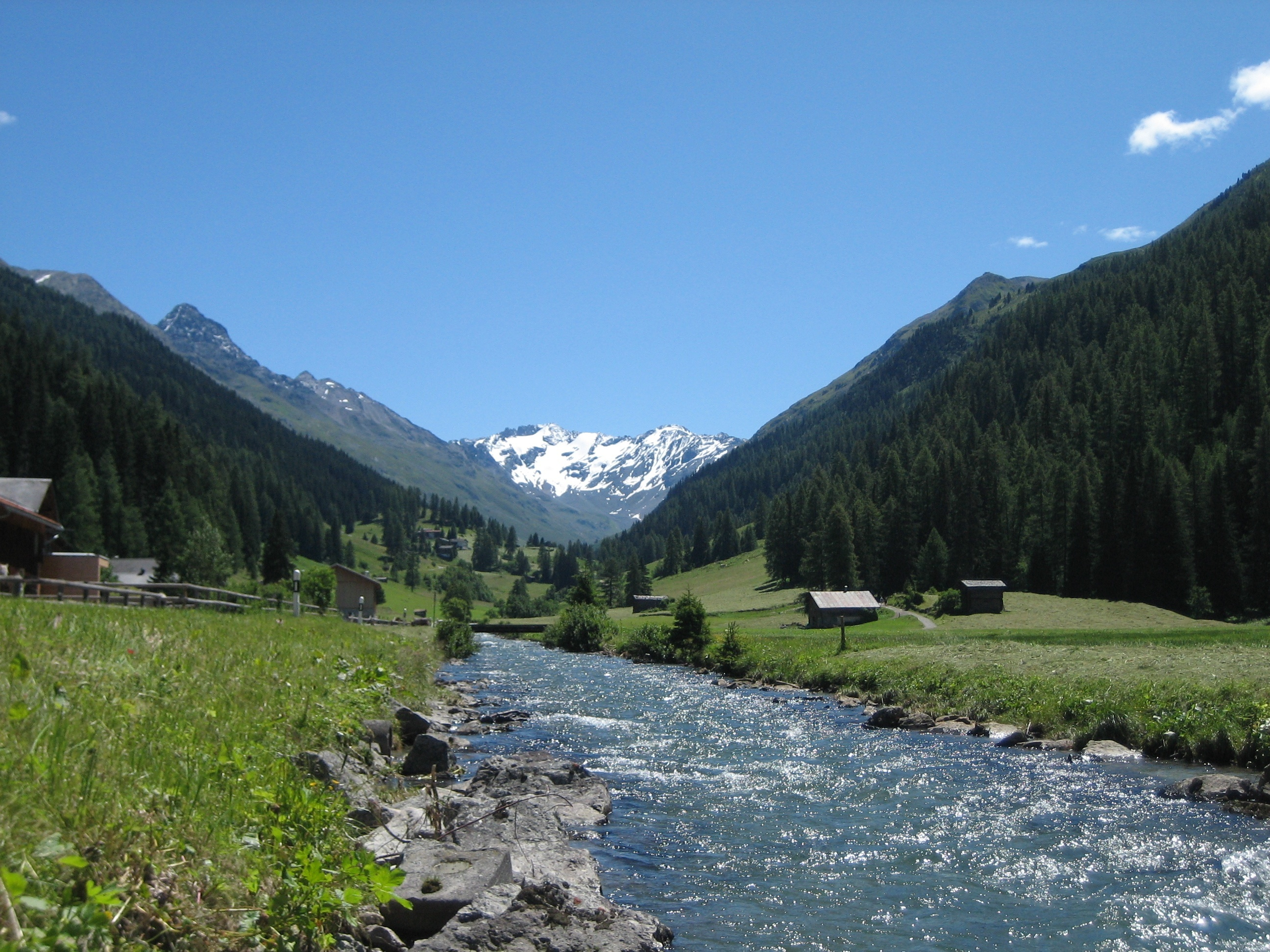
- Piz Grialetsch (background centre) from the Dischma valley

Highest point
- Elevation: 3,131 m (10,272 ft)
- Prominence: 164 m (538 ft)
- Parent peak: Piz Vadret
- Coordinates: 46°41′37″N 9°57′17″E

Geography
- Location within Switzerland
- Location: Graubünden, Switzerland
- Parent range: Albula Alps

Piz Grialetsch is a mountain of the Albula Alps, Switzerland, overlooking the Fuorcla da Grialetsch in the canton of Graubünden. It lies on the range between the Dischma and Engadin valleys, which culminates at Piz Vadret.
