= Schwarzsee (Davos) =

Lake in the Grisons, Switzerland

- Location within Canton of Graubünden Location within Switzerland Location within Italy Location within Alps
- Interactive map of Schwarzsee
- Location: Laret, Davos, Grisons
- Coordinates: 46.8454°N 9.87°E
- Basin countries: Switzerland
- Surface elevation: 1,504 m (4,934 ft)

Schwarzsee is a lake at Laret, between Davos and Klosters in the Grisons, Switzerland. It is located at an elevation of 1,504 m.
