= Gorihorn =

Mountain in Switzerland

- Isentällispitz
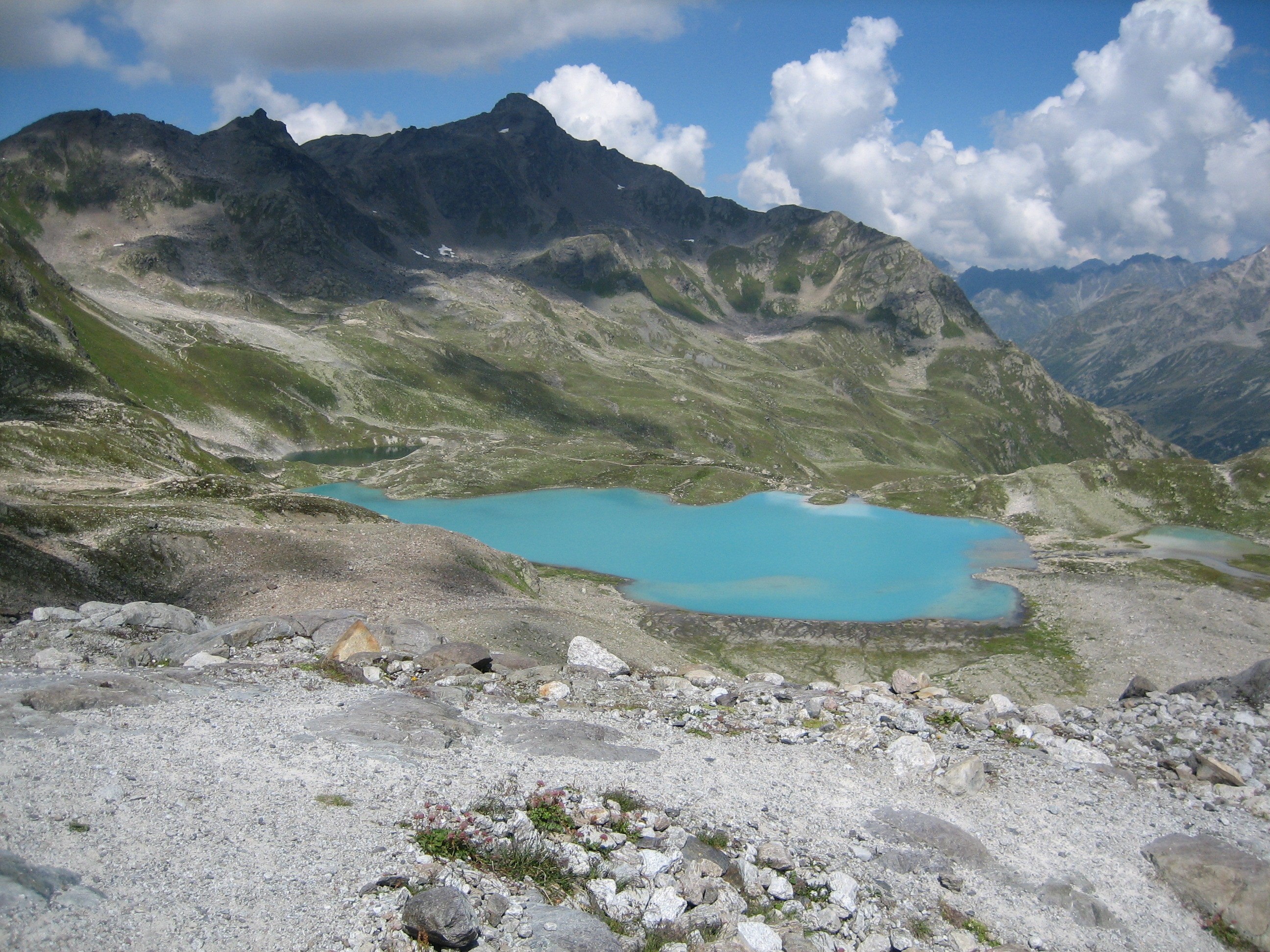
- Jöriseen, Jörihorn and Gorihorn.

Highest point
- Elevation: 2,986 m (9,797 ft)
- Prominence: 263 m (863 ft)
- Parent peak: Flüela Wisshorn
- Coordinates: 46°47′43″N 9°57′32″E

Geography
- Location within Switzerland
- Location: Graubünden, Switzerland
- Parent range: Silvretta Alps

The Gorihorn (also known as Isentällispitz) is a mountain of the Silvretta Alps, located north of the Flüela Pass in the Swiss canton of Graubünden.
