= Davos =

Municipality in the Grisons, Switzerland

- Municipality
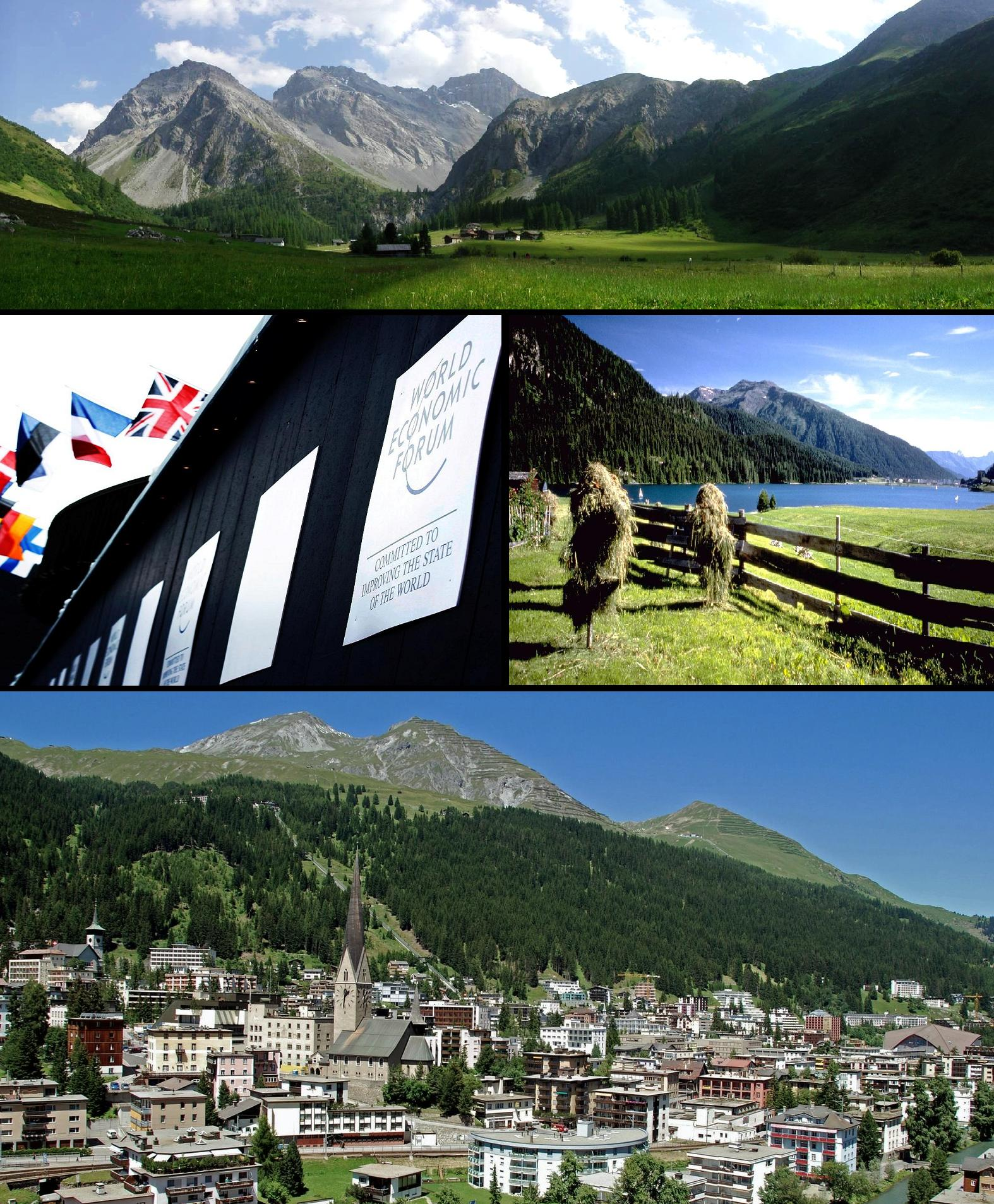
- Top: View of the Sertig Valley, Middle left: World Economic Forum congress centre, Middle right: Lake Davos, Bottom: View over Davos

- Flag Coat of arms
- Location of Davos
- Location within Switzerland Location within Canton of Grisons
- Coordinates: 46°48′N 9°50′E
- Country: Switzerland
- Canton: Grisons
- District: Prättigau/Davos

Government
  - Executive: Kleiner Landrat with 5 members
  - Mayor: Landammann (list); Philipp Wilhelm SPS/PSS (as of January 2021)
  - Parliament: Grosser Landrat with 17 members

Area
  - Total: 283.99 km^{2} (109.65 sq mi)
- Elevation (Church St. Theodul): 1,560 m (5,120 ft)
- Highest elevation (Schwarzhorn (Flüela)): 3,146 m (10,322 ft)
- Lowest elevation (Landwasser (river) near Leidboda): 1,052 m (3,451 ft)

Population (December 2020)
  - Total: 10,832
  - Density: 38.142/km^{2} (98.788/sq mi)
- Demonym: German: Davoser/Davoserin
- Time zone: UTC+01:00 (CET)
  - Summer (DST): UTC+02:00 (CEST)
- Postal codes: 7260 Davos Dorf, 7265 Davos Wolfgang, 7270 Davos Platz, 7272 Davos Clavadel, 7276 Davos Frauenkirch, 7277 Davos Glaris, 7278 Davos Monstein, 7294 Davos Wiesen
- SFOS number: 3851
- ISO 3166 code: CH-GR
- Localities: Davos Dorf, Davos Platz, Frauenkirch, Davos Glaris, Davos Wiesen, Davos Monstein, Davos Clavadel, Laret, Wolfgang, Obem See, Meierhof, Stilli, Bünda, Spina, Tschuggen, Dörfji, In den Büelen, Hof, Teufi, Gadmen, Am Rin, Dürrboden, Sertig Dörfli, Oberalp, Inneralp
- Surrounded by: Arosa, Bergün/Bravuogn, Klosters-Serneus, Langwies, S-chanf, Susch
- Website: www.gemeindedavos.ch

Davos (UK: /ˈdævɒs, dɑːˈvɒs/, US: /dɑːˈvoʊs/; German: [daˈfoːs] or [daˈvoːs]; Romansh: Tavau; Old Italian: Tavate) is an Alpine resort town and municipality in the Prättigau/Davos Region in the canton of the Grisons, Switzerland. It has a permanent population of 10,832 (2020). Davos is located on the Landwasser river, in the Rhaetian Alps, between the Plessur and Albula Ranges.

The municipality covers nearly the entire valley of the Landwasser, and the centre of population, economic activity and administration is two adjacent villages, Davos Dorf (engl.: Davos Village) and Davos Platz (Davos Place), which are 1,560 m (5,120 ft) above sea level.

Davos gained prominence in the 19th century as a mountain health resort. Since 1971, it has hosted the World Economic Forum, an annual meeting of global political and corporate leaders. With its long history of winter sports, Davos also has one of Switzerland's largest ski resorts and hosts the international Spengler Cup, an ice hockey tournament, every December.

== Name ==
The name is first recorded in the 13th century as Tavaus. It may derive from Vulgar Latin *Tovani (accusative *Tovanes), meaning "people of the ravine", or else from an adjective *tovatum (accusative plural *tovatos), meaning "(areas) covered by ravine debris". In both cases, the root word would be *tovum, "ravine", a vulgar reflex of tubus. The reference would be either to the Schiatobel or to the Albertitobel, two ravines overlooking the town.

== History ==
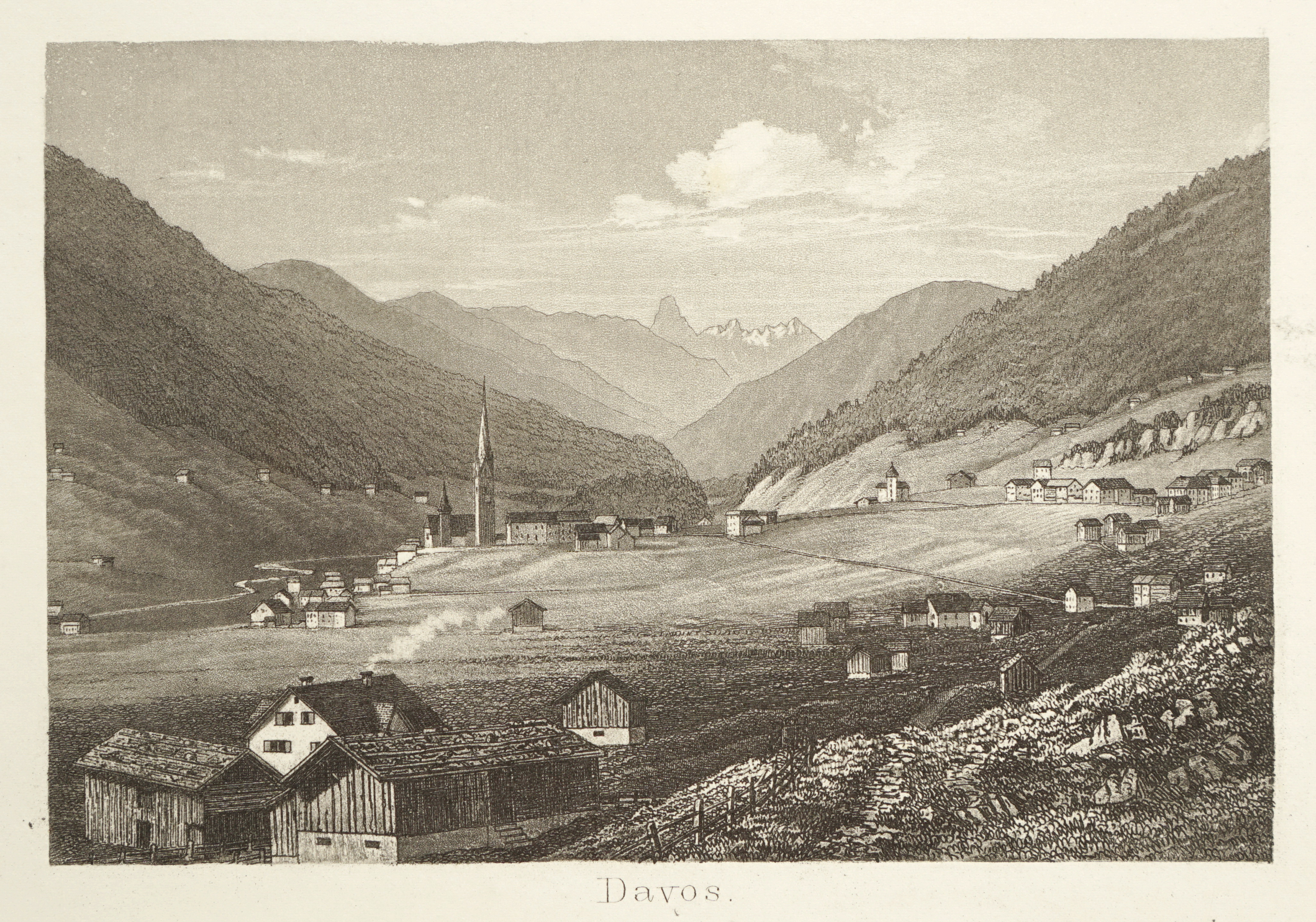
Davos c. 1870. Etching by Heinrich Müller

Aerial view from 300 m by Walter Mittelholzer (1923)

The current settlement of the Davos area began in the High Middle Ages with the immigration of Rhaeto-Romans. The village of Davos is first mentioned in 1213 as Tavaus. From about 1280 the barons of Vaz allowed German-speaking Walser colonists to settle and conceded them extensive self-administration rights. In 1289 an agreement between the people of Davos and the baron of Vaz included that the Davoser citizens would not have to pay personal taxes, only the Government of Davos had to pay a yearly amount of goods to the baron of Vaz. Davos became the largest Walser settlement area in eastern Switzerland. Natives still speak a dialect that is atypical for Grisons, showing similarities with the German spoken in Raron in Canton Valais. In 1338, with the death of the last Baron of Vaz, Davos came into possession of Frederick V, the Count of Toggenburg, who was the brother of the wife of the deceased baron. Davos retained its right to elect its Landamman independently.

In 1436, the League of the Ten Jurisdictions was founded in Davos. In 1438, Davos received additional rights in an agreement in which the League of the Ten Jurisdictions and the rights received in the older treaty from 1289 were both acknowledged. With this agreement, Davos was exempted from trade taxes in the territory of the Ten Jurisdictions and only obliged to provide men for military services within the territory of eight of the Ten Jurisdictions. In 1443 Davos came under the control of the Counts of Montfort, under which Davos also retained its rights. In 1450 an alliance between the League of the Ten Jurisdictions and the League of God's House was signed. The Counts of Montfort reached a financial impasse and sold Davos to Duke Sigmund of Tyrol in 1466. This lead Davos to search for support of the two other Raethian leagues and a treaty with the Grey League was reached in 1471. As a result, Davos refused to follow the orders of the Austrian Empire. Eventually a compromise was found, under which Davos would come under the control of the House of Matsch, but Austria kept a right to repurchase Davos.

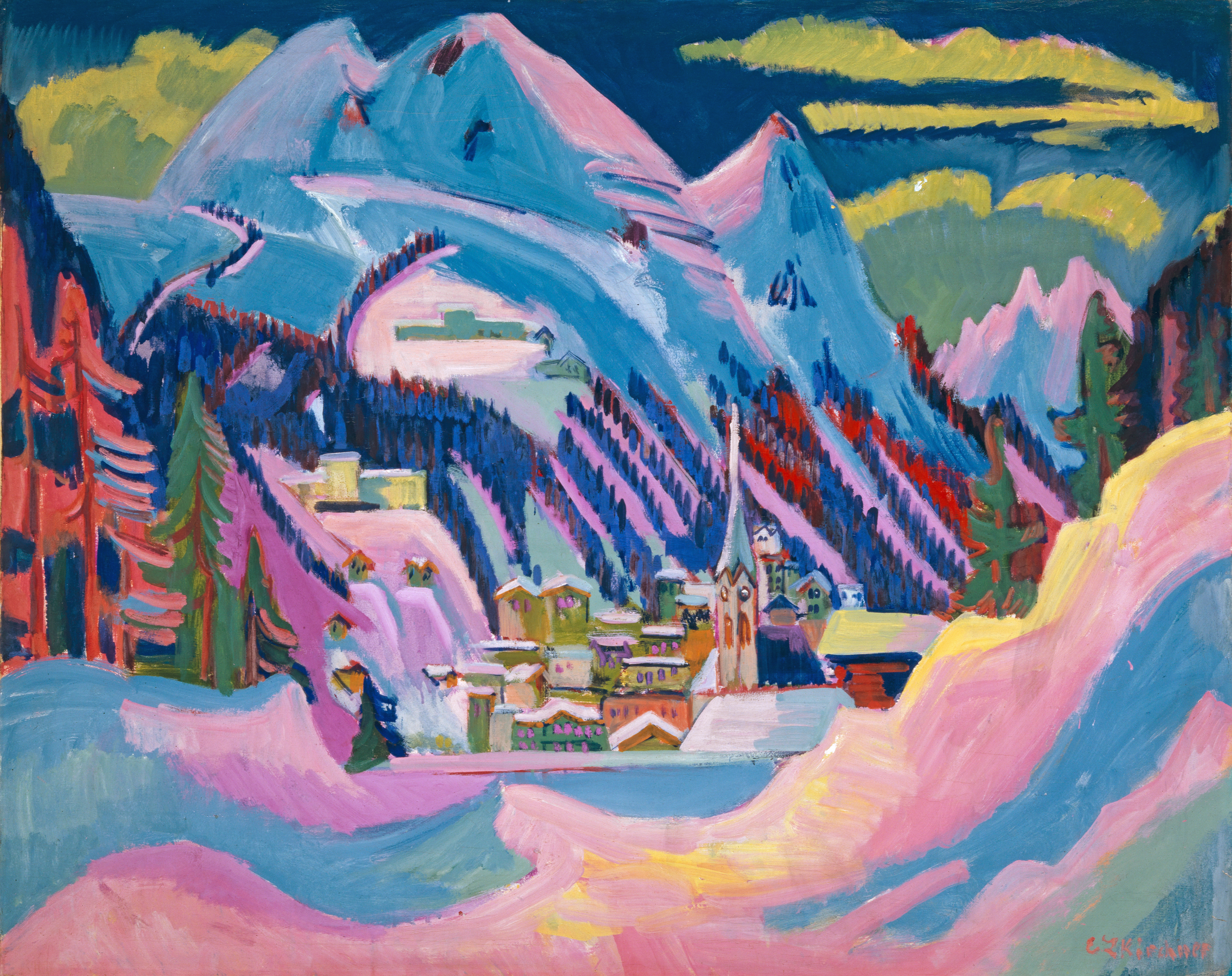
Ernst Ludwig Kirchner: Davos in Winter, 1923 (Kunstmuseum Basel)

From the middle of the 19th century, Davos, modeled on Görbersdorf (now Sokołowsko), became a popular destination for the sick and ailing because the microclimate in the high valley was deemed excellent by doctors (initiated by Alexander Spengler) and recommended for lung disease patients. Robert Louis Stevenson, who suffered from tuberculosis, wintered in Davos in 1880 on the recommendation of his Edinburgh physician George Balfour. Arthur Conan Doyle wrote an article about skiing in Davos in 1899. A sanatorium in Davos is also the inspiration for the Berghof Sanitorium in Thomas Mann's novel Der Zauberberg (The Magic Mountain). Between 1936 and 1938, Ernst Ludwig Kirchner, then at the end of his life and living in Davos since 1917, depicted Davos and the Junkerboden. His painting has a both Romantic and pantheistic atmosphere and simplified formal structure.

The several sanatoria in Davos attracted a great number of German patients, of which many remained in Davos. As a result, during World War II, in which Switzerland remained neutral, Davos was a centre of Nazi activity in Switzerland. Nowhere else in the country were there more NSDAP members as a share of the population. In the many German-led sanatoria and schools, Nazi salutes and flags were de rigueur. Swiss Nazi leader Wilhelm Gustloff's 1936 assassination in Davos led to tensions with Nazi Germany. At the end of the war, Federal Councillor Ernst Nobs described Davos as "more Nazi-infested than any other Swiss place". In 2022, Davos mayor Philip Willhelm commissioned a study from historian Stefan Keller documenting the history of Nazi influence in Davos.

During the natural ice era of winter sports, Davos and the Davos Eisstadion were a mecca for speed skating. Many international championships were held here, and many world records were set, beginning with the Norwegian Peder Østlund who set two world records in 1898, and four in 1900. The only European Bandy Championship was held in the town in 1913. Subsequently, Davos became a ski resort, especially frequented by tourists from the United Kingdom and the Netherlands. After peaking in the 1970s and 1980s, the city settled down as a leading but less high-profile tourist attraction. The American Van Leer family immigrated from here with their former Valär surname. Today Valärs still live and are members of government.

== Geography ==
=== Topography ===
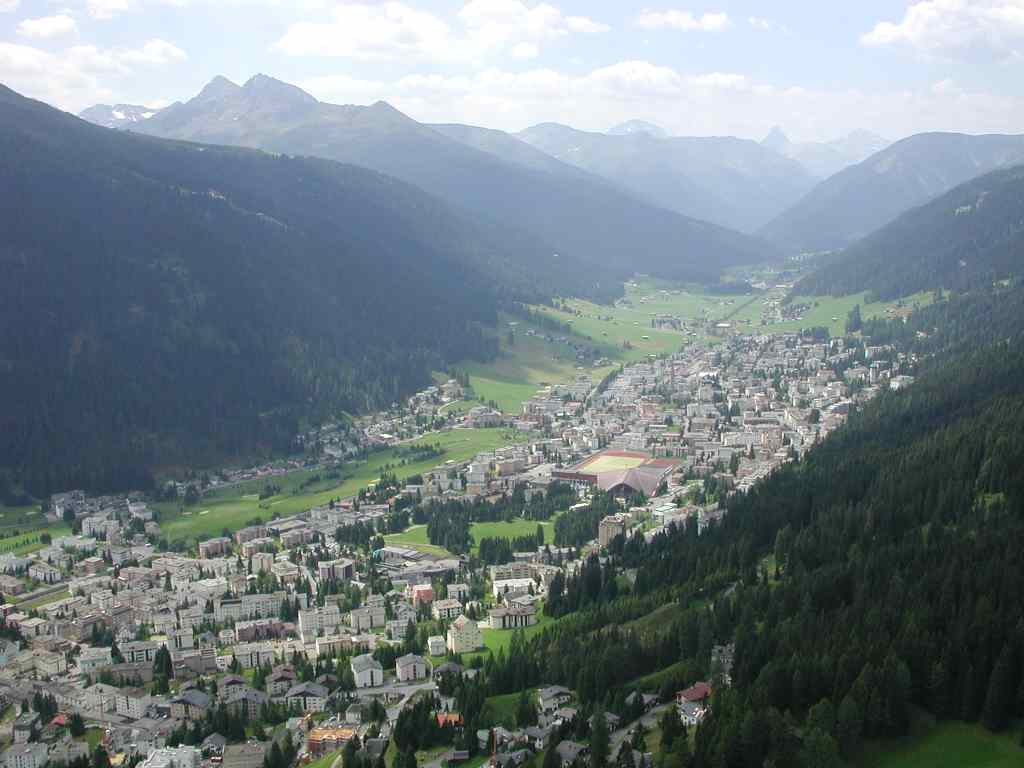
View of Davos from a paraglider, looking southwest

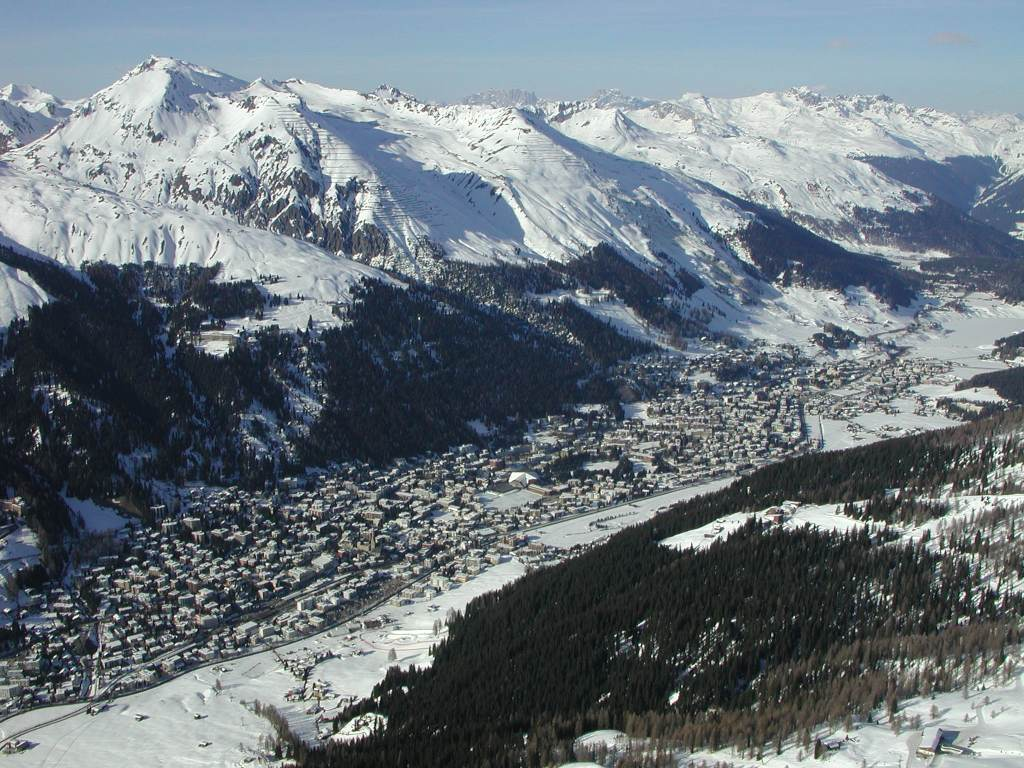
Davos from the air, looking north, with Schatzalp and Parsenn ski areas

The main village of Davos lies at the top of the narrow valley of the Landwasser at an altitude of 1,560 metres (5,120 ft), just below the Wolfgang Pass. Lake Davos is northeast of the village, formerly the source of the Landwasser.

The municipality of Davos (German: Gemeinde Davos) has an area (as of the 2004/09 survey) of 284 km^{2} (109.65 sq mi), including most of the Landwasser valley and its side valleys.

Of that area, about 35.0% is used for agricultural purposes, and 22.2% is forested. Of the rest of the land, 2.3% is settled (buildings or roads) and 40.5% is unproductive land. In the 2004/09 survey a total of 337 ha (830 acres) or about 1.2% of the total area was covered with buildings, an increase of 61 ha (150 acres) over the 1985 amount. Over the same time period, the amount of recreational space in the municipality increased by 10 ha (25 acres) and is now about 0.22% of the total area. Of the agricultural land, 1,296 ha (3,200 acres) is fields and grasslands and 9,056 ha (22,380 acres) consists of alpine grazing areas. Since 1985 the amount of agricultural land has decreased by 736 ha (1,820 acres). Over the same time period the amount of forested land has increased by 481 ha (1,190 acres). Rivers and lakes cover 285 ha (700 acres) in the municipality.

The Wolfgang Pass divides the waters flowing into the Landquart from the valley of the Landwasser, and has a year-round road and Rhaetian Railway connection. Crossing the pass leads to the village of Klosters and the Prättigau. Three long side valleys reach out to the south from the main valley of the Landwasser, one of which leads to the Flüela Pass and the Engadin beyond.

=== Political divisions ===
The whole municipality of Davos is divided into six Fraktionsgemeinden: Davos Dorf, Davos Platz, Davos Frauenkirch, Davos Glaris, Davos Monstein and Davos Wiesen. The names of the Fraktionsgemeinden correspond to their largest village within.

Smaller populated places in the municipality are the village of Davos Clavadel, the hamlets of Laret, Wolfgang, Obem See, Meierhof, Stilli, Bünda, and Spina (in the main Landwasser valley), and Tschuggen, Dörfji, In den Büelen, Hof, Teufi, Gadmen, Am Rin, Dürrboden, Sertig Dörfli, Oberalp, Inneralp (in the side valleys).

Until 2017, the municipality was located in the Davos subdistrict of the Prättigau/Davos district. Since 2017, it is part of the Prättigau/Davos Region. In terms of area, it was the largest municipality in Switzerland in 2009 after a municipal merger with Wiesen. Davos lost that distinction after the formation of Glarus Süd in 2010 and today is the fourth-largest municipality in the canton of the Grisons.

=== Climate ===
Davos has a subalpine climate (Köppen Dfc) with an average of 125.3 days of precipitation per year and on average receives 1,046 mm (41.2 in) of precipitation.

The wettest month is August, during which time Davos receives an average of 150 mm (5.9 in) of precipitation. During this month, there is precipitation for an average of 13.6 days. The month with the most days of precipitation is July, with an average of 13.8, but with only 133 mm (5.2 in) of precipitation. The driest month of the year is February with an average of 52 mm (2.0 in) of precipitation over 7.9 days, of which 74 cm (29 in) in 11.1 days are snowfall.

Climate data for Davos, elevation 1,594 m (5,230 ft), (1991–2020 normals, extremes 1876–present)
Month	Jan	Feb	Mar	Apr	May	Jun	Jul	Aug	Sep	Oct	Nov	Dec	Year
Record high °C (°F)	14.3 (57.7)	14.1 (57.4)	20.6 (69.1)	20.4 (68.7)	28.0 (82.4)	29.8 (85.6)	30.0 (86.0)	29.0 (84.2)	26.1 (79.0)	23.3 (73.9)	19.5 (67.1)	12.0 (53.6)	30.0 (86.0)
Mean daily maximum °C (°F)	0.0 (32.0)	1.2 (34.2)	4.6 (40.3)	8.3 (46.9)	12.8 (55.0)	16.5 (61.7)	18.5 (65.3)	18.2 (64.8)	14.2 (57.6)	10.8 (51.4)	4.8 (40.6)	0.6 (33.1)	9.2 (48.6)
Daily mean °C (°F)	−4.7 (23.5)	−4.2 (24.4)	−0.7 (30.7)	3.0 (37.4)	7.4 (45.3)	11.0 (51.8)	12.8 (55.0)	12.6 (54.7)	8.7 (47.7)	5.1 (41.2)	0.0 (32.0)	−3.6 (25.5)	4.0 (39.2)
Mean daily minimum °C (°F)	−8.8 (16.2)	−9.0 (15.8)	−5.5 (22.1)	−2.0 (28.4)	2.3 (36.1)	5.8 (42.4)	7.6 (45.7)	7.7 (45.9)	4.1 (39.4)	0.8 (33.4)	−3.8 (25.2)	−7.2 (19.0)	−0.7 (30.7)
Record low °C (°F)	−32.0 (−25.6)	−30.2 (−22.4)	−25.7 (−14.3)	−20.0 (−4.0)	−15.8 (3.6)	−3.5 (25.7)	−1.1 (30.0)	−9.9 (14.2)	−6.5 (20.3)	−15.5 (4.1)	−23.7 (−10.7)	−26.2 (−15.2)	−32.0 (−25.6)
Average precipitation mm (inches)	70.1 (2.76)	52.0 (2.05)	56.7 (2.23)	54.4 (2.14)	88.7 (3.49)	128.7 (5.07)	133.1 (5.24)	149.5 (5.89)	96.3 (3.79)	77.1 (3.04)	71.2 (2.80)	68.1 (2.68)	1,045.9 (41.18)
Average snowfall cm (inches)	89.4 (35.2)	74.1 (29.2)	64.6 (25.4)	43.1 (17.0)	7.3 (2.9)	2.2 (0.9)	0.6 (0.2)	0.8 (0.3)	4.9 (1.9)	22.2 (8.7)	59.5 (23.4)	83.2 (32.8)	451.9 (177.9)
Average precipitation days (≥ 1.0 mm)	8.8	7.9	8.9	9.0	12.0	13.7	13.8	13.6	10.0	8.7	9.1	9.8	125.3
Average snowy days (≥ 1.0 cm)	11.7	11.1	10.3	7.3	2.1	0.4	0.1	0.1	0.8	3.4	9.1	11.6	68.0
Average relative humidity (%)	76	73	71	69	71	73	74	76	77	75	77	78	74
Mean monthly sunshine hours	110.6	119.8	153.8	152.4	154.1	167.0	187.5	179.3	159.7	144.6	102.6	93.4	1,724.8
Percentage possible sunshine	54	53	51	48	45	48	53	54	53	54	49	48	51
Source 1: NOAA
Source 2: MeteoSwissInfoclimat (extremes)

== Politics ==
=== Government ===
The Small Country Council (Kleiner Landrat) constitutes the executive government of the municipality of Davos and operates as a collegiate authority. It is composed of five councilors (German: Landrat/-rätin), each presiding over a department (Departement) comprising several bureaus. The president of the executive department acts as president of the municipality (Landammann or Gemeindepräsident). In the mandate period 2025–2028 (Legislatur), the Small Country Council is presided by Landammann Philipp Wilhelm. Departmental tasks, coordination measures and implementation of laws decreed by the Grand Country Council are carried by the Small Country Council. The regular election of the municipal councils by any inhabitant valid to vote is held every four years. Any resident of the municipality of Davos allowed to vote and being registered can be elected as a member of the Small Country Council for a maximal period of twelve years. The delegates are selected by means of a system of Majorz. The President is elected as such as well by a public election while the heads of the other departments are assigned by the collegiate. They usually meet once a week.

As of 2025, Davos's Small Country Council is made up of two members of SP (Social Democratic Party), of whom one is the president), and one each of FDP (FDP.The Liberals), SVP (Swiss People's Party), and GLP (Green Liberal Party). The last regular election (Landschaftswahlen) was held on 22 September 2024.

The Small Country Council (Kleiner Landrat) of Davos
Country Councilor (Landrat/-rätin)	Party	Head of Department (Vorsteher(in), since) of	Elected since
Philipp Wilhelm (Note: President (Landammann or Gemeindepräsident))	SP	President's Office (Präsidialdepartement, 2021)	2020
Claudia Bieler	SP	Civil Engineering and Public Facilities (Departement Tiefbau + öffentliche Betriebe, 2025)	2024
Valérie Favre Accola (Note: Vice President (Statthalter or Gemeindevizepräsident))	SVP	Structural Engineering and Environmental Protection and Energy (Departement Hochbau + Umweltschutz + Energie, 2025)	2024
Walter von Ballmoos	GLP	Education and Social Services (Departement Bildung + Soziales, 15 November 2023)	2023
Jürg Zürcher	FDP	Health and Security (Departement Gesundheit + Sicherheit, 2021)	2020

=== Parliament ===
The Grosse Landrat of Davos for the mandate period of 2025–2028
1. SP (23.5%)
2. glp (5.90%)
3. Center (11.8%)
4. FDP (29.4%)
5. SVP (29.4%)

The Grand Country Council (Grosser Landrat) holds legislative power. It is made up of 17 members, with elections held every four years. The Grand Country Council decrees regulations and by-laws that are executed by the Small Country Council and the administration. The delegates are selected by means of a system of Majorz.

The sessions of the Grand Country Council are public. They usually meet ten times a year. Members of the Grand Country Council are not politicians by profession, and they are paid a fee based on their attendance. Any resident of Davos allowed to vote can be elected as a member of the Grand Country Council for a maximal period of twelve years.

The last regular election of the Grand Country Council was held on 22 September 2024 for the mandate period (German: Legislatur) from January 2025 to December 2028. Currently the Grand Country Council consist of 5 (-1) Liberals (FDP/PLR), 5 (+2) Swiss People's Party (SVP/UDC), 4 (+1) members of Social Democratic Party (SP/PS), 2 (+1) Center Party, and 1 (-1) members of the Green Liberal Party (glp/pvl).

=== Federal elections ===
In the 2023 federal election the most popular party was the SVP with 29.1%, (+9.1) of the votes. The next four parties were the SP (17.4%, -3.9), Central Party (16.4%, +10.6), FDP (15.6%, +5.5), and the glp (12.0%, +5.2). In the federal election, a total of 2'874 votes were cast, and the voter turnout was 42.9%.

In the 2019 federal election the most popular party was the SP with 21.3% (+7.6) of the votes. The next four parties were the SVP (20.0%, -10.0), FDP (10.1%, -10.3), CVP (6.8%, +1.6), and the glp (6.8%, -5.3). In the federal election, a total of 2'885 votes were cast, and the voter turnout was 41.8%.

In the 2015 federal election the most popular party was the SVP with 30.0% of the votes. The next five parties were the FDP (20.4%), the BDP (15.8%), the SP (14.7%), the glp (12.1%), and CVP (5.2%). In the federal election, a total of 3,231 votes were cast, and the voter turnout was 46.7%.

=== Sister cities ===
Davos has sister city agreements with:

- (United States) Aspen, Colorado
- (France) Chamonix-Mont-Blanc
- (Japan) Ueda, Nagano

== Demographics ==
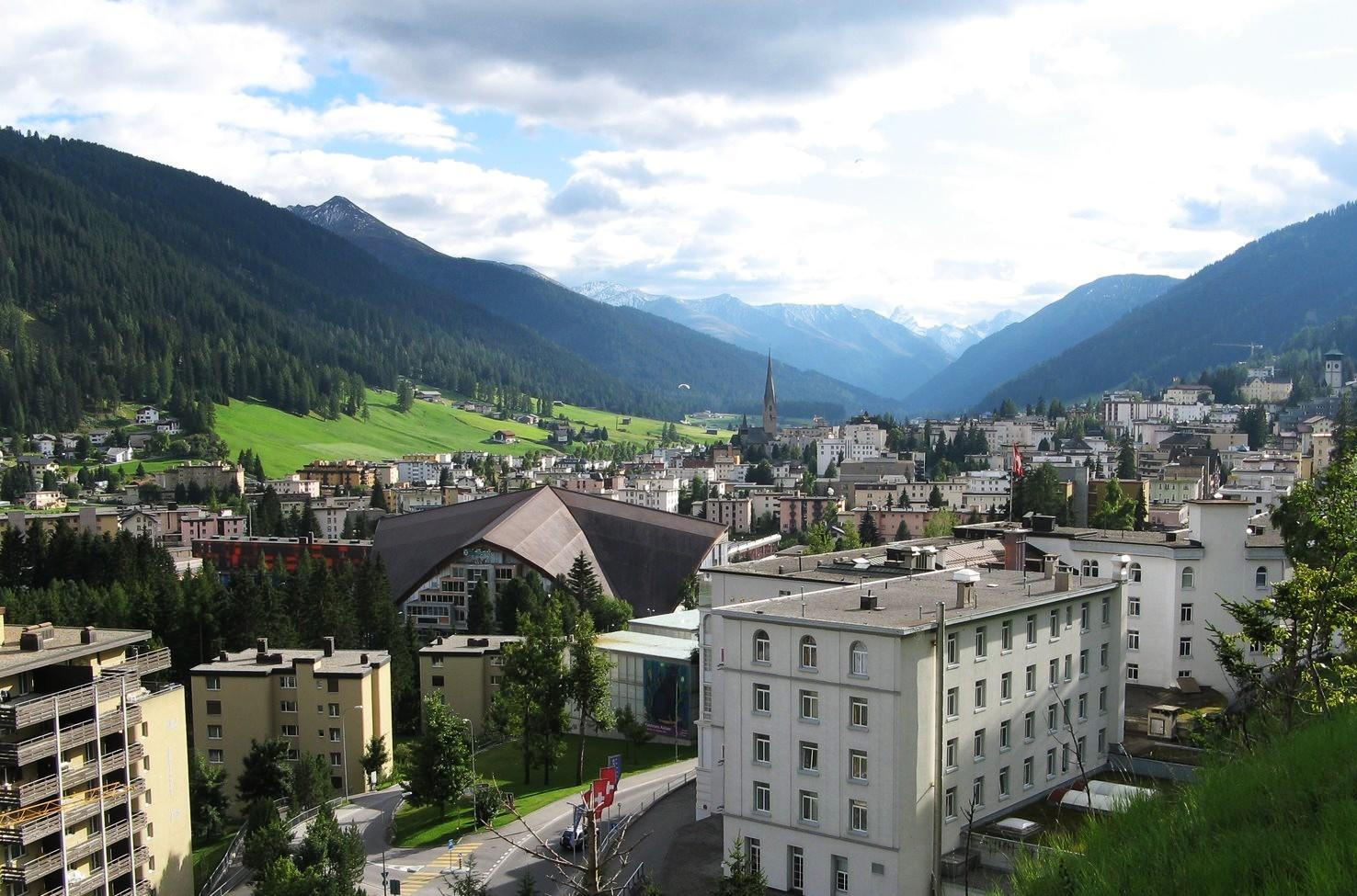
Davos with the Vaillant Arena (center)

=== Population ===
Davos has a population (as of December 2020) of 10,832. As of 2014, 27.0% of the population are resident foreign nationals. In 2015 7.3% of the population was born in Germany and 6.9% of the population was born in Portugal. Over the last four years (2010–2014) the population has changed at a rate of -0.27%. The birth rate in the municipality, in 2014, was 9.1, while the death rate was 8.2 per thousand residents.

Most of the population (as of 2000) speaks German (86.3%), with Serbo-Croatian being second most common (2.8%) and Italian being third (2.7%).

As of 2014, children and teenagers (0–19 years old) make up 17.3% of the population, while adults (20–64 years old) are 64.5% and seniors (over 64 years old) make up 18.2%. In 2015 there were 5,099 single residents, 4,666 people who were married or in a civil partnership, 550 widows or widowers and 794 divorced residents.

In 2014 there were 5,441 private households in Davos with an average household size of 2.03 persons. Of the 2,133 inhabited buildings in the municipality, in 2000, about 30.7% were single family homes and 39.1% were multiple family buildings. Additionally, about 25.9% of the buildings were built before 1919, while 8.3% were built between 1991 and 2000. In 2013 the rate of construction of new housing units per 1000 residents was 23.46. The vacancy rate for the municipality, in 2015, was 0.71%.

==== Historic population ====
The historic population is given in the following chart:

=== Education ===
In Davos about 74% of the population (ages 25–64) have completed either non-mandatory upper secondary education or additional higher education (either a university or a Fachhochschule).

=== Economy ===
Davos is a tourist community and a regional center.

As of 2014, there were a total of 8,853 people employed in the municipality. Of these, a total of 203 people worked in 80 businesses in the primary economic sector. The secondary sector employed 996 workers in 145 separate businesses. Finally, the tertiary sector provided 7,654 jobs in 926 businesses. In 2014 a total of 5,211 employees worked in 908 small companies (less than 50 employees). There were 17 mid sized businesses with 2,074 employees and 1 large business which employed 369 people. In 2014 a total of 23.5% of the population received social assistance.

In 2015 local hotels had a total of 797,348 overnight stays, of which 46.9% were international visitors.

=== Religion ===
From the 2000 census, 5,321 residents (46.6% of the population) belonged to the Swiss Reformed Church while 3,950 residents (34.6%) are Roman Catholic. Of the rest of the population, there were 10 individuals (or about 0.09% of the population) who belong to the Christian Catholic faith, 439 individuals (3.85% of the population) who belonged to the Orthodox Church, 274 (2.40%) who belonged to another Christian church, 79 (0.69%) who were Muslim, 56 (0.49%) who belonged to another faith (not listed), and eight residents (0.07%) were Jewish. In addition, 832 residents (7.29%) belonged to no faith, were agnostic or atheist, and 448 individuals (3.92%) did not answer the question.

== Sports ==
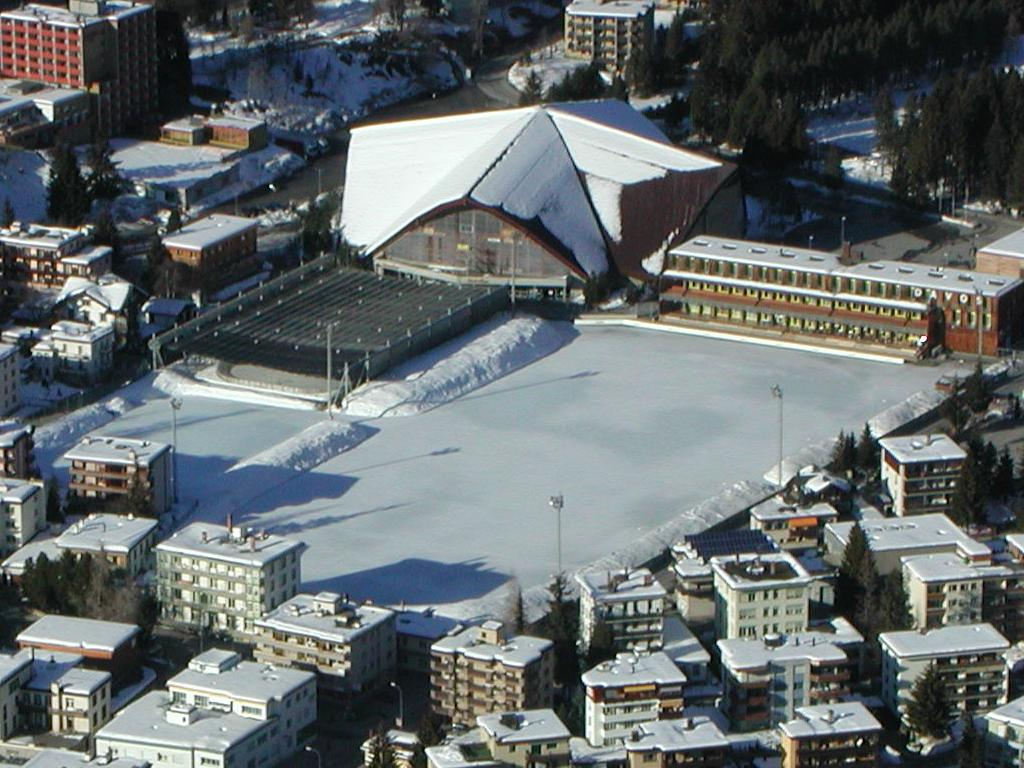
The ice stadium, including the largest natural ice skating field in Europe

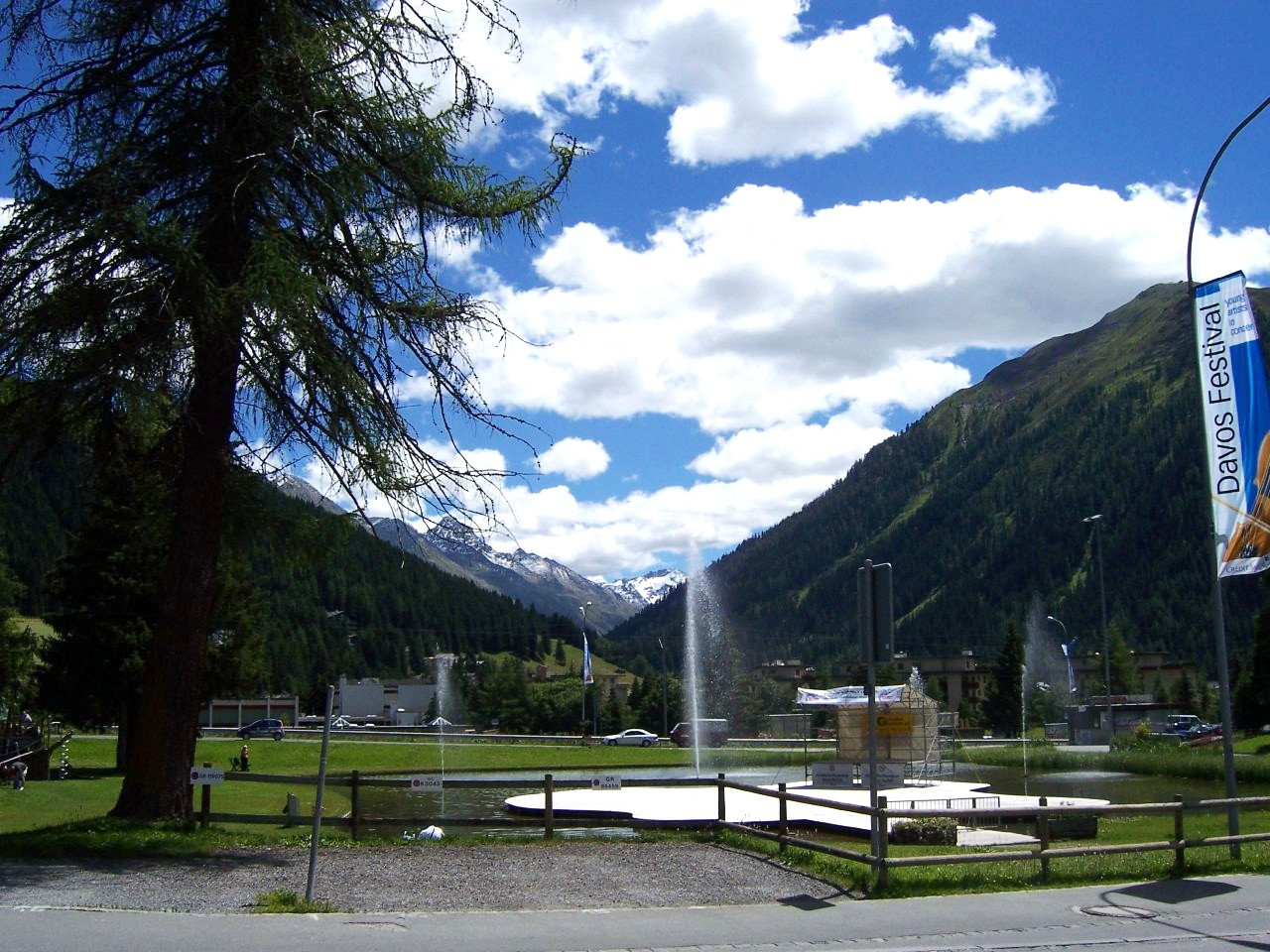
Park on the Promenade

Davos's ice hockey team, HC Davos, plays in the National League (NL). Their home arena is the Vaillant Arena. In December of each year, the team and arena host the Spengler Cup, an international tournament first held in 1923.

Besides cross-country skiing, offering some 97 km (60 mi) of pistes, Davos has the largest natural ice skating field in Europe. Bandy is occasionally played there. An international tournament, starting in 2014, has been organised. The 1913 European Bandy Championships in Davos is so far the only one of its kind.

Davos has long been a place for the devotees of ice skating, as well as the sport of figure skating. The Dutch, Germans, and Russians have skated there as early as the 1860s. In 1877, the Hotel Belvédère opened a rink used mostly by British skaters; according to figure skating historian James R. Hines, a second rink was opened shortly afterwards to accommodate skaters from Germany and Russia. The Davos Skating Club, which eventually had over 200 members from all over the world, was formed in 1880. Davos hosted eleven World Championships in the years before World War II.

There are six main ski areas in winter, with a total of 320 kilometres (200 mi) of slopes:

- Parsenn / Gotschna which connects to the partner town of Klosters from Davos Dorf
- Jakobshorn which can be reached from Davos Platz directly
- Pischahorn which can be reached by frequently running buses into Flüela valley
- Rinerhorn to start from Davos Glaris
- Madrisahorn located in neighbouring Klosters
- Schatzalp is privately owned by the Schatzalp Hotel and a specialty as a "decelerated" skiing area

All areas offer summer transport as well on to the main peaks from mid May until end of October. The remote side valleys heading towards the Engadine area are worth long hikes towards the passes of Sertig or Scaletta Pass to reach, for example, Piz Kesch, an Ultra prominent peak. To the north there are no valleys but rather a direct one-day ascent to continue across a pass into the "Schanfigg" valley towards the rival resort of Arosa or even to continue to Lenzerheide in a two-day hike.

== Culture ==
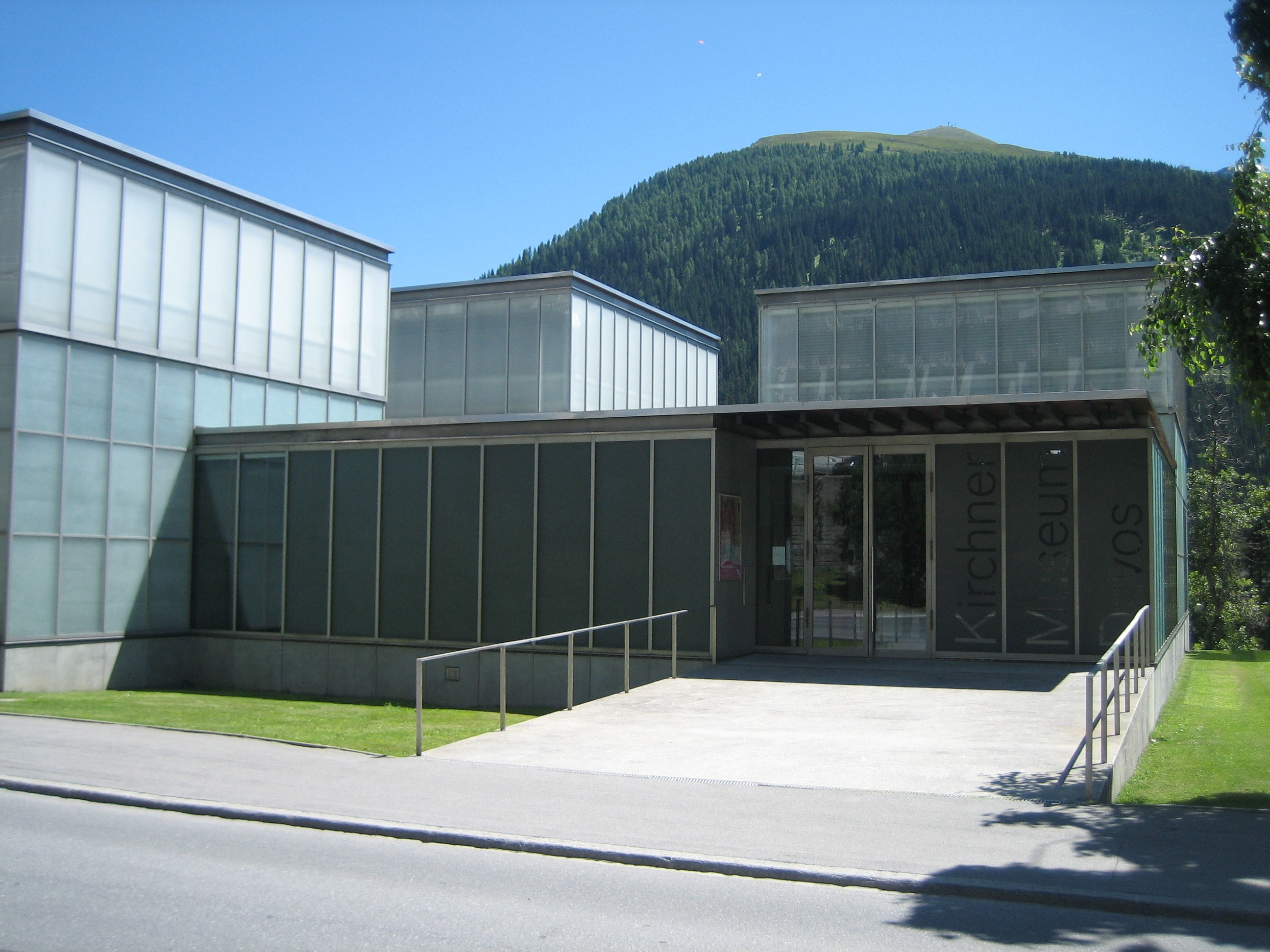
The Kirchner Museum

Davos is home to seven sites that are listed as Swiss heritage sites of national significance.

These heritage sites include the Town Archives, the Kirchner Museum, the Grosses Jenatschhaus (a type of charity house known as a Pfrundhaus) and the Forest Cemetery (Waldfriedhof). Several hotels and spas are also included on the list. The three hotels or former hotels are: Berghotel Schatzalp, the former Grand Hotel Belvédère, and the Zürcher Höhenklinik von R. Gaberel.

Davos hosts annual meetings of the World Economic Forum. The city was featured in an episode of Viva La Bam, when cities around Europe were visited. On 14 March 2003, a festival called Winterjam was held in the city and bands such as Sum 41, Crazy Town, and Guano Apes performed during this event.

== Transport ==
Davos is part of the rail network of the Rhaetian Railway (RhB). The RhB has two main stations in Davos: Davos Dorf (northeast) and Davos Platz (southwest). Other stations in the municipality include Davos Wolfgang and Davos Laret towards Klosters, and Davos Frauenkirch, Davos Glaris, Davos Monstein, and Davos Wiesen towards Filisur.

The valley station Davos Dorf (Parsennbahn) of the funicular Parsennbahn to Weissfluhjoch (Parsenn) is in Davos Dorf, the station Davos Platz Schatzalpbahn of Schatzalp-Bahn in Davos Platz. Also in Davos Platz are the bottom stations of the cable car to the Jakobshorn, the station Davos Platz DKB (right next to the corresponding railway station), and also that of the chair lift to Usser Isch, namely the Davos Platz (Talstation Carjöl).

The bottom station of the lift to Rinerhorn is right next to RhB station Davos Glaris. The one (Dörfji) of the Pischa area in the side valley of the Flüela, reachable by bus.

Local buses are operated by Verkehrsbetrieb der Landschaft Davos Gemeinde (vbd).

== Research ==
Davos has several research institutes: the AO Foundation focusing on trauma and disorders of the musculoskeletal system, the Swiss Institute of Allergy and Asthma Research (SIAF), the World Radiation Center (PMOD/WRC) and the Institute for Snow and Avalanche Research (SLF) of the Swiss Federal Institute for Forest, Snow and Landscape Research (WSL).

== Notable people ==
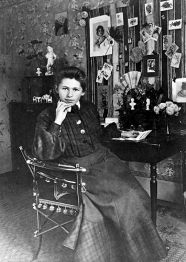
Sophie Taeuber-Arp, 1903

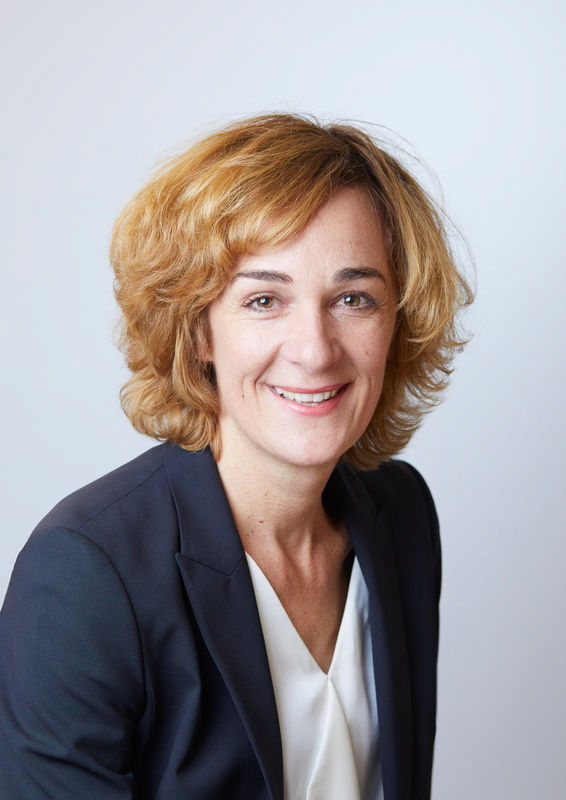
Ursula Wyss, 2018

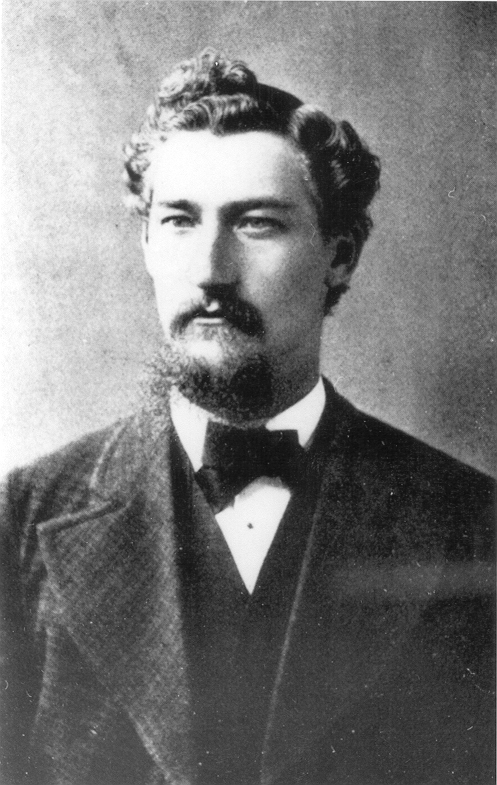
Carl Rüedi, c. 1885

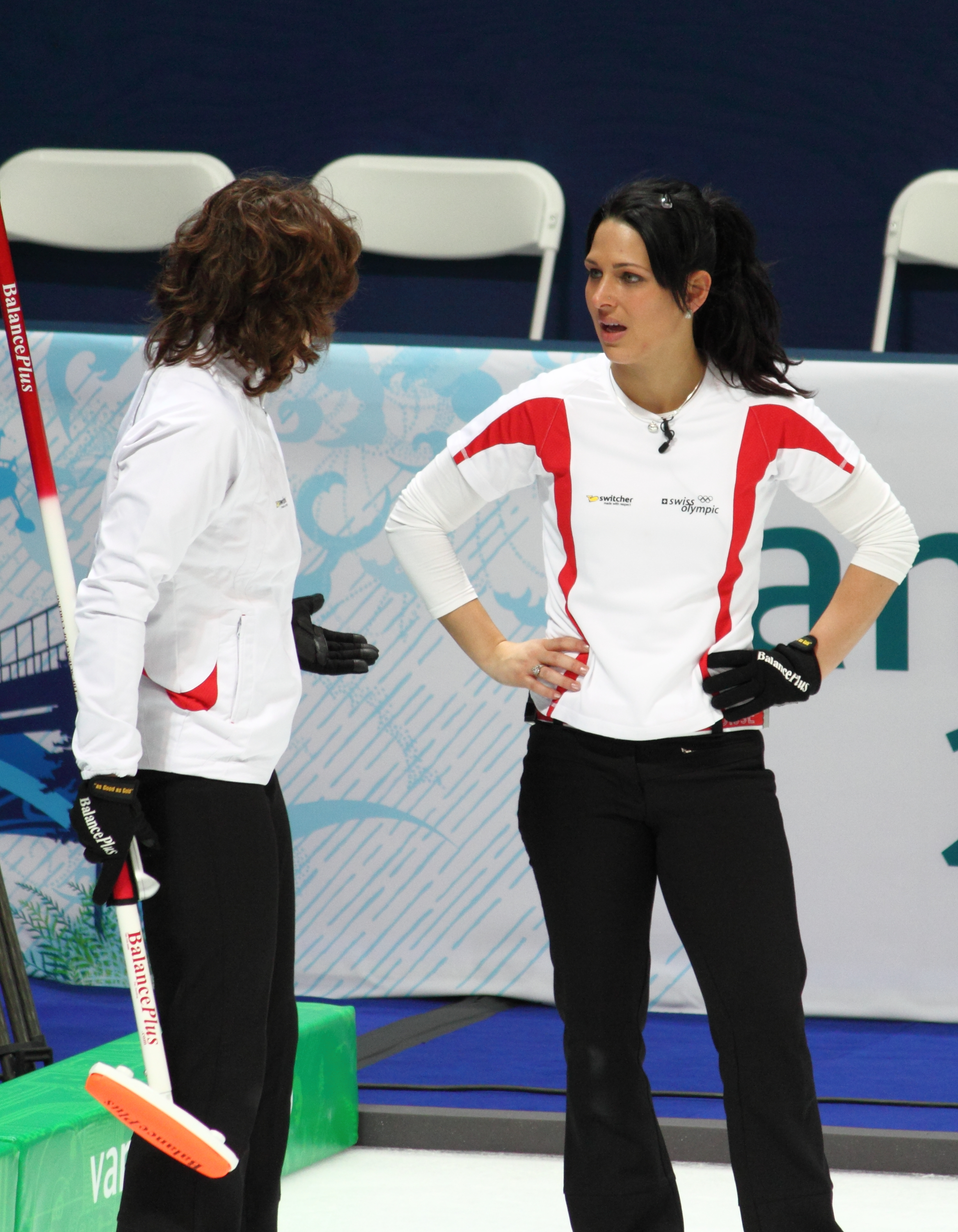
Carmen Schäfer (right), 2010

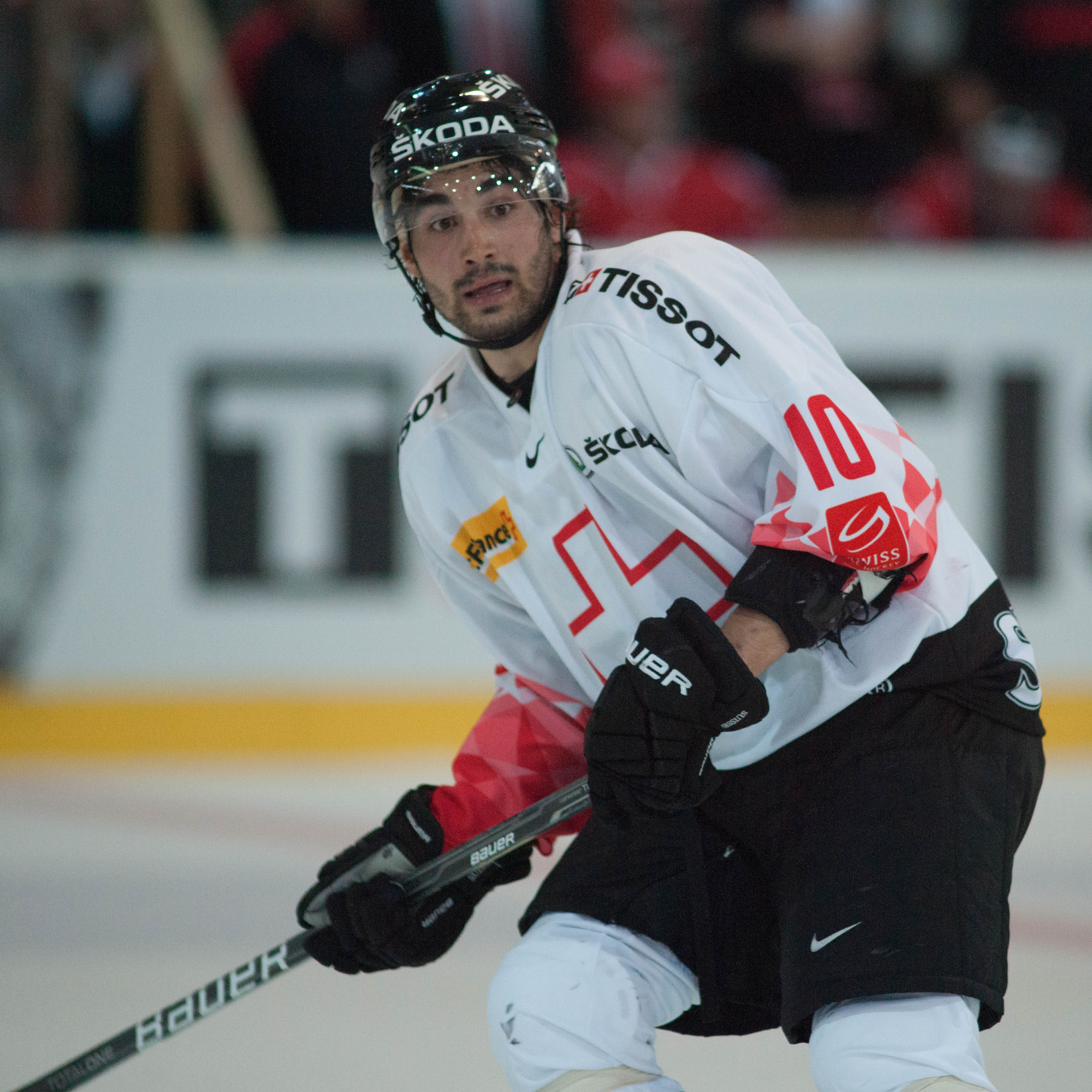
Andres Ambühl, 2012

=== The arts ===
- Sophie Taeuber-Arp (1889 in Davos – 1943), painter, sculptor, architect and dancer
- Dorothea Wieck (1908 in Davos – 1986), a German theatre and film actress
- Ernst Haefliger (1919 in Davos – 2007), tenor
- Eberhard W. Kornfeld (1923–2023), art collector; made Honorary citizen of Davos in 2004
- Jürg Federspiel (1931–2007), writer, grew up in Davos
- Thomas Hirschhorn (born 1957), artist, grew up in Davos
- Marc Forster (born 1969), German and Swiss director and filmmaker, grew up in Davos made freeman of Davos in 2007

=== Politics, public service and business ===
- Wilhelm Vischer (1895 in Davos – 1988), a pastor, theologian, Hebraist, Old Testament scholar and amateur Lied lyricist
- Ursula Wyss (born 1973 in Davos), economist, Swiss National Councillor 1999–2013 and former Municipal Councilor of Bern

=== Science, medicine & TB patients ===
- Alexander Spengler (1827–1901), a German and Swiss physician, specialised in TB in Davos
- John Addington Symonds (1840–1893), an English poet and literary critic, TB patient in Davos from 1877.
- Friedrich Miescher (1844–1895), biologist who discovered DNA, died in Davos
- Carl Rüedi (1848 in Davos – 1901), a pulmonologist, treated Robert Louis Stevenson
- Robert Louis Stevenson (1850–1894), Scottish novelist and travel writer, TB patient in Davos in the 1880s.
- Oscar Levertin (1862–1906), a Swedish poet and literary historian; lived in Davos 1888–1890.
- Ernst Ludwig Kirchner (1880–1938 in Davos), German artist, TB patient, lived in Davos from 1917; namesake of the local art museum
- Philipp Bauknecht (1884–1933 in Davos), German expressionist painter, TB patient from 1910
- Harry Clarke (1889–1931), an Irish stained-glass artist and book illustrator, TB patient from 1929, buried in Chur
- Klabund (1890–1928 in Davos), aka Alfred Henschke, German writer and painter, TB patient
- Micha Brumlik (1947 in Davos – 2025), a Swiss-German educational theorist and publicist

=== Sport ===
- Fritz Kraatz (1906–1992), ice hockey player, competed in the 1928 Winter Olympics
- Paul Söllner (1911 in Davos – 1991), German rower, competed in the 1936 Summer Olympics
- Albert Künzler (1911 in Davos – 1982), ice hockey player, competed in the 1936 Winter Olympics
- Andreas Däscher (1927 in Davos – 2023), ski jumper, competed at the 1956 Winter Olympics and developed the Daescher technique
- Franz Berry (1938 in Davos – 2009), ice hockey player, competed in the 1956 and 1964 Summer Olympics
- Peter Frei (born 1946 in Davos), alpine skier, competed in the 1968 Winter Olympics
- Nicolas Gilliard (born 1947 in Davos), swimmer, competed at the 1968 Summer Olympics
- Paul Accola (born 1967 in Davos), alpine skiing World Cup, overall champion
- Martina Accola (born 1969, Davos), alpine skier, competed in the 1994 and 1998 Winter Olympics
- Andrea Senteler (born 1977), cross-country skier, competed in the 1998 Winter Olympics
- Carmen Schäfer (born 1981 in Davos), a curler
- Andres Ambühl (born 1983 in Davos), ice hockey forward
- Iouri Podladtchikov (born 1988), a Russian-born Swiss snowboarder, brought up in Davos, gold medallist at the 2014 Winter Olympics
- Dino Wieser (born 1989 in Davos), ice hockey forward
- Stefanie Müller (born 1992 in Davos), Alpine snowboarder, competed at the 2014 Winter Olympics
- Claude-Curdin Paschoud (born 1994 in Davos), ice hockey defenceman

== See also ==
- Davos University Conferences
- Lake Davos
- List of ski areas and resorts in Switzerland
- Schwarzsee (Davos)
- The Magic Mountain
- Tourism in Switzerland
- World Economic Forum
