= Flüela Pass =

Swiss mountain pass

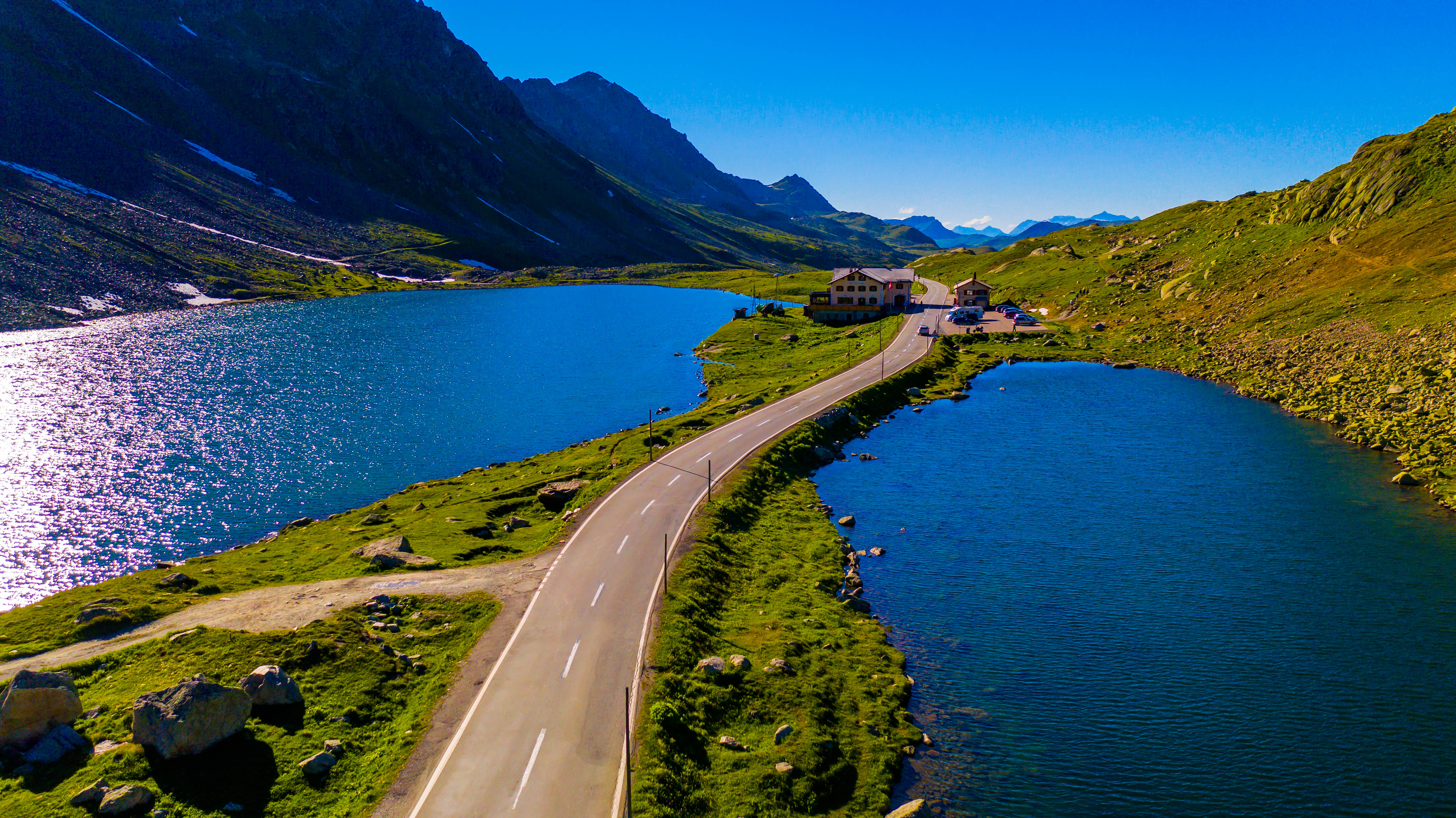
- Summit of the pass with Lai da la Scotta (left) and Lai Nair (right)

- Location within Switzerland
- Elevation: 2,384 metres (7,822 ft)
- Traversed by: Paved road

Third Approach
- Location: Graubünden, Switzerland
- Range: Alps
- Coordinates: 46°45′01″N 09°56′51″E

The Flüela Pass (German: Flüelapass, Romansh: Pass dal Flüela, elevation 2,384 m (7,822 ft)) is a high mountain pass of the Swiss Alps in Graubünden. Traditionally considered the boundary between the Albula and Silvretta Alps, the pass crosses the watershed / drainage divide between the basins of the rivers Rhine and Danube. The pass is overlooked by the Flüela Schwarzhorn (Albula Alps) and the Flüela Wisshorn (Silvretta Alps). The summit of the pass lies between the lakes Lai da la Scotta and Lai Nair.

The Flüela Pass is one of the three paved road passes connecting the Engadin with the northern Grisons, the two other being the Julier Pass and the Albula Pass.

The Flüela Pass is traversed by a paved road. The latter road connects Davos (central Graubünden) with Susch (Engadin). On the summit of the pass is the Flüela Hospice. Since 1999, the range can be traversed by rail as well, although at a drastically lower elevation, through the Vereina Tunnel. The line, operated by the Rhaetian Railway, connects Klosters with Susch and Lavin and runs about 5-7 kilometres northeast of the Flüela road, parallel to it. Car shuttle trains are also operated on the line. As a result, the pass road is no longer guaranteed to be open all year.

An NGO, Pro Flüela Verein, was established in 1990 to extend the opening outside the summer months. It raises money from membership fees, and grants from the cantonal government and local communes.

== See also ==
- List of mountain passes in Switzerland
- List of highest road passes in Switzerland
- List of highest paved roads in Switzerland
