= Schwarzhorn (Flüela) =

Mountain in Switzerland

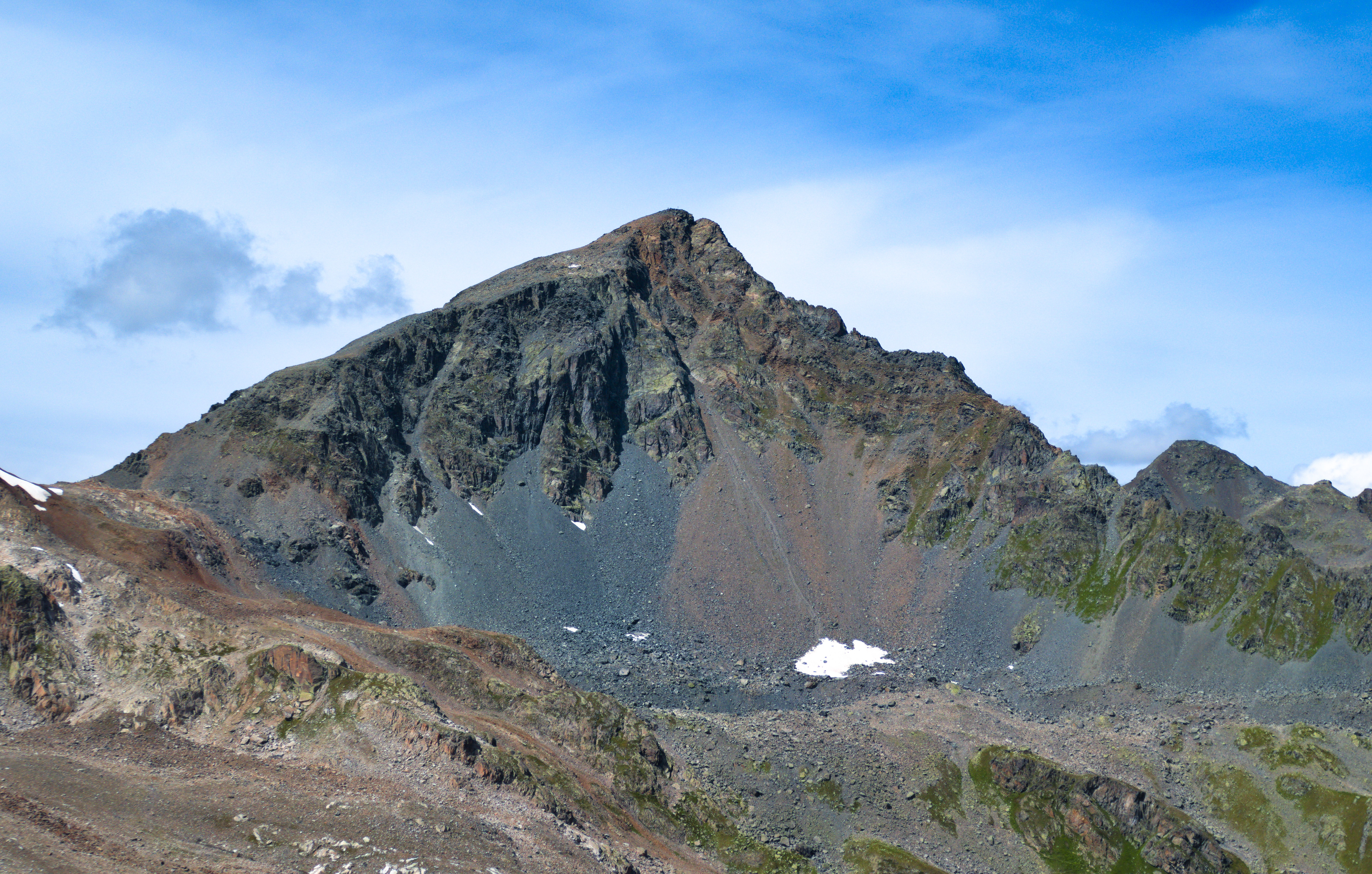
- Schwarzhorn from the Fuorcla Radönt

Highest point
- Elevation: 3,146 m (10,322 ft)
- Prominence: 609 m (1,998 ft)
- Parent peak: Piz Kesch
- Listing: Alpine mountains above 3000 m
- Coordinates: 46°44′6″N 9°56′30″E

Naming
- Native name: Schwarzhorn (German)

Geography
- Location within Switzerland
- Country: Switzerland
- Canton: Graubünden
- Parent range: Albula Alps
- Topo map: Swisstopo maps

The Flüela Schwarzhorn is a mountain of the Albula Alps, overlooking the Flüela Pass, in the canton of Graubünden. With a height of 3,146 metres above sea level, it is the highest point of the Albula Alps north of the Fuorcla da Grialetsch (2,537 m). From the Flüela Pass a trail leads to the summit.

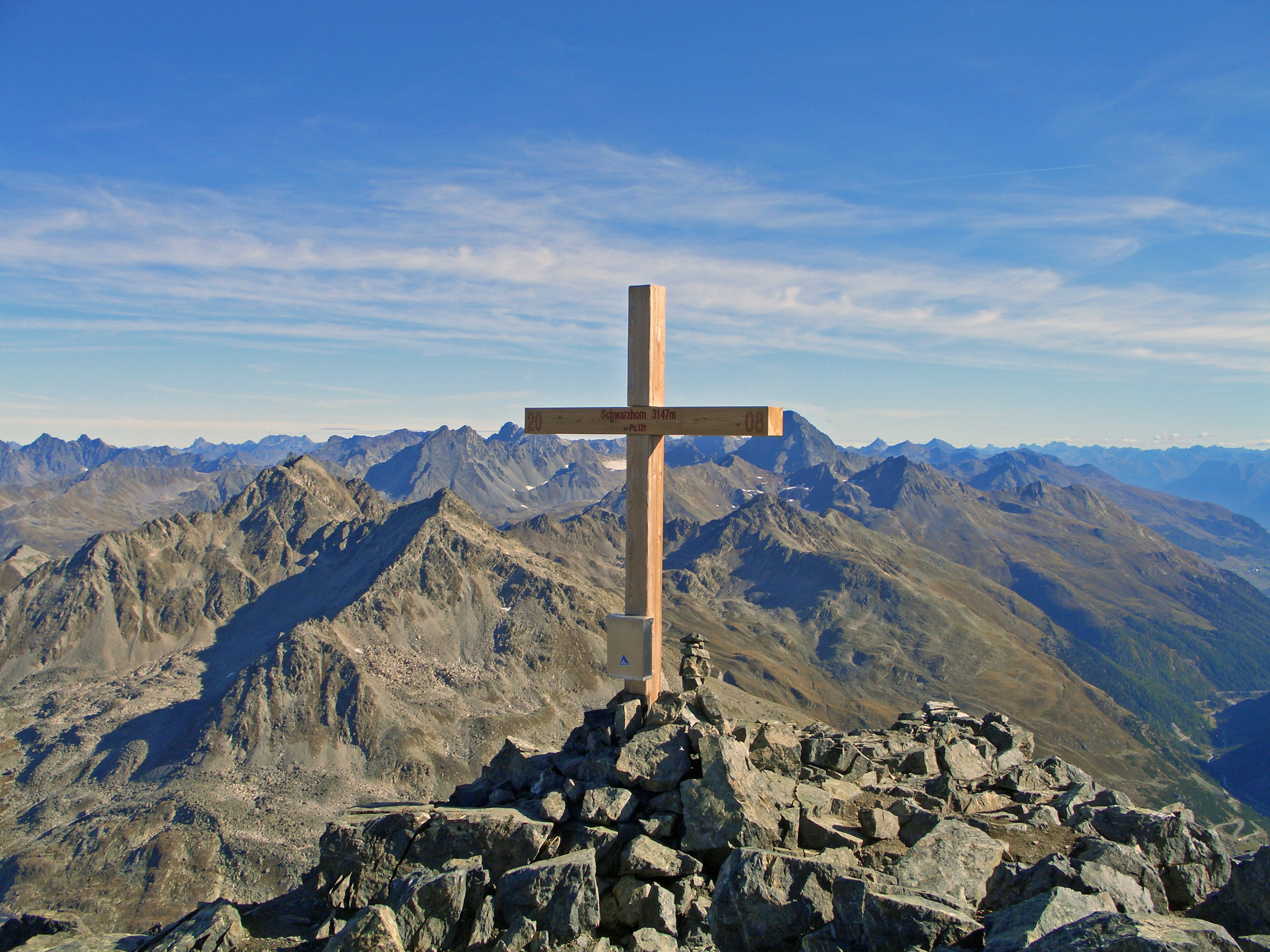
View from the top
