= Bergün/Bravuogn =

- Former municipality
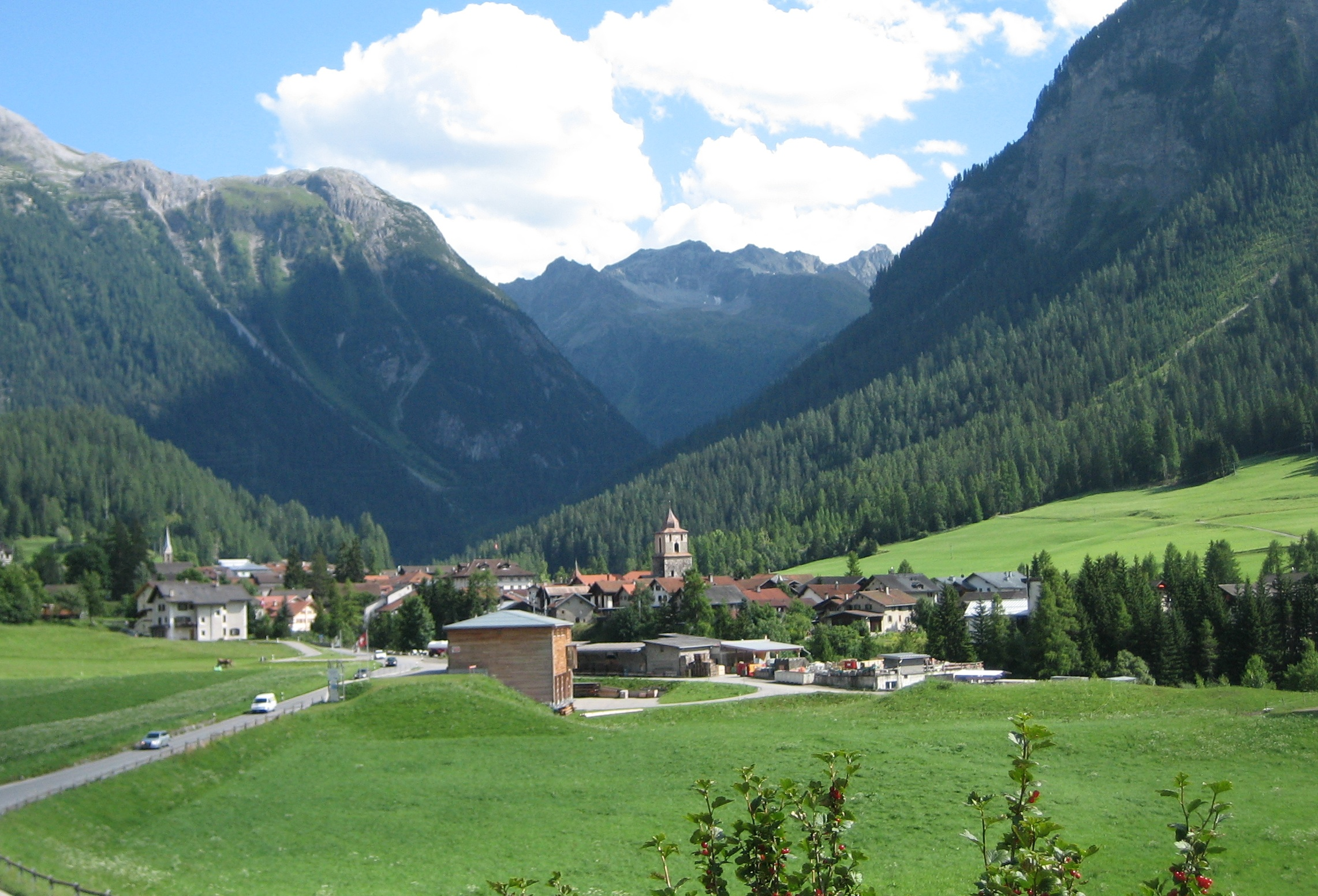
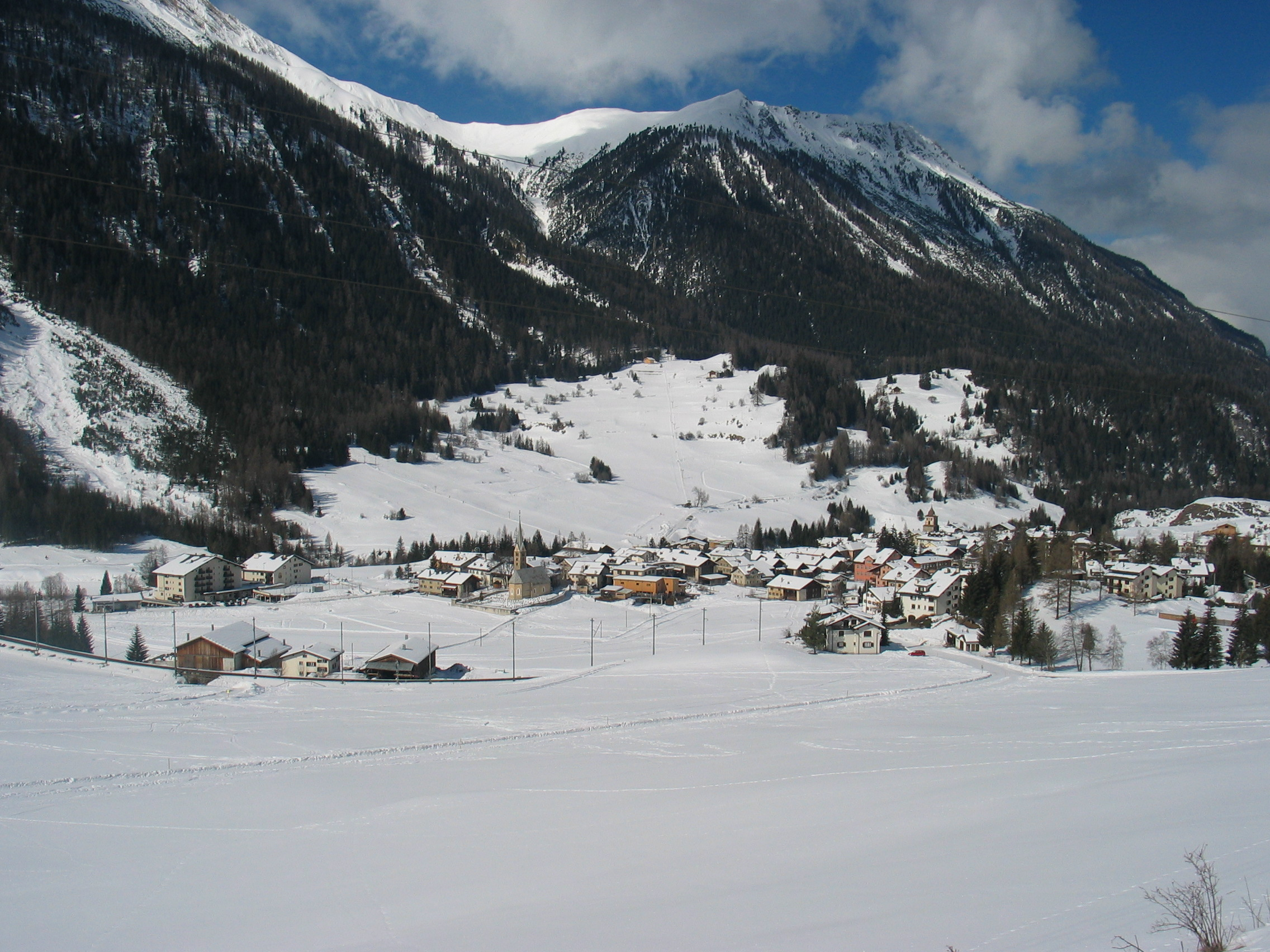

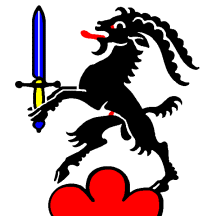
- Flag Coat of arms
- Location of Bergün/Bravuogn
- Location within Switzerland Location within Canton of Graubünden
- Coordinates: 46°37′N 9°45′E
- Country: Switzerland
- Canton: Graubünden
- District: Albula

Area
  - Total: 145.65 km^{2} (56.24 sq mi)
- Elevation: 1,367 m (4,485 ft)

Population (December 2020)
  - Total: 480
  - Density: 3.3/km^{2} (8.5/sq mi)
- Time zone: UTC+01:00 (CET)
  - Summer (DST): UTC+02:00 (CEST)
- Postal code: 7482
- SFOS number: 3521
- ISO 3166 code: CH-GR
- Localities: Bergün, Latsch, Stuls, Preda
- Surrounded by: Bever, Davos, Filisur, La Punt Chamues-ch, Samedan, S-chanf, Tinizong-Rona, Wiesen, Zuoz
- Twin towns: Hallau (Switzerland)
- Website: berguen.ch

Bergün/Bravuogn (German: Bergün, Romansh: Bravuogn, in the local Romansh dialect Brauégn) is a village and former municipality in the Albula Region in the canton of Graubünden in Switzerland. The double name (German/Romansh) has been the official name since 1943. On 1 January 2018 the former municipalities of Bergün/Bravuogn and Filisur merged into the new municipality of Bergün Filisur.

== History ==
Bergün/Bravuogn is first mentioned in 1209 as de Bregonio.

== Geography ==
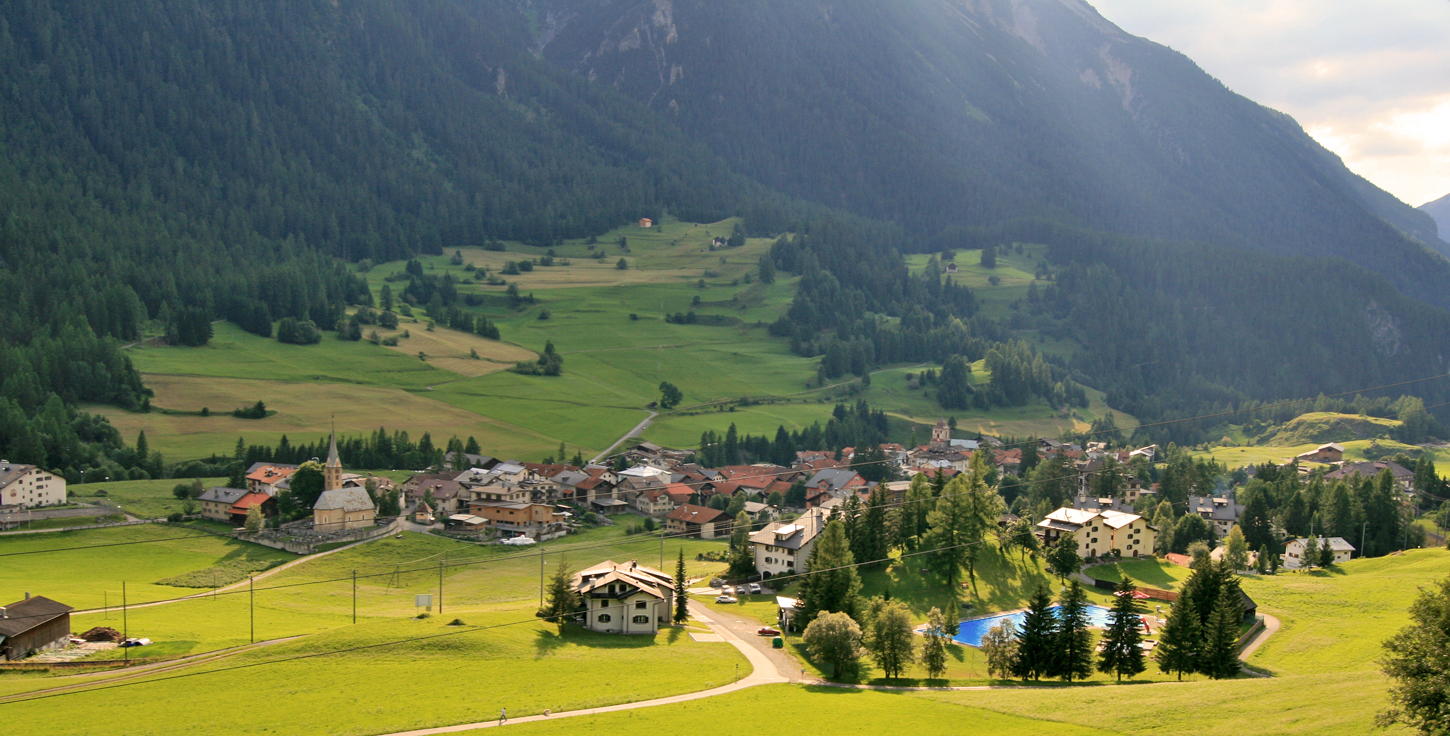
Bergün

Aerial view from 3500 m by Walter Mittelholzer (1923)

Bergün/Bravuogn has an area, as of 2006, of 145.6 km^{2} (56.2 sq mi). Of this area, 21.4% is used for agricultural purposes, while 20.4% is forested. Of the rest of the land, 0.8% is settled (buildings or roads) and the remainder (57.5%) is non-productive (rivers, glaciers or mountains).

Before 2017, the municipality was located in the Bergün sub-district of the Albula district, after 2017 it was part of the Albula Region. It is located on the Albula river and along the Albula Pass road. Lai da Ravais-ch is within the village.

It consists of the linear village of Bergün/Bravuogn and the settlements of Latsch (on the right side terrace above the river) and Stugl/Stuls. Latsch joined the municipality in 1912 and Stugl/Stuls joined in 1920. From Stugl/Stuls towards Albula pass the settlement of Preda can be found which became a temporary village when the Albula railway tunnel was built between 1898 and 1903. Lai da Palpuogna, a mountain lake, is located between Preda and Albula Pass. Until 1943 Bergün/Bravuogn was known as Bergün.

== Demographics ==
Bergün/Bravuogn has a population (as of 31 December 2020) of 480. As of 2008, 11.1% of the population was made up of foreign nationals. Over the last 10 years the population has decreased at a rate of -10.2%.

In the 2007 federal election the most popular party was the SVP which received 41.9% of the vote. The next three most popular parties were the SPS (31.6%), the FDP (19.1%) and the CVP (6.3%).

The entire Swiss population is generally well educated. In Bergün/Bravuogn about 74.6% of the population (between age 25-64) have completed either non-mandatory upper secondary education or additional higher education (either university or a Fachhochschule).

Bergün/Bravuogn has an unemployment rate of 1.48%. As of 2005, there were 59 people employed in the primary economic sector and about 12 businesses involved in this sector. 58 people are employed in the secondary sector and there are 11 businesses in this sector. 153 people are employed in the tertiary sector, with 36 businesses in this sector.

As of 2000, the gender distribution of the population was 56.4% male and 43.6% female. The age distribution, as of 2000, in Bergün/Bravuogn is; 53 people or 10.2% of the population are between 0 and 9 years old. 36 people or 6.9% are 10 to 14, and 38 people or 7.3% are 15 to 19. Of the adult population, 62 people or 11.9% of the population are between 20 and 29 years old. 77 people or 14.8% are 30 to 39, 81 people or 15.6% are 40 to 49, and 56 people or 10.8% are 50 to 59. The senior population distribution is 45 people or 8.7% of the population are between 60 and 69 years old, 38 people or 7.3% are 70 to 79, there are 28 people or 5.4% who are 80 to 89, there are 5 people or 1.0% who are 90 to 99, and 1 person or 0.2% who is 100 or more.

The historical population is given in the following table:

year	population
1571	542
1803	495
1850	637
1900	1,537
1950	608
1970	451
1980	459
1990	480
2000	715

== Languages ==
In the 2000 census, the inhabitants claimed the following languages: German 83.9%, Romansh 10.6%, Italian 3.1%. The Romansh speakers have their own spoken dialect and write Putèr. Until the 19th century, this was the common tongue of most of the population (as of 1880, 80.4%). But Romansh quickly lost ground (as of 1910, only 57.62%). Then, the process stabilized until World War II (as of 1941, still 53.6% Romansh-speaking). Since then, the loss of Romansh has sped up.

Languages in Bergün/Bravuogn
Language	1980 Census		1990 Census		2000 Census	
Language	Number	Percentage	Number	Percentage	Number	Percentage
German	251	54.68%	350	72.92%	436	83.85%
Romansh	158	34.42%	101	21.04%	55	10.58%
Italian	40	8.71%	21	4.38%	16	3.08%
Population	459	100%	480	100%	520	100%

== Heritage sites of national significance ==
The municipal church and the Chasa Jenatsch with its barn are listed as heritage sites of national significance.

The park area of Ela Parc includes the whole of the Albula valley and invites hikers into an unspoilt landscape; hopes of the people from Bergün to join international tourism after the building of the Albula Railway to St. Moritz proved not to develop, so the Kurhaus Bergün remained the only Hotel built in 1905/06, allowing the village to remain rather unspoilt.

The Albula Railway became a UNESCO World Heritage Site itself in 2008. It maintains the Bahnmuseum Albula at the local railway station. The museum documents the construction of the Albula line.

== Transportation ==
Bergün/Bravuogn (Rhaetian Railway station) is located just to the north of the village. Postbus also operate buses though Bergün/Bravuogn.
