= Vaz/Obervaz =

- Municipality
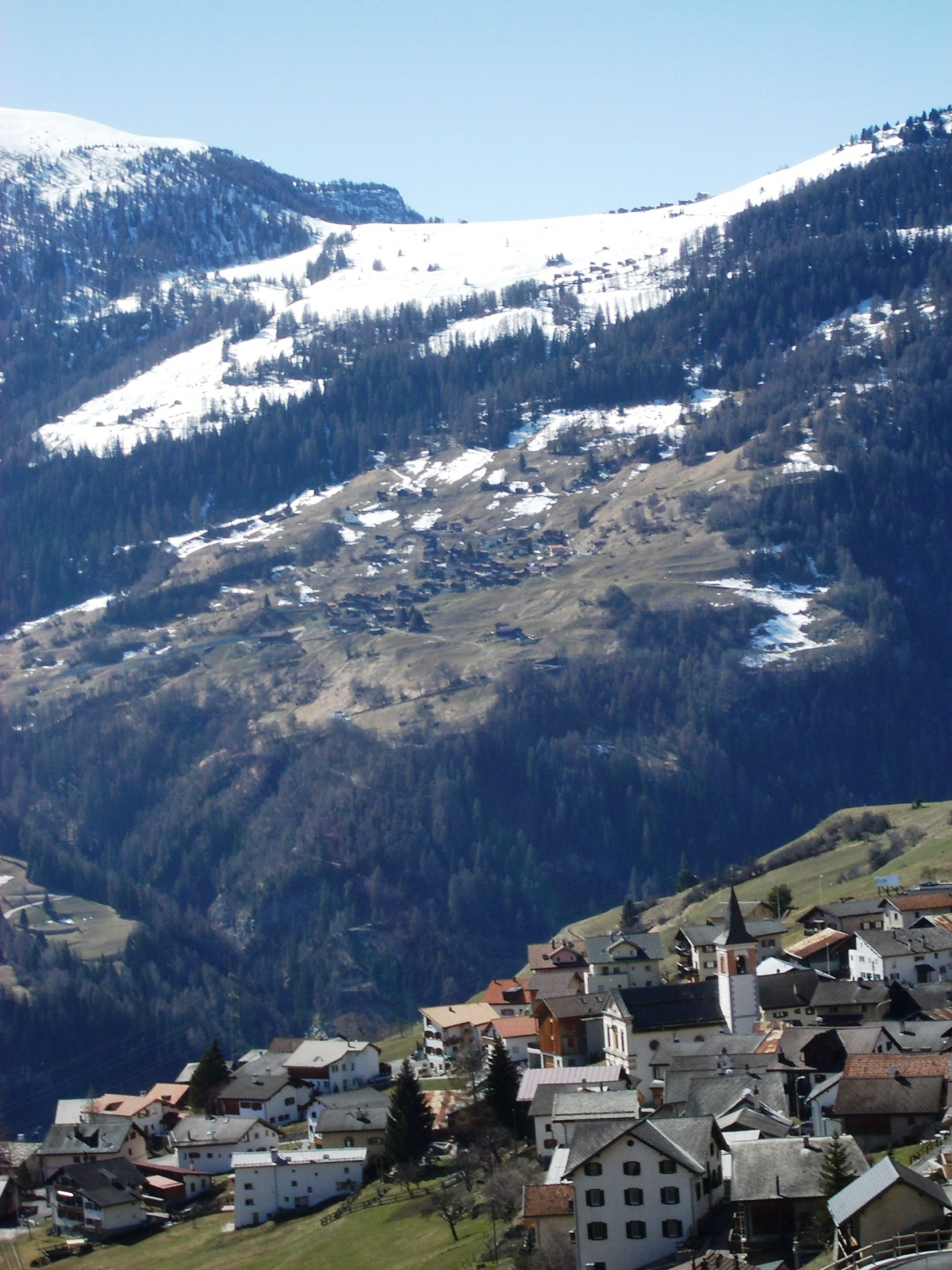

- Flag Coat of arms
- Location of Vaz/Obervaz
- Location within Switzerland Location within Canton of Graubünden
- Coordinates: 46°43′N 09°33′E
- Country: Switzerland
- Canton: Graubünden
- District: Albula

Area
  - Total: 42.45 km^{2} (16.39 sq mi)
- Elevation (Lenzerheide): 1,476 m (4,843 ft)
- Highest elevation (Parpaner Rothorn): 2,865 m (9,400 ft)
- Lowest elevation (Schin gorge): 700 m (2,300 ft)

Population (December 2020)
  - Total: 2,802
  - Density: 66.01/km^{2} (171.0/sq mi)
- Time zone: UTC+01:00 (CET)
  - Summer (DST): UTC+02:00 (CEST)
- Postal code: 7082
- SFOS number: 3506
- ISO 3166 code: CH-GR
- Localities: Lenzerheide, Valbella, Lain, Muldain, Zorten, Nivaigl, Fuso, Trantermoira, Sporz, Tgantieni, Sartons, Creusen, and Obersolis
- Surrounded by: Almens, Alvaschein, Arosa, Churwalden, Lantsch/Lenz, Mutten, Parpan, Scharans, Sils im Domleschg, Stierva, Tschiertschen
- Website: www.vazobervaz.ch

Vaz/Obervaz is a municipality in the Albula Region in the canton of Graubünden in Switzerland.

The municipality of Vaz/Obervaz includes the following villages: Lain, Muldain, Zorten, Lenzerheide, and Valbella, as well as the hamlets of Nivaigl, Fuso, Trantermoira, Sporz, Tgantieni, Sartons, Creusen and Obersolis.

== Geography ==
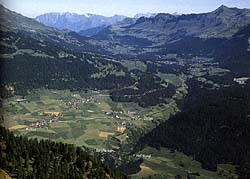
Obervaz

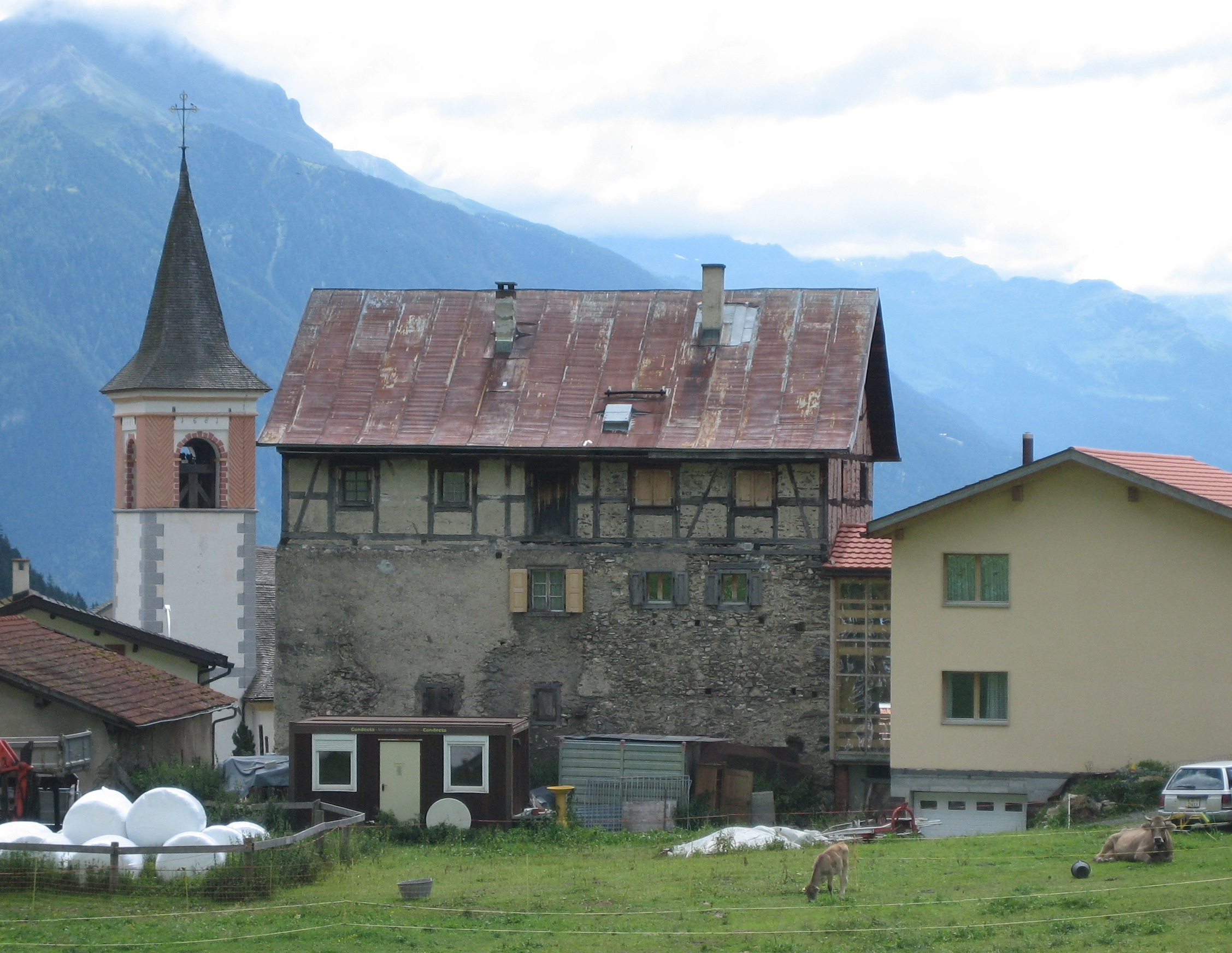
House in Muldain village

Aerial view from 500 m by Walter Mittelholzer (1925)

No town of the name Vaz/Obervaz actually exists. Commonly, Lain, Muldain and Zorten make up the Obervaz region. Until 1943 Vaz/Obervaz was known as Obervaz.

The area of Vaz/Obervaz extends from Parpan in the north to Alvaschein and Lantsch/Lenz in the south, and from the mountain chain of the Parpaner Rothorn in the east to the expansive alpine meadows of Piz Scalotta, Dani and Stätzerhorn. On the southern slope of Mount Crap la Pala, the land rises steeply up the sharply cut sides of the ravine of the Albula. Accordingly, the elevation differences within the municipality are large: from the lowest point of about 700 meters elevation in the Schin gorge, the highest point, on Mount Parpaner Rothorn, is 2865 meters in elevation. The main towns have an average elevation of 1,200 meters (3,900 ft), while the health resort of Lenzerheide has an elevation of about 1,500 meters (4,900 ft). The municipality has an area, as of 2006, of 42.5 km^{2} (16.4 sq mi), which makes Vaz/Obervaz one of the biggest municipalities in canton Graubünden. Of this area, 42% is used for agricultural purposes, while 39.4% is forested. Of the rest of the land, 6.2% is settled (buildings or roads) and the remainder (12.4%) is non-productive (rivers, glaciers or mountains).

== Population ==
Vaz/Obervaz has a population (as of 31 December 2020) of 2,802. As of 2008, 15.2% of the population was made up of foreign nationals. Over the last 10 years the population has decreased at a rate of -2.8%.

The historical population is given in the following chart:

Until 1900, the permanent population lived almost exclusively through agriculture, and the number of inhabitants remained nearly constant through the centuries.

The Jenische (a nomadic people) who called Obervaz home were mostly on trips to peddle goods, and therefore hardly influenced the population statistics. Nevertheless, the death records show, between 1892 and 1905, 115 farmers, 2 table-ware salesmen, and peddlers and one bell caster. (Source: Website of the municipal school of Vaz/Obervaz)

Even today many Jenische live in Vaz/Obervaz, for example, the Moser and Kollegger families; some even take public office. Other Jenische whose families have called Vaz/Obervaz home live spread throughout Switzerland, particularly in the cities of St. Gallen, Zürich, and Basel. Still alive, although mostly in central Switzerland, is the traditional way of life of "Vazer Jenische," in their "home-wagons".

=== Demographics ===
As of 2000, the gender distribution of the population was 50.5% male and 49.5% female. The age distribution, as of 2000, in Vaz/Obervaz is; 278 people or 10.3% of the population are between 0 and 9 years old. 148 people or 5.5% are 10 to 14, and 147 people or 5.5% are 15 to 19. Of the adult population, 387 people or 14.4% of the population are between 20 and 29 years old. 472 people or 17.5% are 30 to 39, 399 people or 14.8% are 40 to 49, and 322 people or 12.0% are 50 to 59. The senior population distribution is 264 people or 9.8% of the population are between 60 and 69 years old, 186 people or 6.9% are 70 to 79, there are 76 people or 2.8% who are 80 to 89, and there are 12 people or 0.4% who are 90 to 99.

=== Language ===
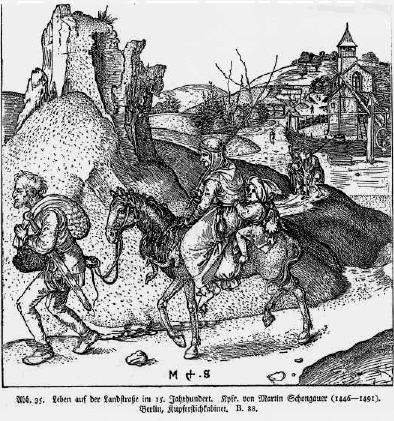
Jenishe on the road, from a 15th-century engraving

In the municipality of Vaz/Obervaz, Romansh and German are spoken. The Jenische language is heard in the village in individual expressions which have flown into the regional language. Those Jenische who live in town maintain their language only in their family circle, and in contact with those Jenische who live the traveler's life.

Most of the population (as of 2000) speaks German (82.1%), with Romansh being second most common (9.0%) and Portuguese being third (2.2%).

Language in Vaz/Obervaz
Language	Census 1980		Census 1990		Census 2000	
Language	Number	Percent	Number	Percent	Number	Percent
German	1,297	62.75%	1,728	74.77%	2,209	82.09%
Romansh	594	28.74%	368	15.92%	243	9.03%
Italian	66	3.19%	52	2.25%	49	1.82%
Population	2,067	100%	2,311	100%	2,691	100%

=== Religion ===
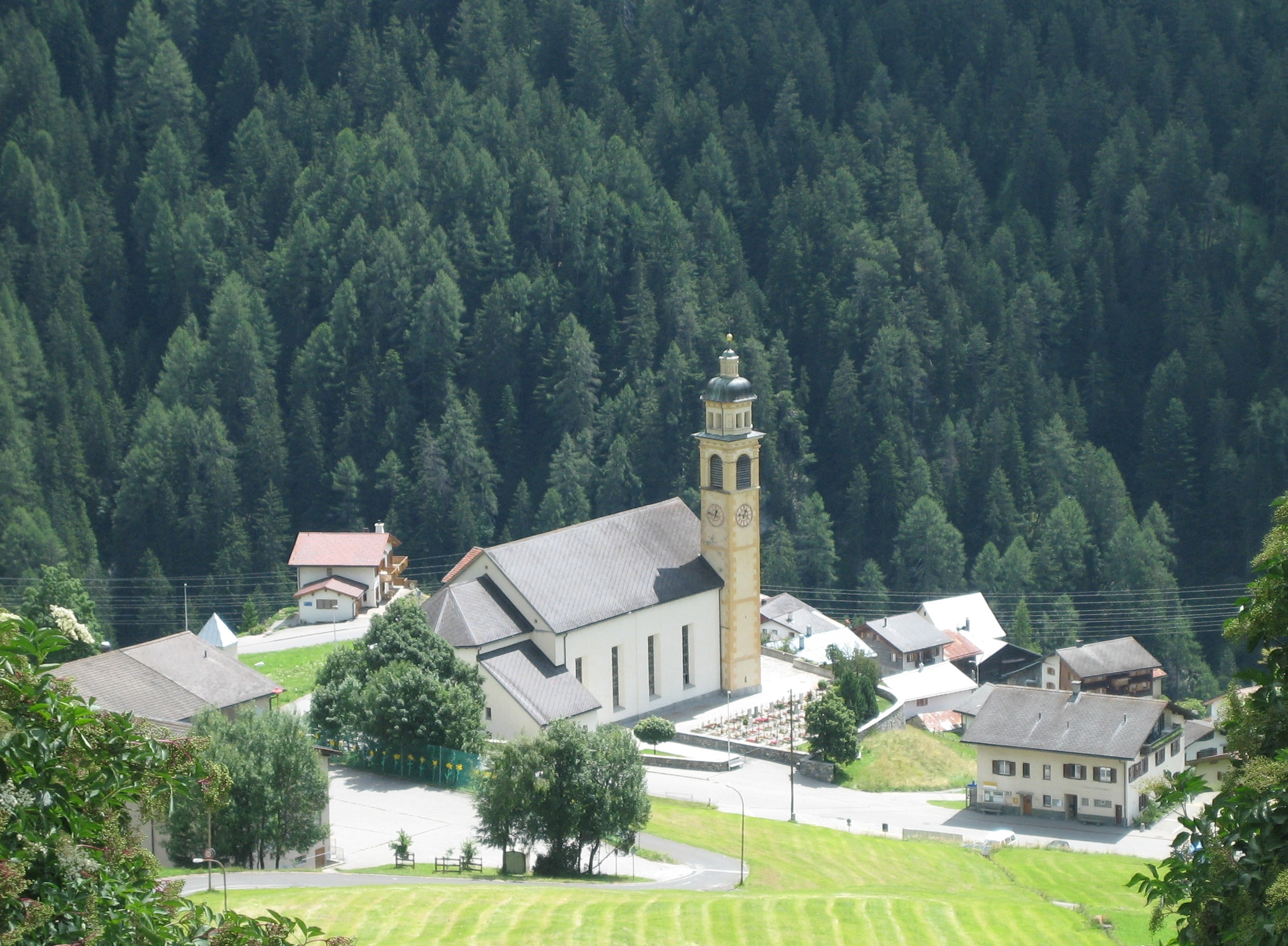
Village church of Zorten

The population of the municipality is predominantly Catholic. The Protestant church community has about 700 members. In the municipality of Obervaz there are eight Catholic churches, in addition to the Protestant church in Lenzerheide. After the Maria Goretti Church opened on July 24, 1977 in Valbella, every community in Obervaz had a church. Obersolis has a small pilgrimage church.

From the 2000 census, 1,694 or 63.0% are Roman Catholic, while 655 or 24.3% belonged to the Swiss Reformed Church. Of the rest of the population, there are 43 individuals (or about 1.60% of the population) who belong to the Orthodox Church, and there are 5 individuals (or about 0.19% of the population) who belong to another Christian church. There are 45 (or about 1.67% of the population) who are Islamic. There are 18 individuals (or about 0.67% of the population) who belong to another church (not listed on the census), 139 (or about 5.17% of the population) belong to no church, are agnostic or atheist, and 92 individuals (or about 3.42% of the population) did not answer the question.

=== Origin - nationality ===
Jenische have had citizenship in Obervaz since the 18th century. In 2002, 13.5% of the population were foreign. 2.16% claimed Portuguese as their main language in 2000, and was as such made the third official language of the municipality, after German (82.09%) and Romansh (9.03%).

=== Education ===
In Vaz/Obervaz about 69% of the population (between age 25-64) have completed either non-mandatory upper secondary education or additional higher education (either university or a Fachhochschule).

== Authorities ==
=== Legislative ===
The municipal council has 15 members. The president is elected to a one-year term. The council selects their agenda, decides on the creation of new offices, and the proclamation of generally not obligatory regulations. They approve the annual account and the budget, and set the tax rate. Further, they are responsible for obtaining permission for supplemental credits of up to 500,000 Franks and for construction projects in the municipality. They elect the Municipal Commission every three years.

=== Executive ===
The manager of the municipality is the Gemeindeexekutiv. It consists of the Municipal President and four other members. It is the Administration and Police Authority in the municipality, and selects the members of the Municipal Administration.

=== National elections ===
In the 2007 federal election the most popular party was the SVP which received 38.1% of the vote. The next three most popular parties were the CVP (29.8%), the FDP (17.4%) and the SPS (13.9%).

== Tourism ==
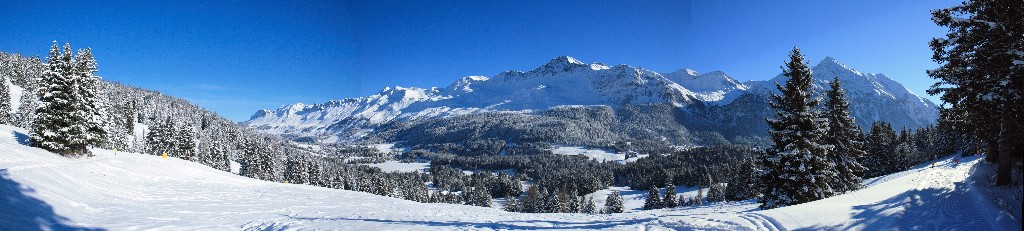
Lenzerheide ski resort panorama

The rise of skiing as a sport considerably promoted the creation of health resorts in the then recently established Lenzerheide and Valbella. The development of tourism in Engadin and Davos was a stimulus and encouragement to establish a health resort in Vaz/Obervaz. The first regular and successful ski course in Lenzerheide was finished in 1903. The beginning of tourist development was marked by the construction of a Funi track (a Funi was a mechanism by which two carriages on skids pulled each other up and down the mountain) between Val Sporz and Tgantieni in 1936. At the end of 2013 the ski resort of Lenzerheide was linked with Arosa by cable-car, creating the new ski resort of Arosa Lenzerheide. Since then transport passes work in both resorts.

== Employment ==
Vaz/Obervaz has an unemployment rate of 1.11%. As of 2005, there were 86 people employed in the primary economic sector and about 36 businesses involved in this sector. 347 people are employed in the secondary sector and there are 37 businesses in this sector. 1,327 people are employed in the tertiary sector, with 189 businesses in this sector.

== History ==
Obervaz was definitely settled by the time of the Carolingians (750-910). The inventory of the belongings of the Frankish crown in Raetia made in 831 mentions Lain, Muldain and Zorten along with their churches. Around 840 the entire region was mentioned as villa Vazzes. Excavations near the old parish church of St. Donat in Zorten discovered Roman finds, among others.

The municipality of Vaz/Obervaz was a part of the possessions of the Free Lords of Vaz. This important dynastic family definitely existed between 1135 and 1338, as can be proven with documents. Certainly, the Free Lords of Vaz were one of the most powerful aristocratic families of the Alps. From one document (from 1253) it can be inferred that they owned land in the distant German Linzgau. The Vazes received tithes from a total of 28 communities in the surroundings of Salem.

In Graubünden the Free Lords of Vaz possessed, besides their main seat, der Löwenburg (Lion Castle) in Nivagl, and later Castle Belfort, rights to 25 castles, including Neu-Aspermont in Herrschaft, Jörgenberg in Oberland, Ortstein at the entrance to the Domleschgs valley, and even one in Splügen. The two most important representatives of the dynasty were Walter IV and Donat of Vaz. Donat left two daughters, Kunigunde, who married Friedrich von Toggenburg, and Ursula, who married Rudolph von Werdenberg Sargans after the death of Donat. The inheritance of the last Free Lord was thus split between the two noble houses.

Vaz/Obervaz paid to become an independent municipality in 1456. The bishops of Chur, Schams and Obervaz bought the inheritance of Ursula from an impoverished Count Werdenberg Sargans for 3600 Gulden in 1456. Obervaz paid about 600 Gulden for its area, or about 11,000 Franks.

During the next centuries, the municipality became successively more democratic and free, only during the Thirty Years War was it shortly lead back to a condition of insecure rights, the results of which included material loss, debt, and economic ruin. The time after the war was shaped by problems of authority between political, religious and native justice, over arguments about forest usage and municipal borders. Connected to these arguments were others between the Vazers, the Churwalders, and the Parparners about the forest usage rights on Mount Stätz. When Vazers killed 12 sheep in 1487, those opposed gained great control. The area was not leased for settlement until 1788.

The biggest emergency came during the Thirty Years' War. The plague was brought into town by imperial troops. It affected large parts of Graubünden, and took the majority of the population in many valley settlements. In this way the Walser settlement of Schall behind Mount Piz Danis became completely desolate, and has since only been recently settled.

Perhaps the first Jenische obtained their citizenship in the 18th century through purchase. At that time in other towns, they had, in the best case, only the status of the lower class, or the Tolerated. Because of the pre-existing rights, during the conversion of the Swiss federal laws concerning homelessness in the middle of the 19th century, many homeless Jenische with family connections to the Obervaz Jenische were assigned Obervaz citizenship by the federal authorities.

== Culture and associations ==
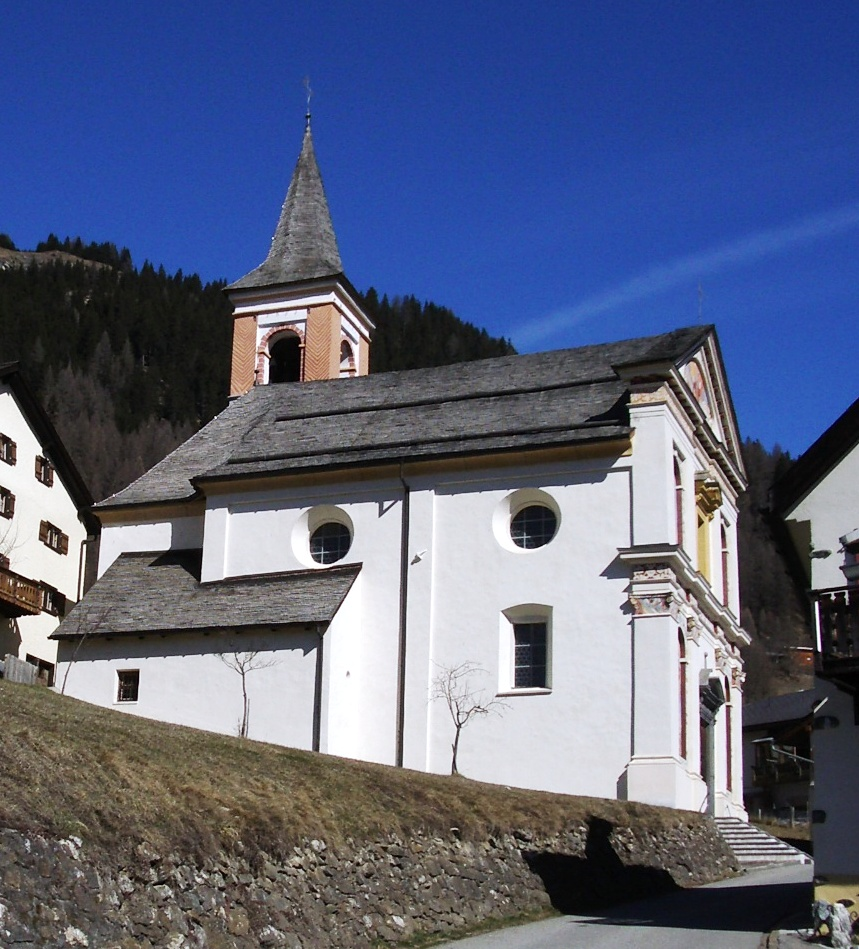
Church of S. Leza/St. Luzius in Lain

The community museum of Vaz/Obervaz is near the church in Zorten. It is open between the beginning of July and the end of October, on Thursdays, from 1:30 until 4:00 pm. The old parsonage in Zorten was converted into the museum in the early 1980s. The goal of the municipality was to exhibit old, valuable exhibits that show how the lives of the inhabitants were shaped, or have historical value. The collection includes items used for agriculture, examples of early crafts, diverse items from village life, sacred pieces from the local churches, a model of the village mill, the history of the Free Lords of Vaz, and sculptures of Ferdinand Parpan. It also shows visitors how modern sports have developed, and, through a collection of posters and postcards, how a quiet valley was transformed into a modern tourist region.

=== Heritage sites of national significance ===
The Church of S. Leza/St. Luzius and the house of Tgea Kessler Nr. 65 are listed as Swiss heritage sites of national significance. The Church of St. Luzius in Lain was first mentioned in 1508. It was totally rebuilt in 1678-80 and restored in 1962.
