= Kurhaus Bergün =

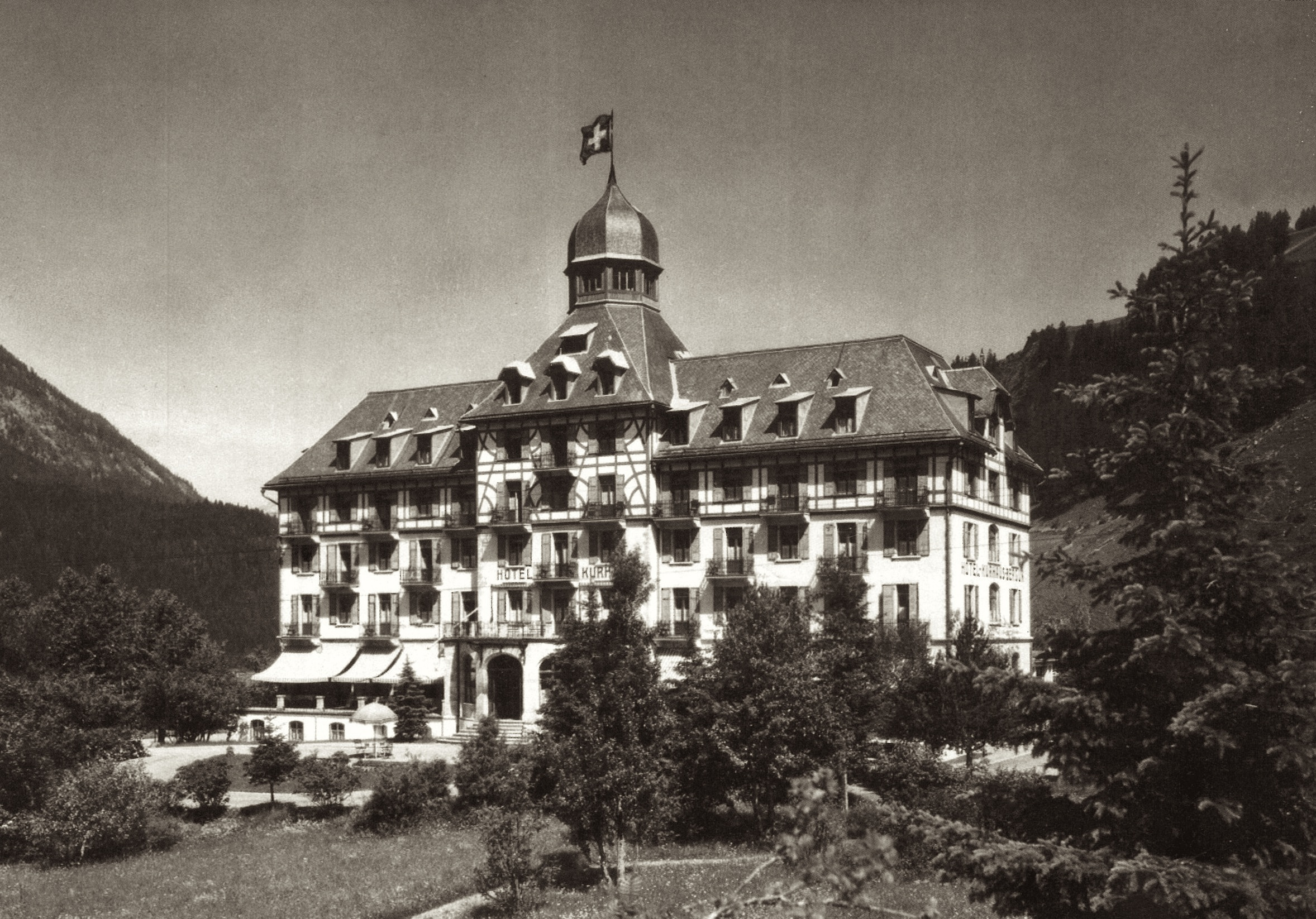

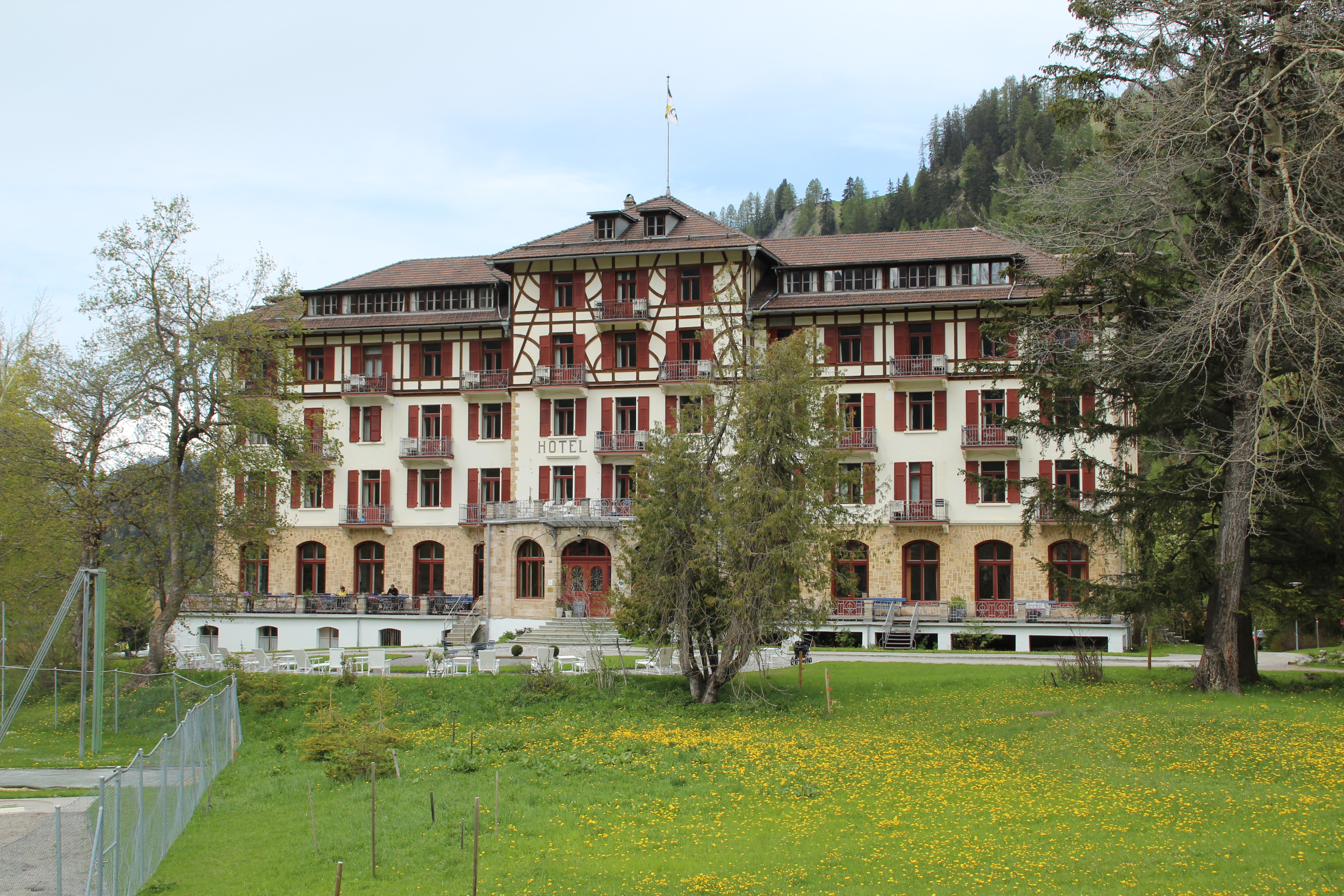
- Kurhaus Bergün from the south (c. 1920 & 2012)

- Location within Switzerland

General information
- Location: Bergün/Bravuogn, Grisons, Switzerland
- Coordinates: 46°37′44.9″N 9°44′53.7″E
- Opening: 1906

Design and construction
- Architect: Jost-Franz Huwyler-Boller (1874–1930)

Website
- Official site

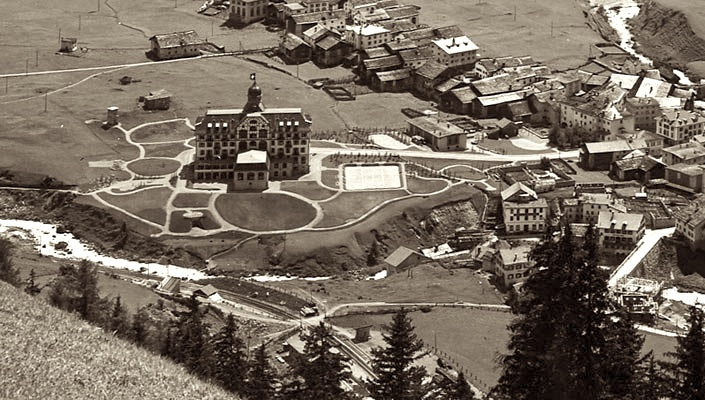
The Kurhaus when new, viewed from the north (1906)

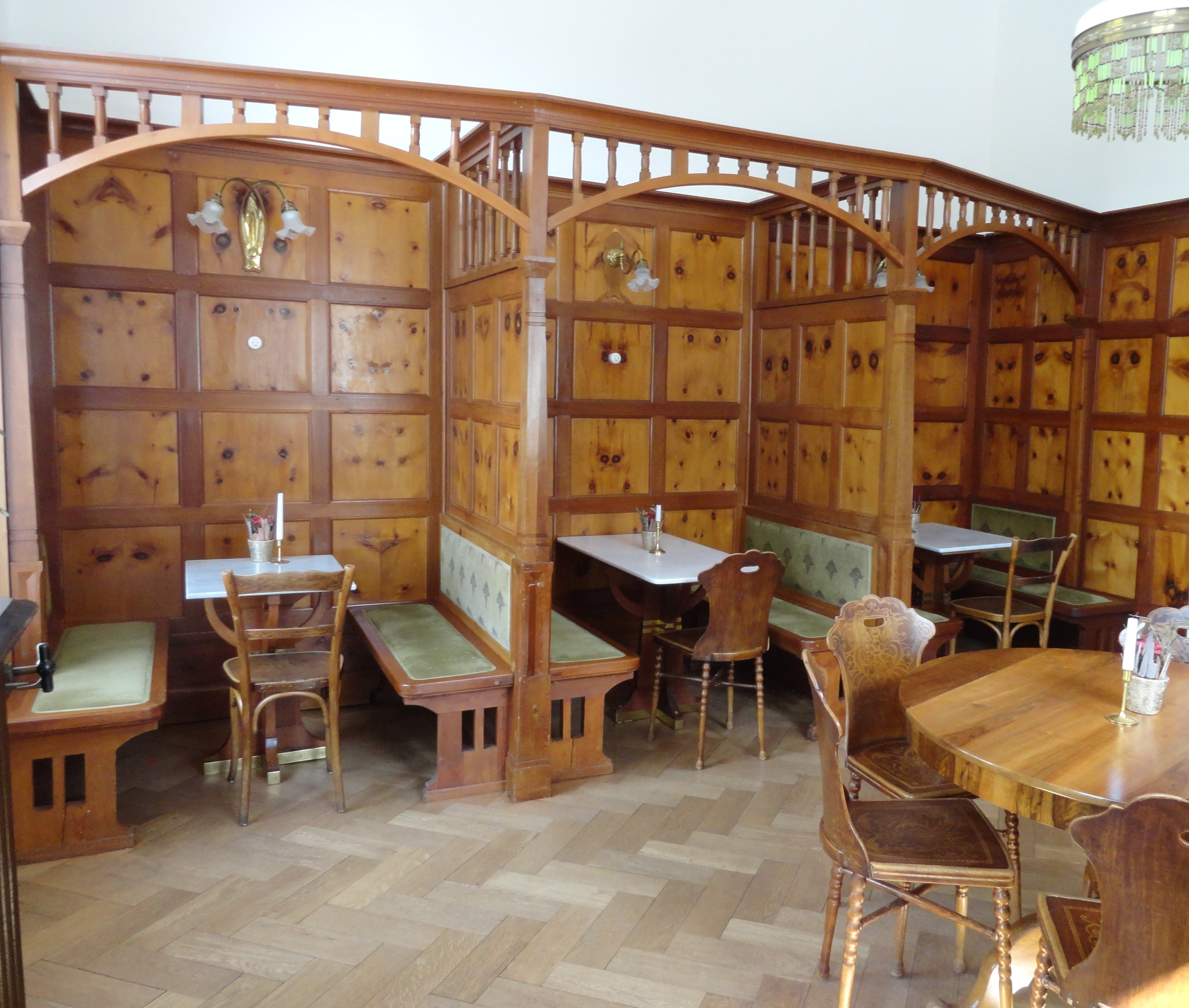
The Kurhaus bar (2012)

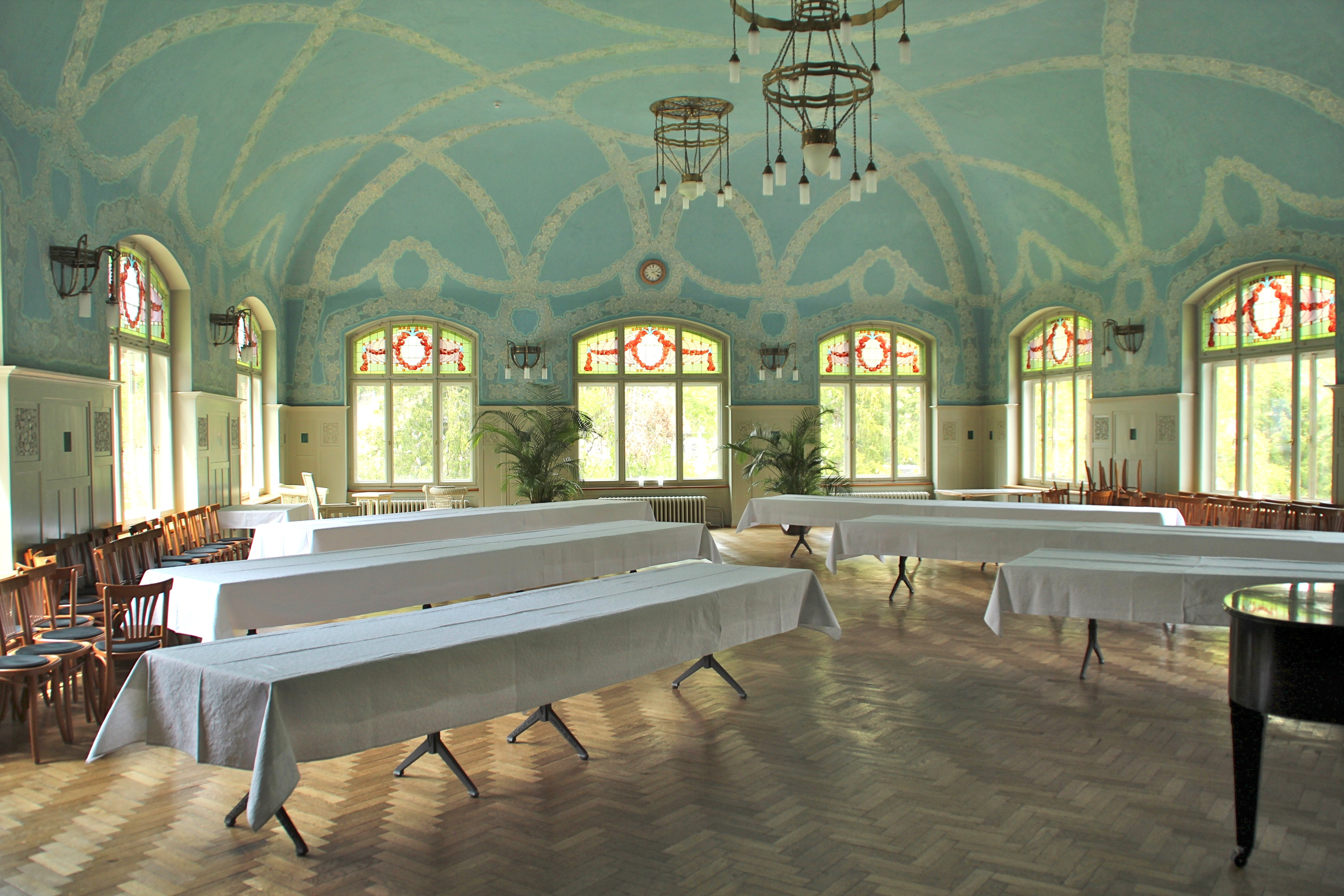
The Kurhaus dining room (2012)

The Kurhaus Bergün, located in the village of Bergün/Bravuogn in the Albula valley, south of Chur and north of St. Moritz, at an altitude of approximately 1,350 metres (4,429 ft) above mean sea level, is a well preserved/restored hotel of the Jugendstil (Art Nouveau) era. It was built as a grand hotel, opening in 1906.

== History ==
=== Early years ===
After the construction of a road, following the river downstream to Filisur in 1855–58, the opening of the stunning Albula Railway in 1903 ushered in a second burst of development for Bergün, and an "initiative committee" started planning for the construction of a hotel in the village. Design was entrusted to the Zürich architect Jost-Franz Huwyler-Boller (1874–1930) who also worked on the Hotel Cresta Palace in Celerina at about the same time.

The hotel opened to guests in the Spring of 1906, offering 120 beds in 85 rooms. It was hoped that Bergün's altitude and remote location would make it attractive as an acclimatisation location for guests preparing to stay higher up in the Engadin and as a health resort in its own right, based on the air quality. The hotel was able to advertise luxury features such as central heating, electric lighting, a lift/elevator, a bathroom, a large dining room, several large south-facing terraces, an elegant vestibule and a ladies' room. Entertainment facilities included a bar, a billiards room, a reading and writing room along with a darkened room "Dunkelkammer". Modern baths and wcs had been delivered by train direct from England and installed by the manufacturer's own technicians.

In 1911 the Kurhaus opened for its first winter season, once the firm "Oberrauch" of Davos had fitted a hot-water distributed central heating system. The winter season lasted till March. During that first winter season a room with two beds cost 7.00 francs, an evening meal 6.00 per person and breakfast 1.50 francs. A winter attraction of the resort, which had already been opened for the 1904/05 season, was a large skating rink in front of the hotel, used for simple skating, for ice-hockey and for curling.

The wider development of Bergün/Bravuogn as a tourist destination that had been anticipated in 1906 never materialised: the Kurhaus has remained the only substantial hotel in the village. The spectacular Albula Railway did indeed provide, for the first time, a reliable year-round transport connection towards Chur, but it also enabled the well-heeled to travel directly to higher and better promoted resorts further south in Grisons, notably St. Moritz and Pontresina, without needing to pause at Bergün/Bravuogn Despite bitter resistance from some of the canton's conservative elements, the ban on private motor car usage was grudgingly lifted in the mid-1920s, and during the ensuing decades the more prosperous guests for whom the hotel had been designed increasingly used cars, which highlighted the fact that the village had never acquired reliable year-round road links, especially upriver, to the south. The Kurhaus had come on-stream in 1906 with substantial debts, set in one source at an initial level of 73,000 Francs, and revenues never justified the size of the initial investment.

=== Austerity years and a move downmarket ===
Following a major fire on the top floor on 9 August 1949 the hotel was closed. A slow reconstruction followed, whereby although the original architecture was for most purposes respected, the flamboyant little tower which had topped off the building in 1906 was not reinstated. However, potential capacity was instead increased as the original line of roof-dormers was replaced with a more substantial fourth floor. The municipality purchased the hotel and refitted it in a less exuberant style before selling it on to the "Swiss Association for Family Hostels" ("Schweizerische Verein für Familienherbergen"), which from 1952 operated it as self-catering holiday accommodation for families. A large number of internal partitions were added as the previously large hotel rooms were batched into groups of two or three and reconfigured as 34 holiday apartments, each with its own little kitchen and rented out on a weekly basis. Most of ground floor facilities such as the restaurants, the bar, the reading and writing room and the billiard room were converted into apartments. The principal dining room and cinema were adapted to be used for group presentations and for teaching school classes. A Saving grace was that the original walls and ceilings were not replaced. They were left in place and covered with timber "inner" skins which in many places had the effect of preserving them, probably in better condition than if they had been left exposed. Nevertheless, during the 50 years from 1952 till 2002 basic building maintenance was neglected. Exposed facades began to crumble and the roof ceased to be entirely water-proof.

=== 21st century ===
In 2002 a group of the former regular guests teamed up to form the company "Kurhaus Bergün AG" and in the same year succeeded in buying the hotel for 1.5 Million Swiss francs. Under the direction of an architect from Sissach called Heini Dalcher the building was lovingly restored over a period of several years. The hotel was in most respects structurally sound, and most of the original walls and ceilings were in most places well protected by panels placed over them in the conversion work of the 1950s. A lot of the old furniture was found in the roof loft where it had stood untouched for half a century.

Work started on returning the ground floor rooms to their original condition. The 230m² dining room with its original windows and rehabilitated wall coverings and light fittings is described as one of the most precious Jugendstil (Art Nouveau) interiors in Switzerland. In 2010 the bar came back into operation with its original "seating booths", along with the cinema room. Work has also progressed reinstating and restoring the bedrooms: those on the first, second and third floors now have modern en suite bathrooms, though less expensive rooms on the fourth floor with access to shared shower and wc facilities are still available. The original wall paintings had been covered over with white paint and are initially visible only in small carefully exposed "windows" in the coating. The old Rattan furnishings are being recreated by a family firm in Viet Nam, using the original specifications.

In 2009 the Kurhaus Bergün joined the "Swiss-Historic-Hotels" marketing co-operative, of which the hotel's director, Christof Steiner, is currently (2015) president.

In 2021 Kurhaus Bergün – Der Traum vom Grand Hotel was published, a comprehensive investigation of the history of the Kurhaus since its construction 1904–1906.

== See also ==
- List of hotels in Switzerland
- Tourism in Switzerland

== Literature ==
- Roland Flückiger-Seiler, Kurhaus Bergün, Historisches Hotel des Jahres 2012, Bergün/Bravuogn 2012.
- Giaco Schiesser (Ed.), Kurhaus Bergün–Der Traum vom Grand Hotel. Authors: Roland Flückiger-Seiler, Corina Lanfranchi, Ralph Feiner (photographies), Zürich, Hier und Jetzt 2021. ISBN 978-3-03919-526-8
