= Bergün Filisur =

- Municipality
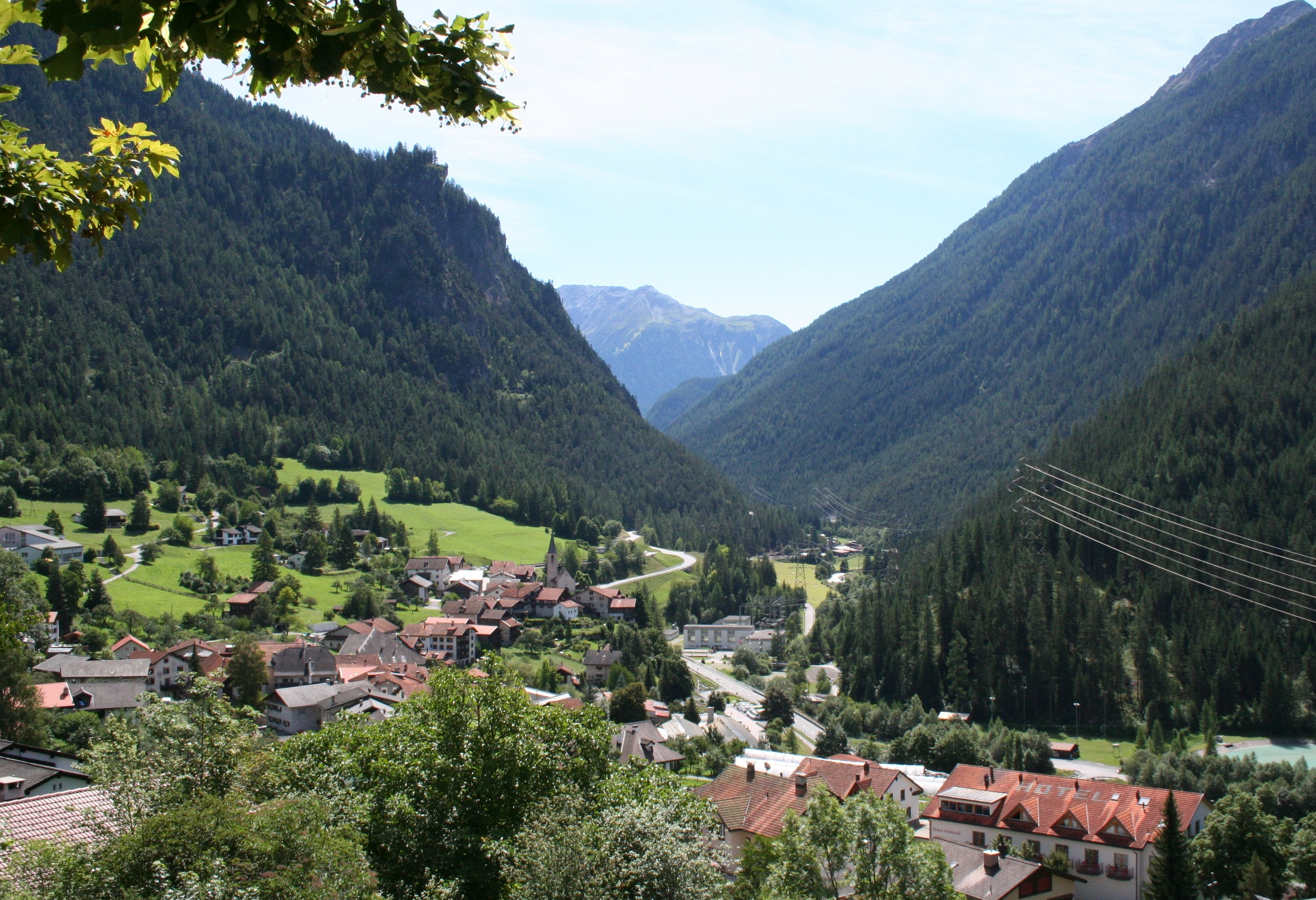
- View of Filisur looking southeast, upwards towards the Albula Pass

- Flag Coat of arms
- Location of Bergün Filisur
- Location within Switzerland Location within Canton of Graubünden
- Coordinates: 46°40′N 9°41′E
- Country: Switzerland
- Canton: Graubünden
- District: Albula

Area
  - Total: 190.14 km^{2} (73.41 sq mi)

Population (December 2020)
  - Total: 7,050
  - Density: 37.1/km^{2} (96.0/sq mi)
- Time zone: UTC+01:00 (CET)
  - Summer (DST): UTC+02:00 (CEST)
- Postal code: 7477, 82
- SFOS number: 3544
- ISO 3166 code: CH-GR
- Surrounded by: Alvaneu, Savognin, Schmitten, Tiefencastel, Tinizong-Rona, Davos
- Website: https://www.berguenfilisur.ch/ SFSO statistics

Bergün Filisur (Romansh: Bravuogn Filisur) is a municipality in the Albula Region in the canton of Graubünden in Switzerland. On 1 January 2018 the former municipalities of Bergün/Bravuogn and Filisur merged to form the new municipality of Bergün Filisur.

== History ==
=== Bergün ===
Bergün/Bravuogn is first mentioned in 1209 as de Bregonio.

=== Filisur ===
Filisur is first mentioned in 1262 as villa Fallisour.

== Geography ==
Aerial view (1954)

After the merger, Bergün Filisur has an area, as of 2009, of 190.14 km^{2} (73.41 sq mi).

== Population ==
The new municipality has a population (as of December 2020) of 7,050.

== Historic Population ==
The historical population is given in the following chart. During construction of the Rhaetian Railway line the population of both communities increased significantly.

== Weather ==
Filisur has an average of 107.7 days of precipitation per year and on average receives 915 mm (36.0 in) of it. The wettest month is August during which time Filisur receives an average of 123 mm (4.8 in) of precipitation. During this month there is precipitation for an average of 11.7 days. The driest month of the year is February with an average of 40.4 mm (1.59 in) of precipitation over 6.5 days.

== Heritage sites of national significance ==
The municipal church and the Chasa Jenatsch with its barn in Bergün and the castle ruins of Greifenstein and the Schmittentobel-Landwasser Viaduct of the Rhaetian Railway in Filisur are listed as Swiss heritage sites of national significance. The villages and hamlets of Bravuogn, Latsch, Stugl and Filisur are part of the Inventory of Swiss Heritage Sites.

The Albula Railway became a UNESCO World Heritage Site itself in 2008. It maintains the Bahnmuseum Albula at the Bergün train station. This railway museum documents the construction of the Albula line. Both former municipalities contain track of the Albula Railway

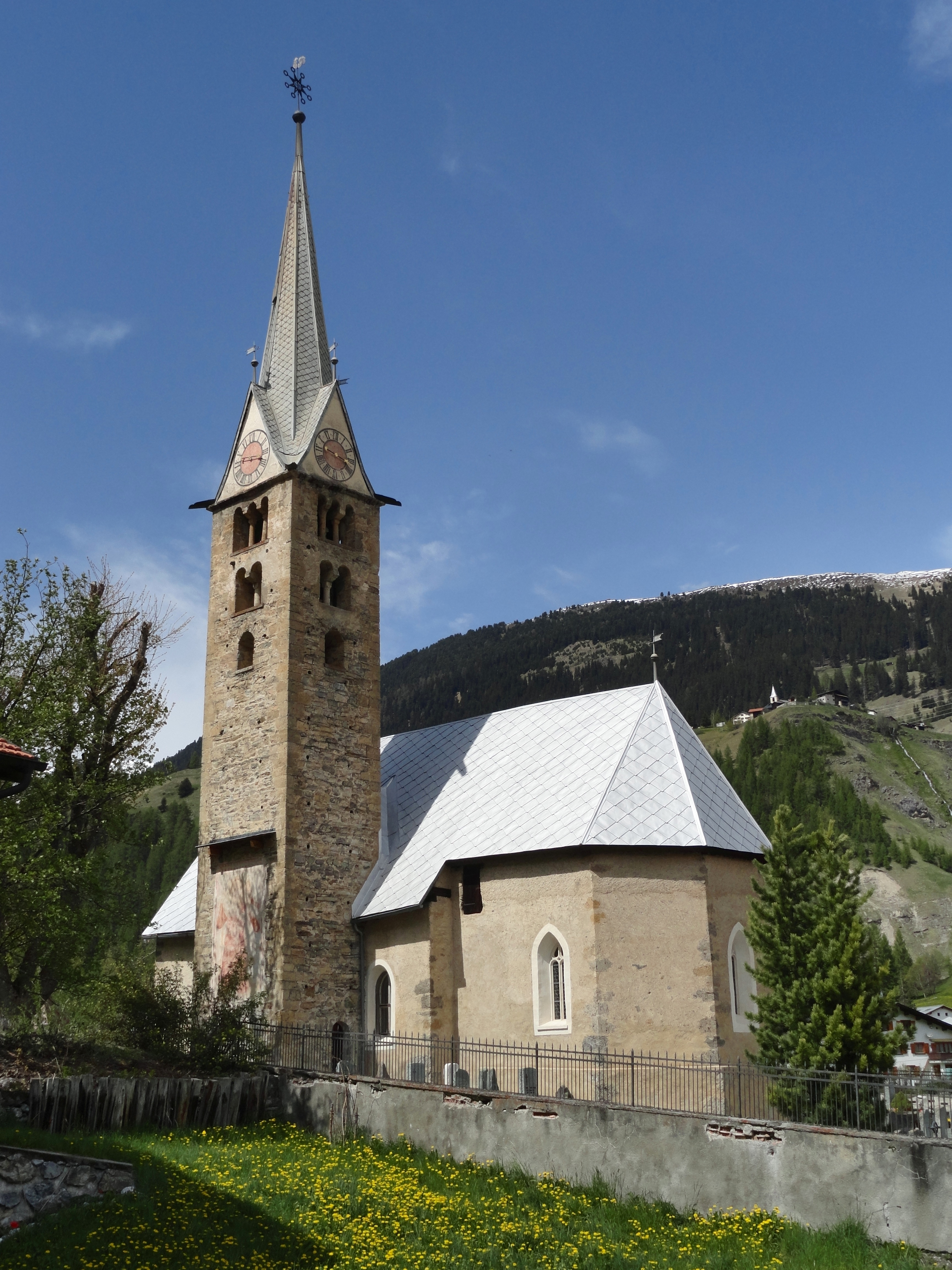
Bergün village church

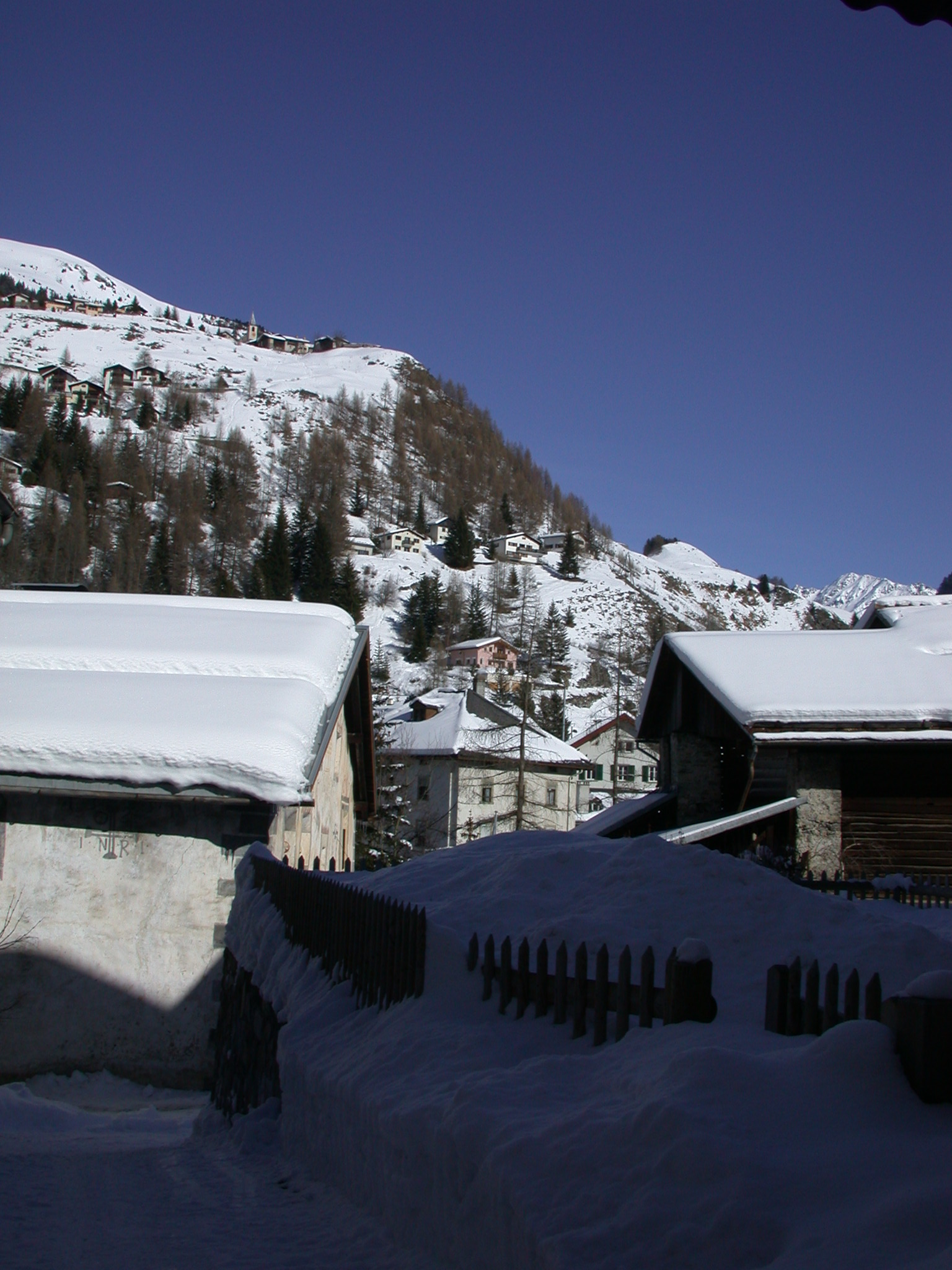
Chasa Jenatsch and barn

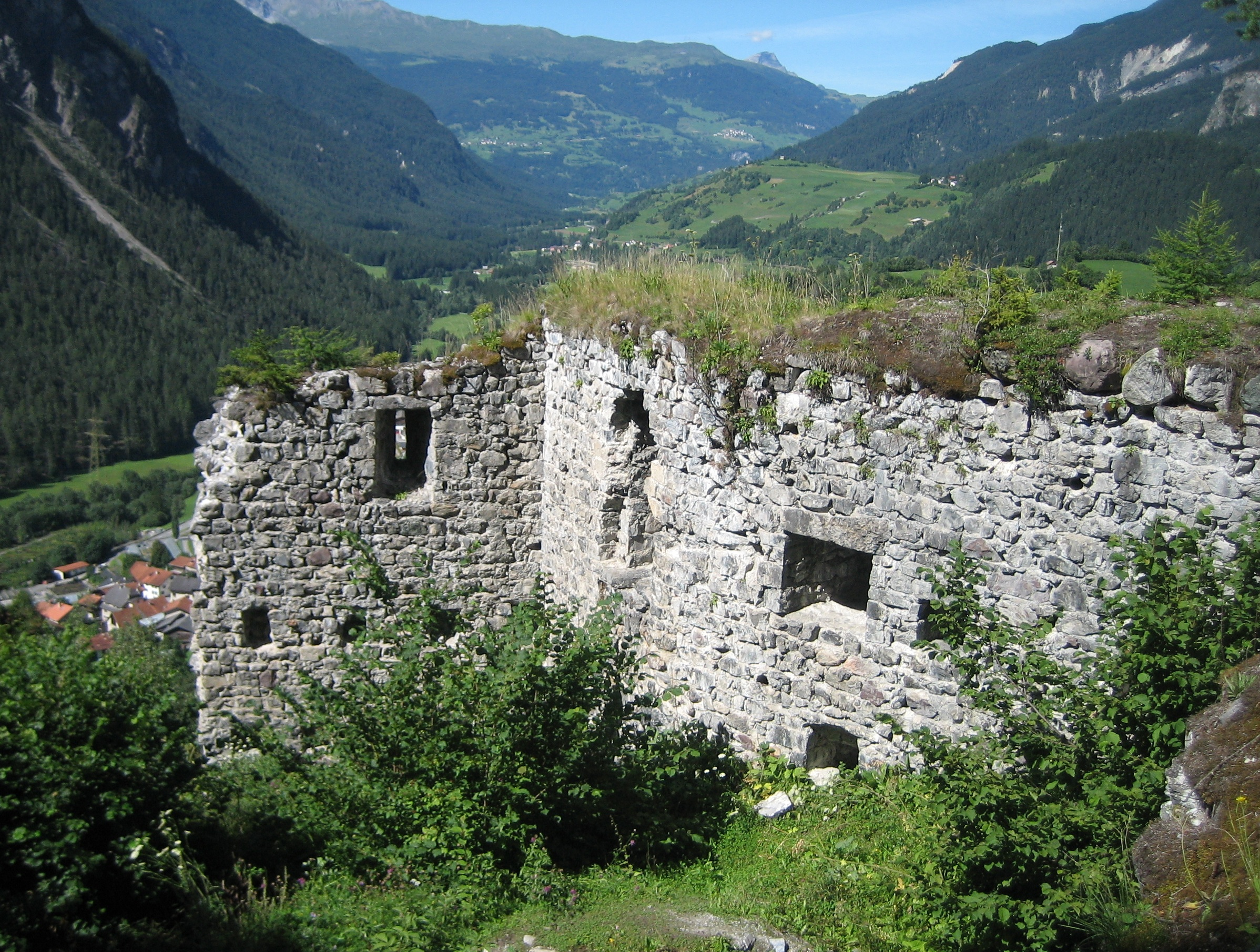
Ruins of Greifenstein Castle

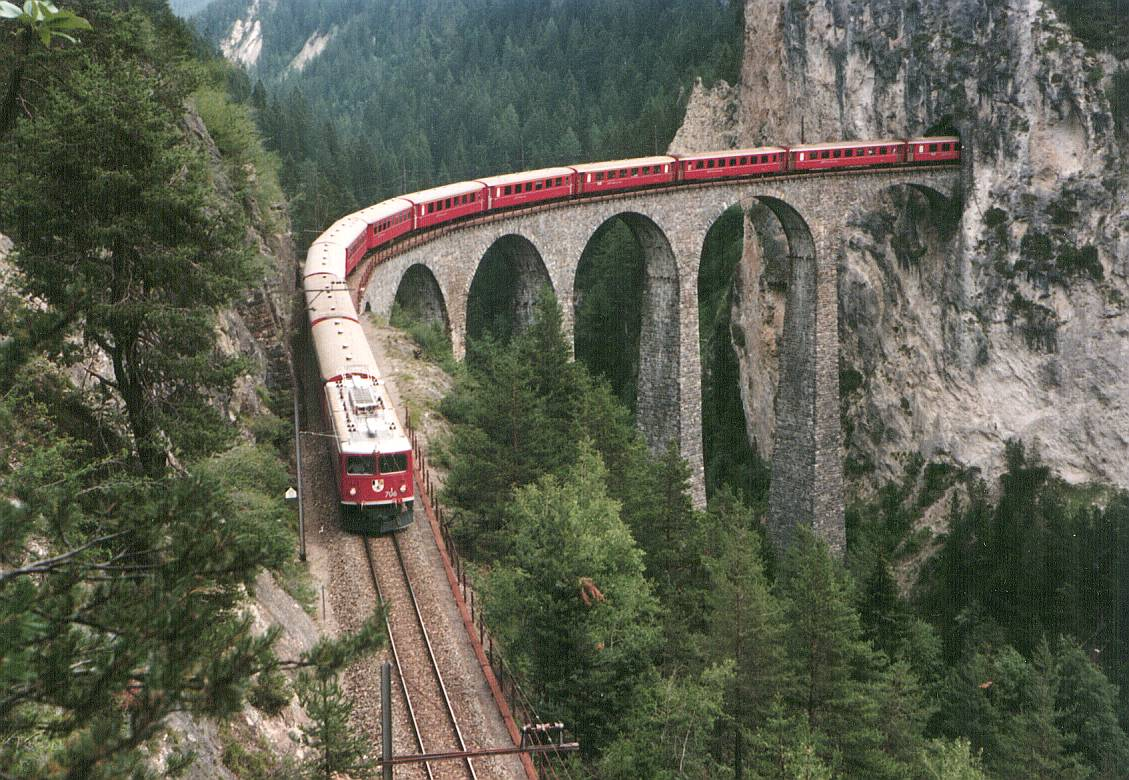
Landwasser Viaduct, 65 m (213 ft) high and 136 m (446 ft) long, built in 1902

== Transportation ==
The municipality has three railway stations: Preda, Bergün/Bravuogn, and Filisur. All three are located on the Albula line with regular service to St. Moritz and Chur. Filisur, at the junction with the Davos Platz–Filisur line, also has regular service to Davos Platz.
