= Davos Wiesen =

- Former municipality
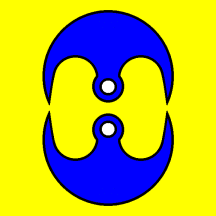
- Flag Coat of arms
- Location of Davos Wiesen
- Location within Switzerland Location within Canton of Graubünden
- Coordinates: 46°42′N 9°43′E
- Country: Switzerland
- Canton: Graubünden
- District: Davos/Prättigau

Area
  - Total: 29.49 km^{2} (11.39 sq mi)
- Elevation (Reformierte Kirche Davos Wiesen): 1,421 m (4,662 ft)

Population (December 2004)
  - Total: 327
  - Density: 11.1/km^{2} (28.7/sq mi)
- Time zone: UTC+01:00 (CET)
  - Summer (DST): UTC+02:00 (CEST)
- Postal code: 7494
- SFOS number: 3523
- ISO 3166 code: CH-GR
- Surrounded by: Arosa, Stugl/Stuls, Davos Glaris, Davos Monstein, Filisur, Schmitten
- Website: www.davoswiesen.ch

Davos Wiesen (local Walser: an de Wise [an d̥ə ˈʋɪʒ̊ə]; Romansh: Tain) is a village and a former fractional municipality. Since 2009, it is part of the municipality of Davos.
