= Lai da Ravais-ch =

Lake in the Grisons, Switzerland

- Location within Canton of Graubünden Location within Switzerland Location within Italy Location within Alps
- Interactive map of Lai da Ravais-ch
- Location: Graubünden
- Coordinates: 46°40′49″N 9°52′07″E
- Primary outflows: Ava da Ravais-ch
- Basin countries: Switzerland
- Surface area: 9.3 ha (23 acres)
- Surface elevation: 2,505 m (8,219 ft)

The Lai da Ravais-ch is an Alpine lake located south of the Sertig Pass and west of the Sella da Ravais-ch, in the Swiss canton of Graubünden. The lake has an area of 0.093 km² and is located at 2,505 metres above sea level. It is located in the municipality of Bergün Filisur.

The lake is also named Lai da Ravais-ch Suot to distinguish it from a smaller lake located east of the Sella da Ravais-ch and named Lai da Ravais-ch Sur.

== See also ==
- List of mountain lakes of Switzerland
