= Albula Region =

Coordinates: 46.6619°N 9.5756°E

Albula Region Region Albula (German) Regiun Alvra (Romansh)
- District
- Country: Switzerland
- Canton: Graubünden

Area
  - Total: 683.51 km^{2} (263.90 sq mi)

Population (2020)
  - Total: 8,175
  - Density: 11.96/km^{2} (30.98/sq mi)
- Time zone: UTC+1 (CET)
  - Summer (DST): UTC+2 (CEST)
- Municipalities: 6

Albula Region is one of the eleven administrative districts in the canton of Graubünden in Switzerland. It has an area of 683.51 square kilometers (263.90 sq mi) and a population of 8,175 (as of 31 December 2020). It was created on 1 January 2017 as part of a reorganization of the Canton.

Municipalities in the Albula Region
Municipality	Population (31 December 2020)	Area (km^{2})
Albula/Alvra	1,295	93.93
Bergün Filisur	7,050	190.14
Lantsch/Lenz	560	21.81
Schmitten (GR)	222	11.35
Surses	2,377	323.77
Vaz/Obervaz	2,802	42.51

== Mergers ==
- On 1 January 2018 the former municipalities of Bergün/Bravuogn and Filisur merged into the new municipality of Bergün Filisur.
