= Crap la Pala =

Mountain in Switzerland

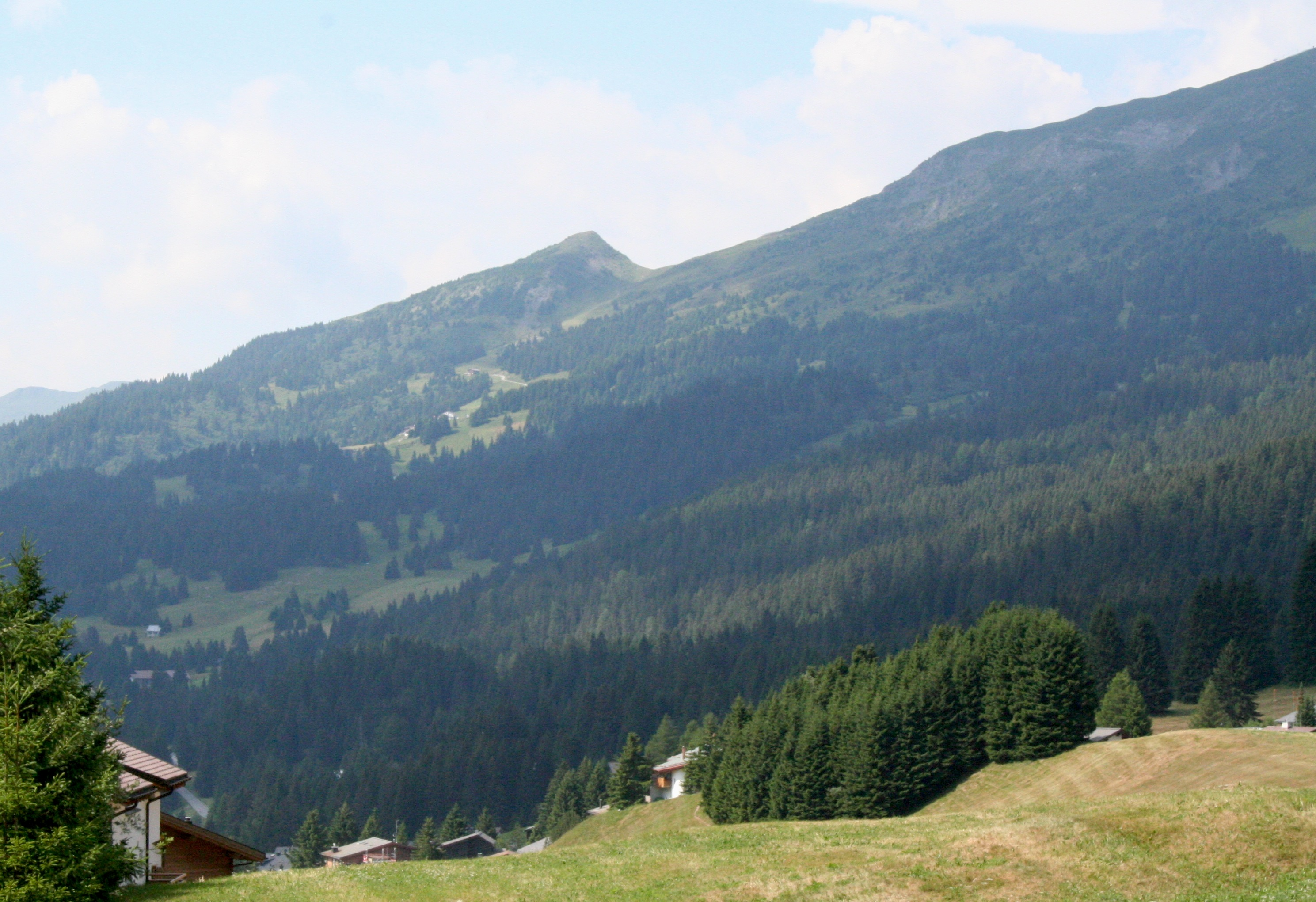

Highest point
- Elevation: 2,151 m (7,057 ft)
- Coordinates: 46°42.70′N 9°30.98′E

Geography
- Location: Graubünden, Switzerland

Crap la Pala (2,151 m) is a subpeak in the Lenzerheide region in the Swiss Alps. It lies in the southern face of Piz Scalottas, reaching a prominence of no more than 50 metres.
