= Greifenstein Castle =

Ruined castle in Switzerland

Burg Greifenstein
- Filisur
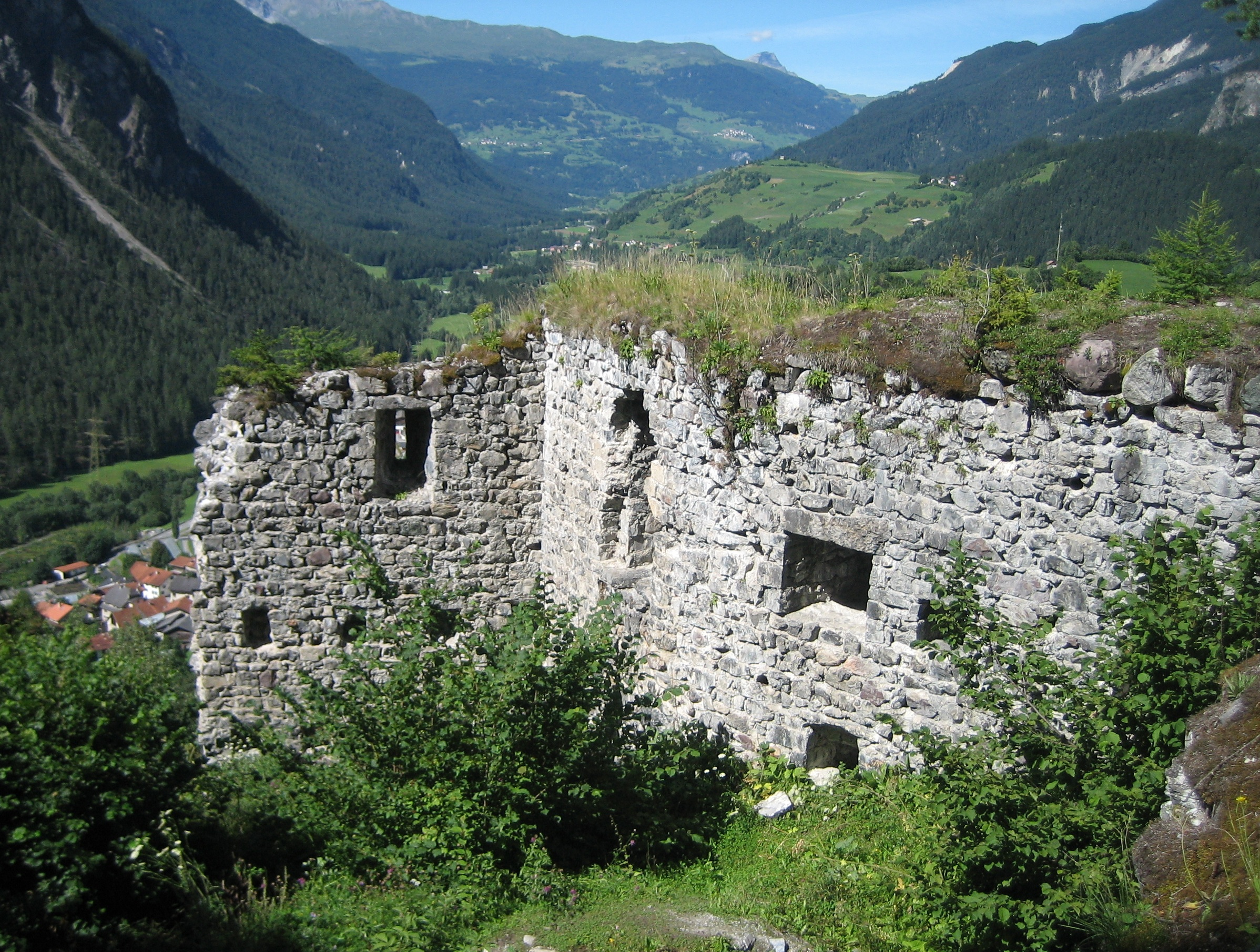
- Greifenstein Castle

Site information
- Type: hill castle
- Code: CH-GR
- Condition: ruin

Location
- Coordinates: 46°40′34″N 9°41′35.41″E
- Height: 1,246 m above the sea

Site history
- Built: 12th century

Swiss Cultural Property of National Significance

Greifenstein Castle is a ruined castle in the municipality of Filisur of the Canton of Graubünden in Switzerland. It is included on the register of the Swiss Inventory of Cultural Property of National and Regional Significance.

== History ==
The castle was built on a rocky outcropping above the village probably in the 12th century as the home of the Greifenstein family. They were probably related to the Wildenberg-Sagogn and Frauenberg in Ruschein families. The first mention of them was in 1233 as Grifenstein when Rudolf von Greifenstein was ordered by the Pope to go on a crusade as penance for murdering Bishop Berthold von Helfenstein. In 1237, he finally left to join the Crusades. In 1243, his relatives Heinrich and Albert were listed as witnesses in a legal proceeding as Hainricus et Albertus de Grifinstain.

By the late 13th century the family disappears from the record and in 1300 the Wildenberg family owns the castle and surrounding lands. Whether the Greifensteins died out or if the Wildenbergs married into the family or were a branch of the family is unclear. In 1320 Count Hugo III von Werdenberg-Heiligenberg / von Wildenberg and his wife Anna von Wildenberg mortgaged the castle and lands to the Bishop of Chur for 1150 Marks. However, three years later, in 1323 the Wildenbergs defeated the Bishop's army near Greifenstein, but by 1339 the Freiherr von Marmels ruled over the herrschaft for the Bishop. In 1360 the Freiherr von Wildenberg-Sagogn sold it to the Freiherr von Matsch.

By 1392 the von Matsch family were robber knights who used the castle as a base for raids against the Bishop's estates. In 1394 Bishop Hartmann II successfully sent an army to drive out the robbers and take control of the castle. He appointed a vogt to administer the castle and lands for him, but was forced to mortgage it to the Marmels family in 1411. The Matsch family began raiding and sued the Bishop to return the castle to them. In 1421 Duke Ernst of Austria negotiated a compromise where by the Bishop kept both Greifenstein and Tschanüff Castles but had to pay the Matsch family 2,500 Marks.

In 1468 Greifenstein, along with several other of the Bishop's castles, were attacked and occupied by the League of God's House. The castles were returned to the Bishop following intervention by the city of Zurich. In 1537 Filisur bought the rights to rule themselves from the Bishop and the castle lost its importance. It was abandoned and rapidly fell into ruin. In 1550 it was mentioned as being mostly destroyed. However, the roof remained in good repair until about 1840. When the roof finally collapsed, part of the castle was broken up for stone for the new school house in Filisur.

== Castle site ==
The castle consists of three separate parts built on terraces at differing elevations. The lower gate was built in a rocky gap at the foot of the outcropping. The entrance and parts of the surrounding wall are still visible. The lower castle once stood west of the lower gate. However, no traces remain of the wall that protected it on the valley side.

The middle castle occupies a triangular terrace north and above the lower castle. A gate guarded the narrow southern end of the triangle. Today the only trace of this gate is channel carved in the rock that probably allowed the gate to be barred. Much of the massive curtain wall that surrounded the middle castle is still standing on the north and western sides of the terrace. The vestibule and a small altar from the castle chapel are still visible along the north wall. Additionally, the middle castle cistern and rock channels that carried water to it are near the chapel.

A narrow pathway, carved into the rock, leads from the middle castle to the upper castle, a vertical climb of about 30 m (98 ft). The upper castle was an uneven hexagon tower of about 9 m × 16 m (30 ft × 52 ft). Today, only the foundation of this wall remains.

== Gallery ==
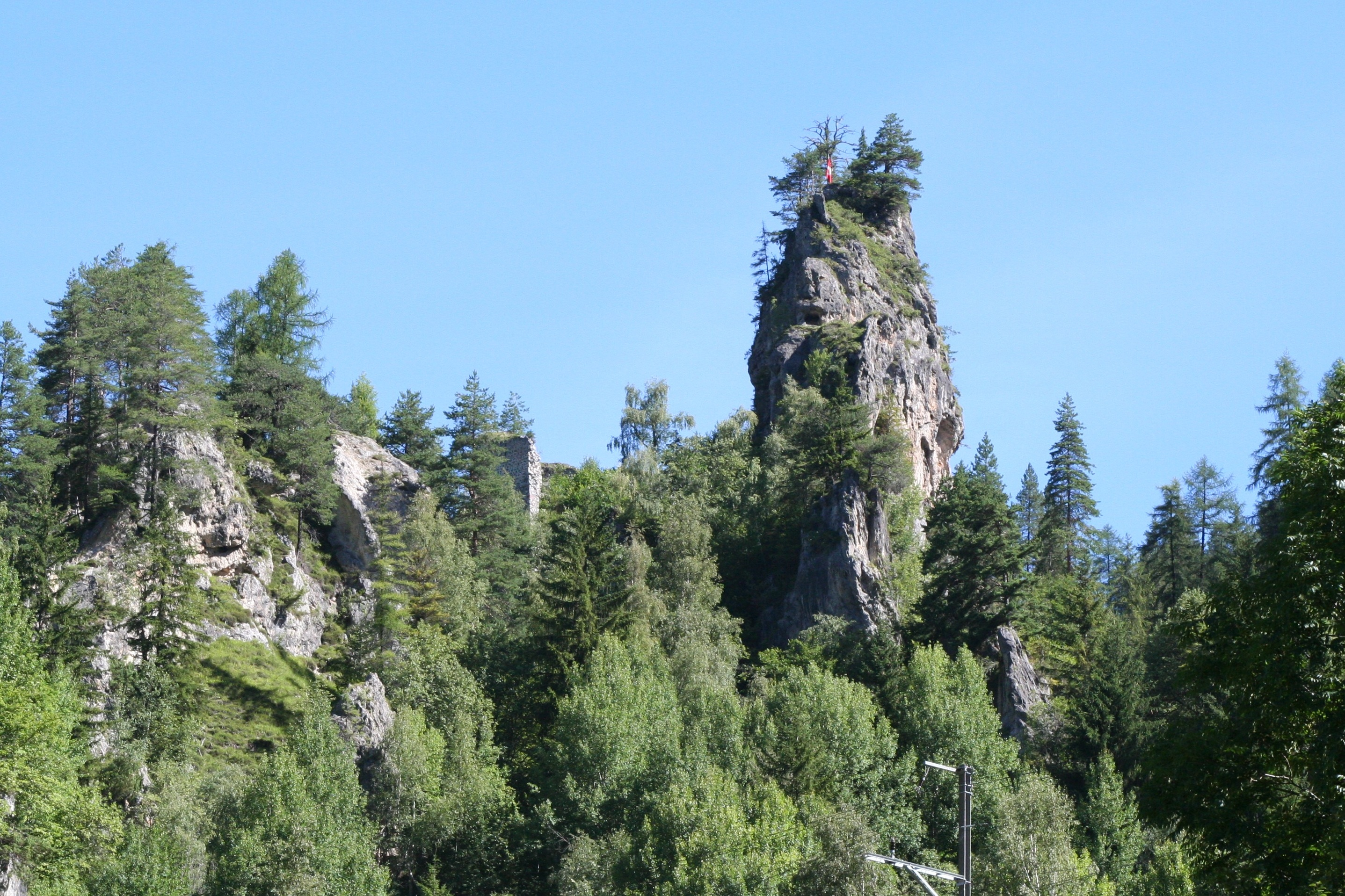
The rocky outcropping above the village

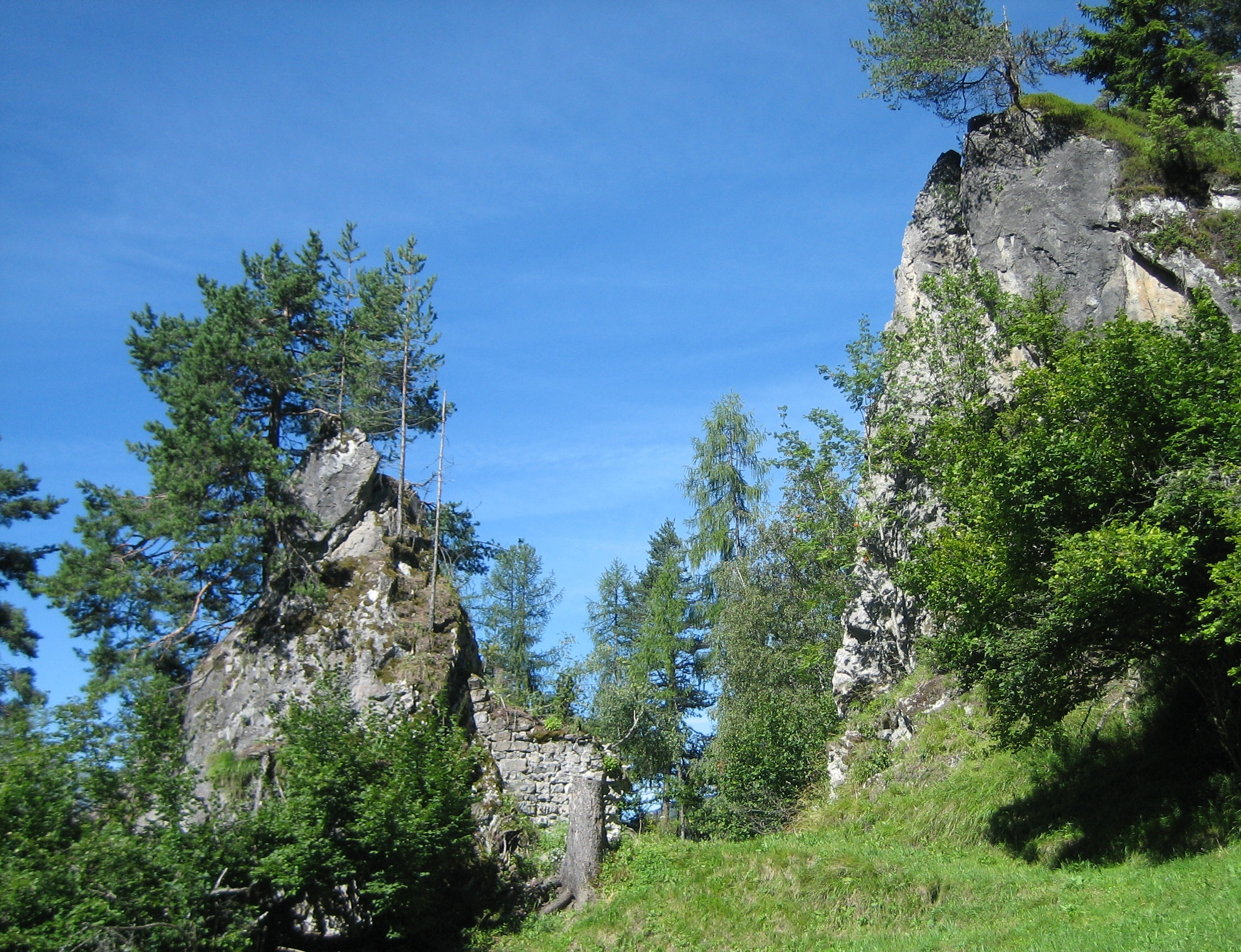
Ruins of the lower gate

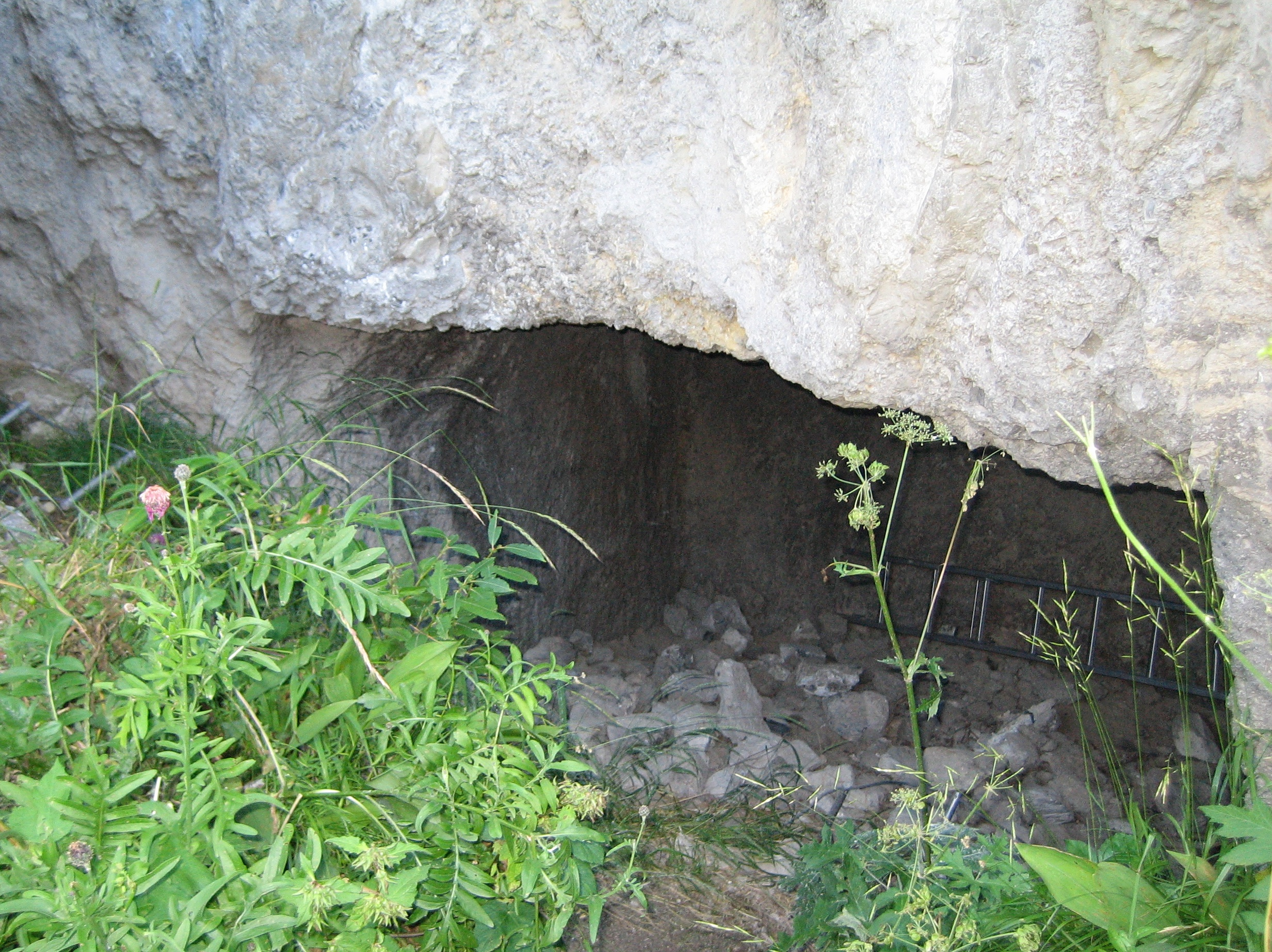
The cistern in the middle castle

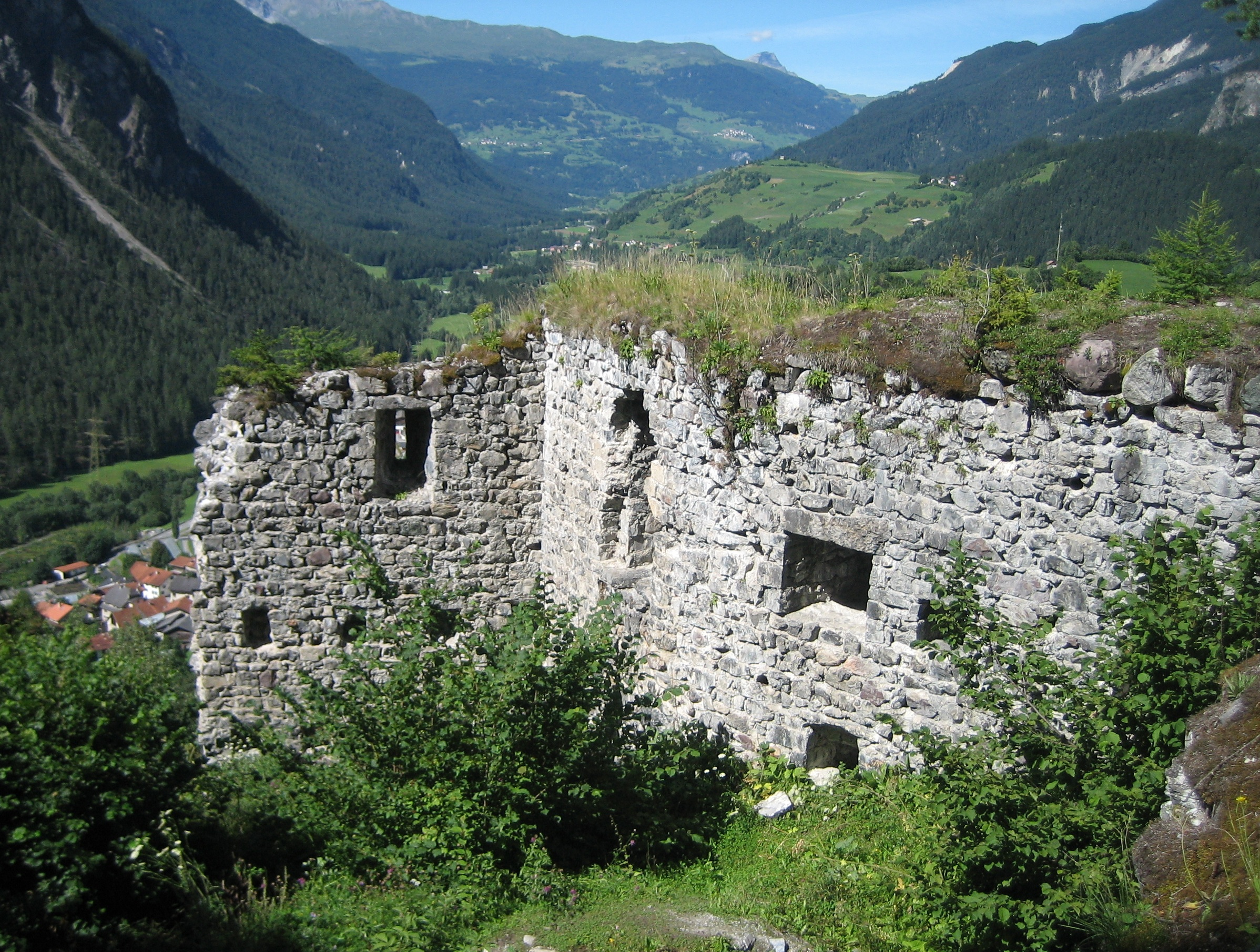
North-west castle walls

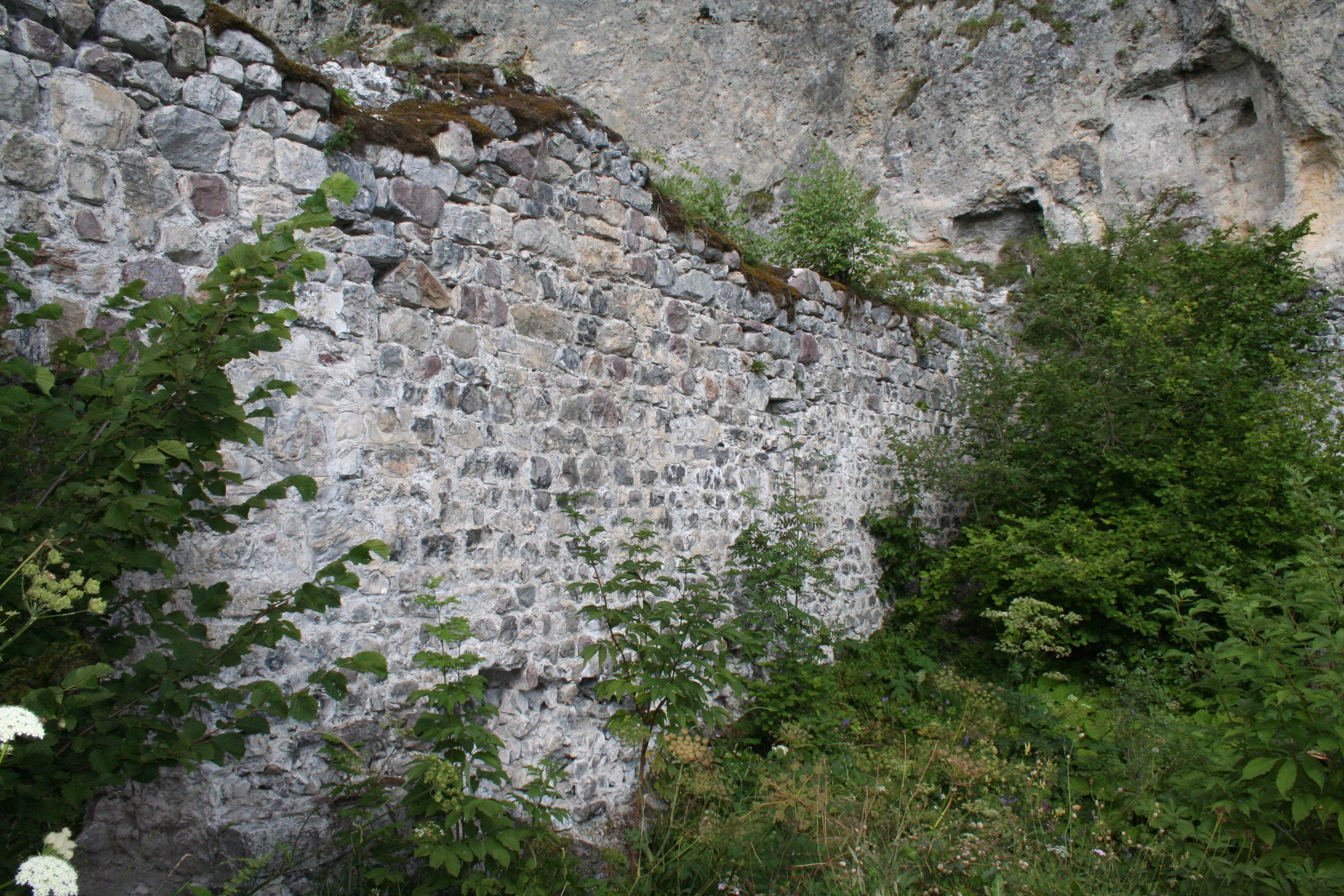
The north wall of the middle castle meeting the eastern cliff face

== See also ==
- List of castles in Switzerland
