= Schmitten, Graubünden =

Schmitten
- Municipality
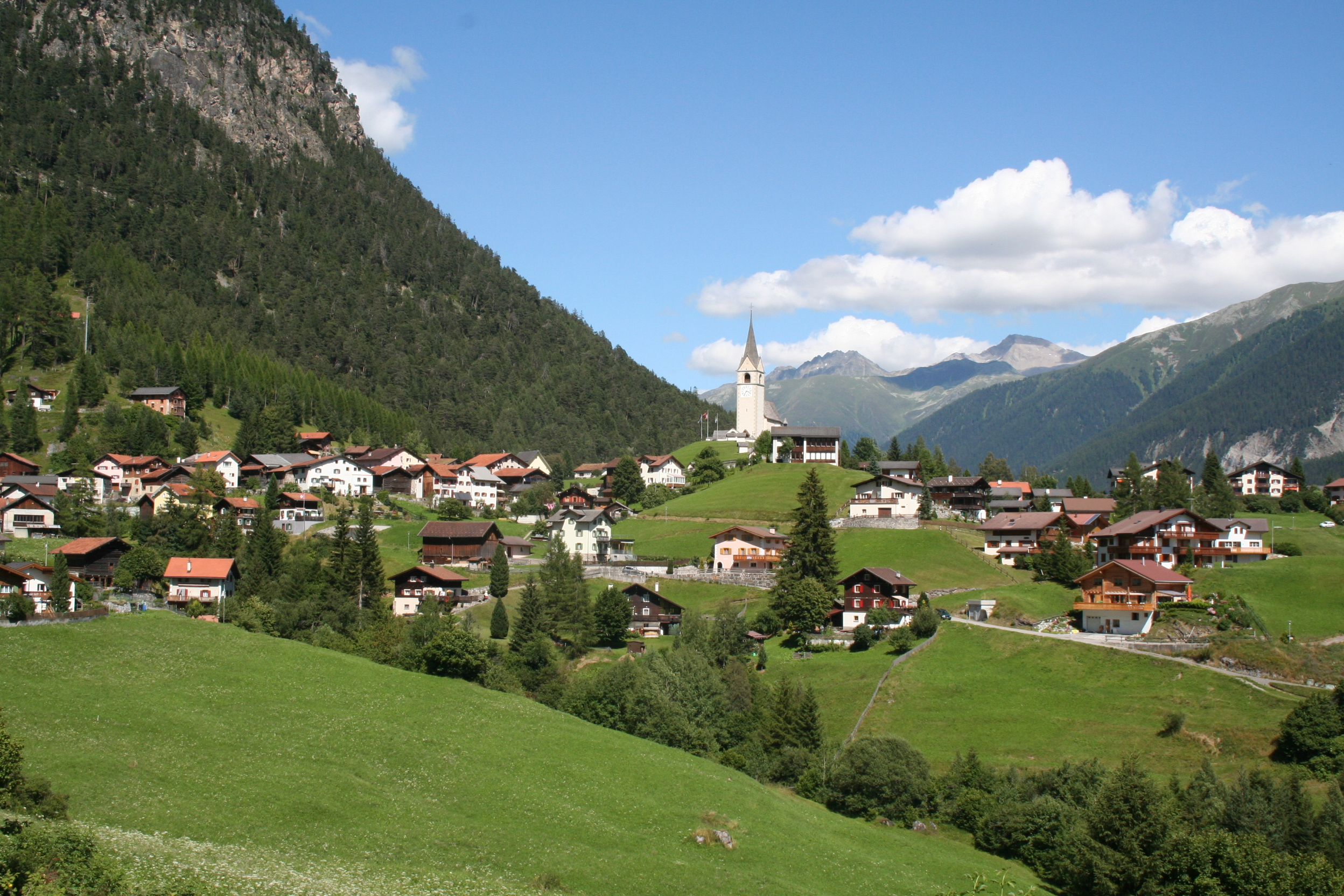
- Schmitten village

- Flag Coat of arms
- Location of Schmitten
- Location within Switzerland Location within Canton of Graubünden
- Coordinates: 46°41′N 9°40′E
- Country: Switzerland
- Canton: Graubünden
- District: Albula

Area
  - Total: 11.32 km^{2} (4.37 sq mi)
- Elevation: 1,301 m (4,268 ft)

Population (December 2020)
  - Total: 222
  - Density: 19.6/km^{2} (50.8/sq mi)
- Time zone: UTC+01:00 (CET)
  - Summer (DST): UTC+02:00 (CEST)
- Postal code: 7493
- SFOS number: 3514
- ISO 3166 code: CH-GR
- Surrounded by: Alvaneu, Arosa, Filisur, Wiesen
- Website: https://www.schmitten-gr.ch SFSO statistics

Schmitten (Romansh: Ferrera) is a municipality in the Albula Region in the canton of Graubünden in Switzerland.

== History ==
Schmitten is first mentioned in 1447 as Schmiten.

== Geography ==
Aerial view (1954)

Schmitten has an area, as of 2006, of 11.3 km^{2} (4.4 sq mi). Of this area, 25.1% is used for agricultural purposes, while 57.1% is forested. Of the rest of the land, 1.7% is settled (buildings or roads) and the remainder (16.2%) is non-productive (rivers, glaciers or mountains).

Before 2017, the municipality was located in the Belfort sub-district of the Albula District, after 2017 it was part of the Albula Region. It consists of the linear village of Schmitten which is located at an elevation of 1,280 m (4,200 ft) on the right side of the Albula valley.

== Demographics ==
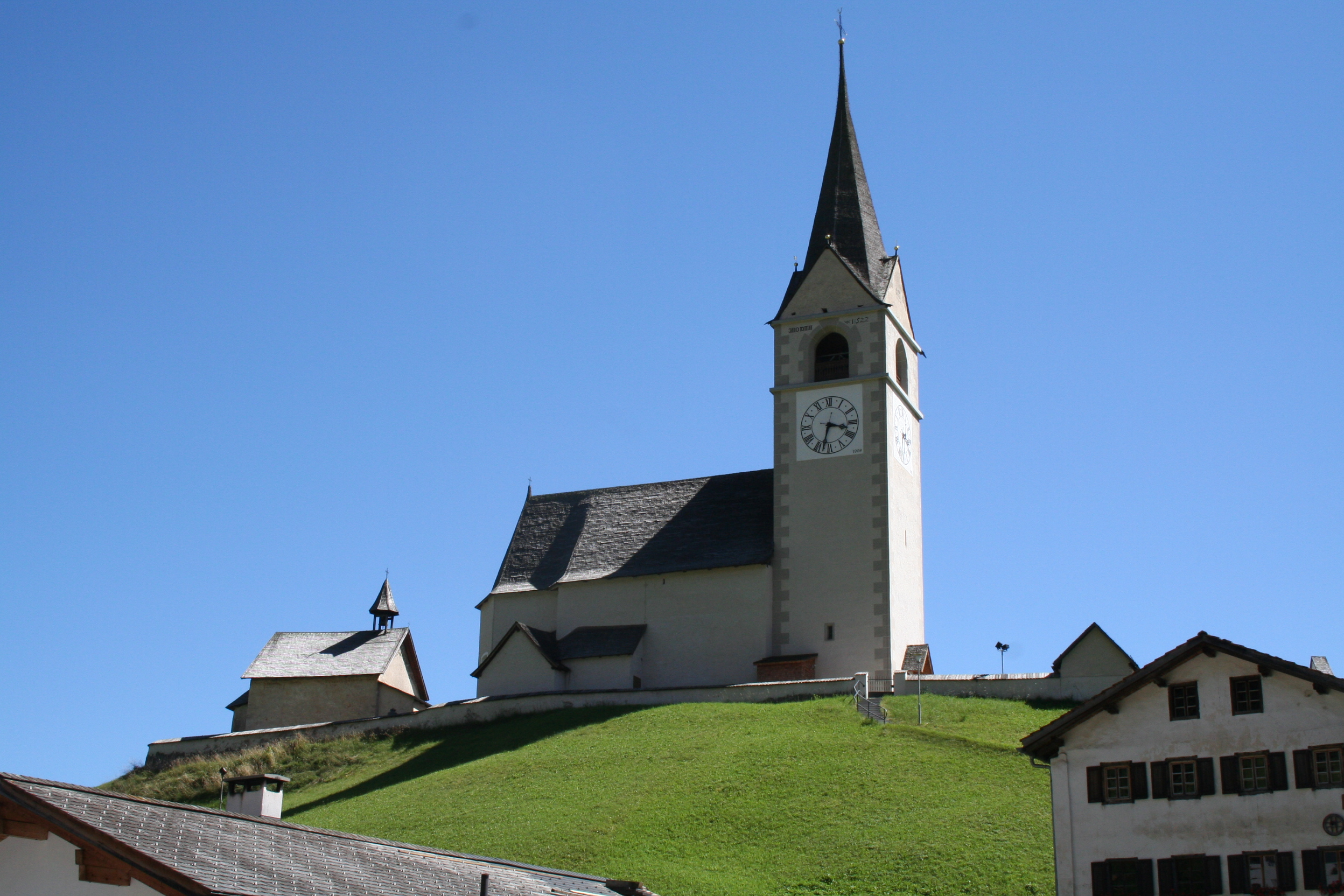
Schmitten Church

Schmitten has a population (as of 31 December 2020) of 222. As of 2008, 10.5% of the population was made up of foreign nationals. Over the last 10 years the population has grown at a rate of 1.6%.

As of 2000, the gender distribution of the population was 50.7% male and 49.3% female. The age distribution, as of 2000, in Schmitten is; 66 people or 10.6% of the population are between 0 and 9 years old. 46 people or 7.4% are 10 to 14, and 46 people or 7.4% are 15 to 19. Of the adult population, 74 people or 11.9% of the population are between 20 and 29 years old. 119 people or 19.2% are 30 to 39, 82 people or 13.2% are 40 to 49, and 73 people or 11.8% are 50 to 59. The senior population distribution is 43 people or 6.9% of the population are between 60 and 69 years old, 47 people or 7.6% are 70 to 79, there are 21 people or 3.4% who are 80 to 89, and there are 3 people or 0.5% who are 90 to 99.

In the 2007 federal election the most popular party was the SVP which received 41.1% of the vote. The next three most popular parties were the CVP (33.8%), the FDP (16.6%) and the SPS (7.6%).

In Schmitten about 75.9% of the population (between age 25-64) have completed either non-mandatory upper secondary education or additional higher education (either university or a Fachhochschule).

Schmitten has an unemployment rate of 0.63%. As of 2005, there were 4 people employed in the primary economic sector and about 2 businesses involved in this sector. 42 people are employed in the secondary sector and there are 3 businesses in this sector. 25 people are employed in the tertiary sector, with 4 businesses in this sector.

The historical population is given in the following table:

year	population
1623	170
1850	205
1900	249
1950	329
1960	248
1970	233
1980	208
1990	252
2000	244

== Heritage sites of national significance ==
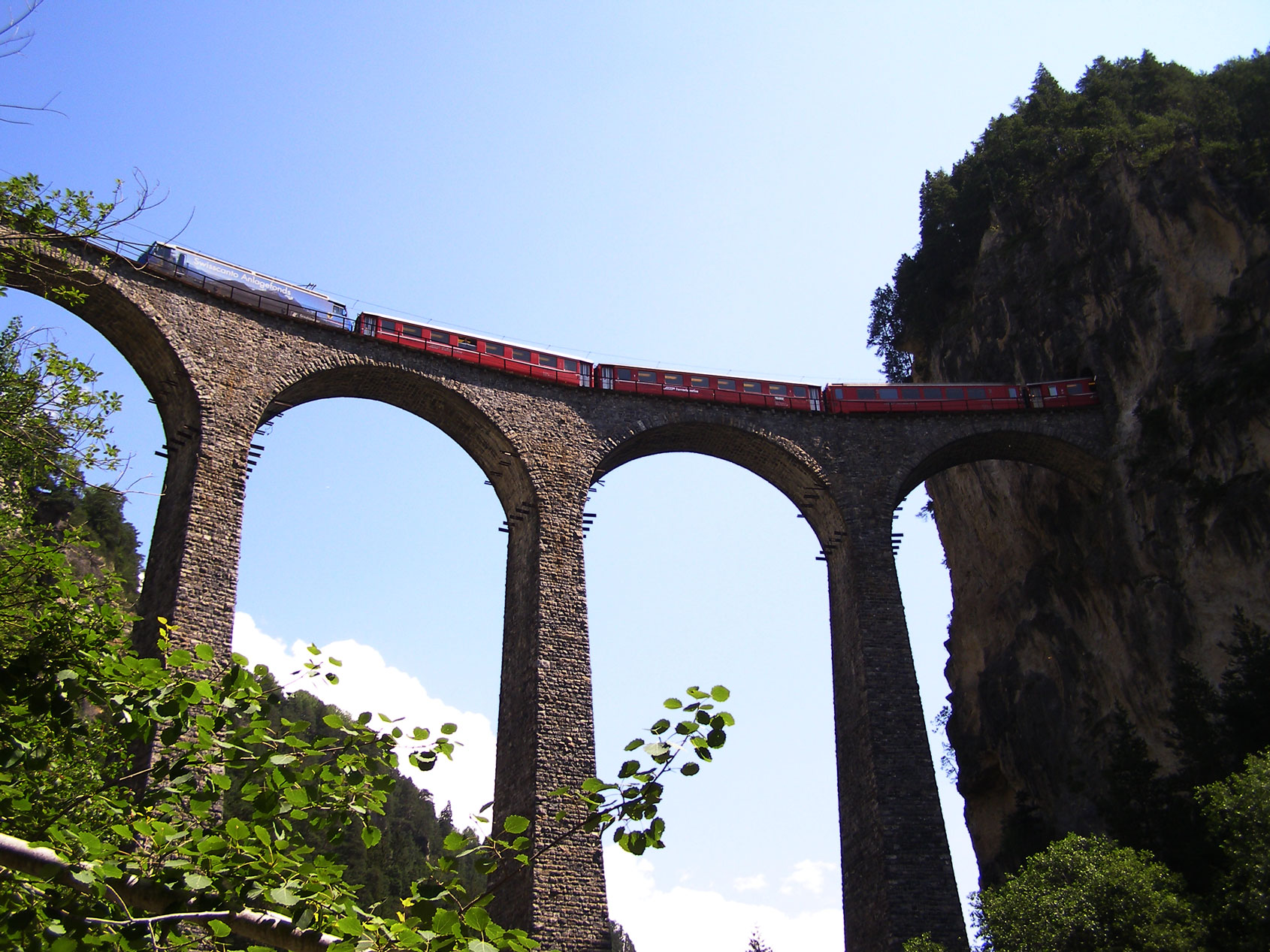
Landwasser Viaduct

The Schmittentobel and Landwasser Viaducts of the Rhaetian Railway are listed as Swiss heritage sites of national significance.

== Languages ==
In the 14th and 15th centuries, the area was settled from Davos. Therefore, the municipality is traditionally German-speaking. Despite the neighboring Romansh-speaking villages, the percentage of Romansch speakers in Schmitten has always been well under 10%. (as of 2000), most of the population speaks German (94.2%), with Portuguese being second most common ( 2.1%) and Romansh being third ( 1.2%).

Languages in Schmitten GR
Language	Census of 1980		Census of 1990		Census of 2000	
Language	Number	Percentage	Number	Percentage	Number	Percentage
German	195	93.75%	243	96.43%	229	94.24%
Romansh	11	5.29%	3	1.19%	3	1.23%
Italian	2	0.96%	0	0.00%	2	0.82%
Population	208	100%	252	100%	243	100%
