= Filisur =

- Former municipality
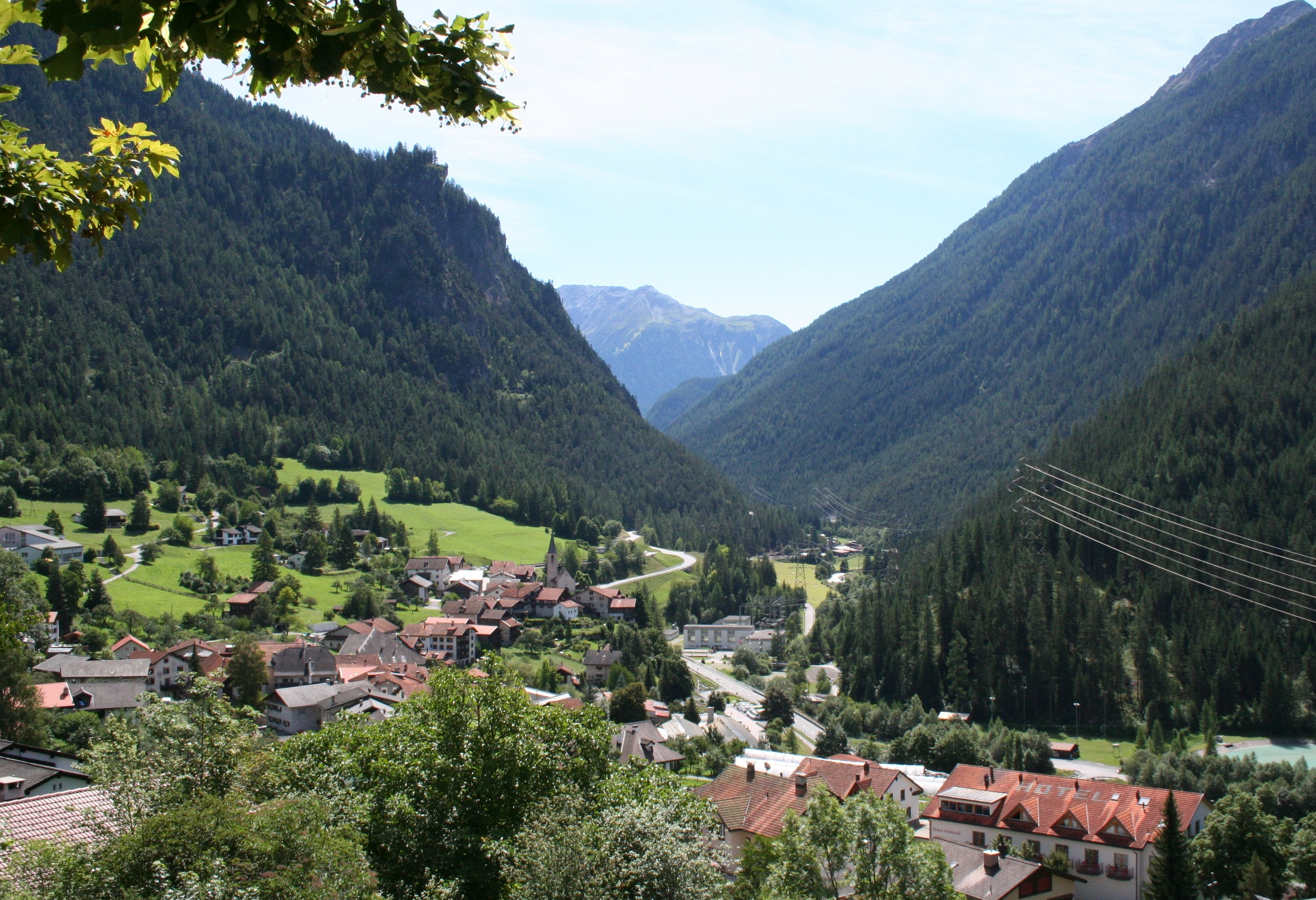
- View of Filisur looking southeast, upwards towards the Albula Pass

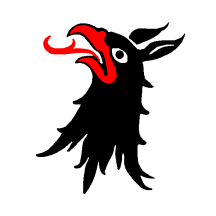
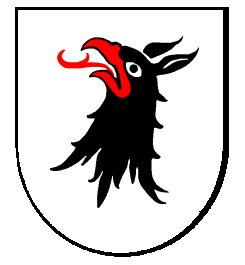
- Flag Coat of arms
- Location of Filisur
- Location within Switzerland Location within Canton of Graubünden
- Coordinates: 46°40′N 9°41′E
- Country: Switzerland
- Canton: Graubünden
- District: Albula

Area
  - Total: 44.58 km^{2} (17.21 sq mi)
- Elevation: 1,032 m (3,386 ft)

Population (December 2020)
  - Total: 434
  - Density: 9.74/km^{2} (25.2/sq mi)
- Time zone: UTC+01:00 (CET)
  - Summer (DST): UTC+02:00 (CEST)
- Postal code: 7477
- SFOS number: 3522
- ISO 3166 code: CH-GR
- Surrounded by: Alvaneu, Bergün/Bravuogn, Savognin, Schmitten, Tiefencastel, Tinizong-Rona, Davos
- Website: www.filisur.ch

Filisur is an Alpine village and former municipality in the Albula Region in the canton of Graubünden in Switzerland. The village sits on a hillside with a view to the west where the two rivers Albula/Alvra from the Albula Pass and Landwasser from Davos meet. On 1 January 2018 the former municipalities of Bergün/Bravuogn and Filisur merged into the new municipality of Bergün Filisur.

== History ==
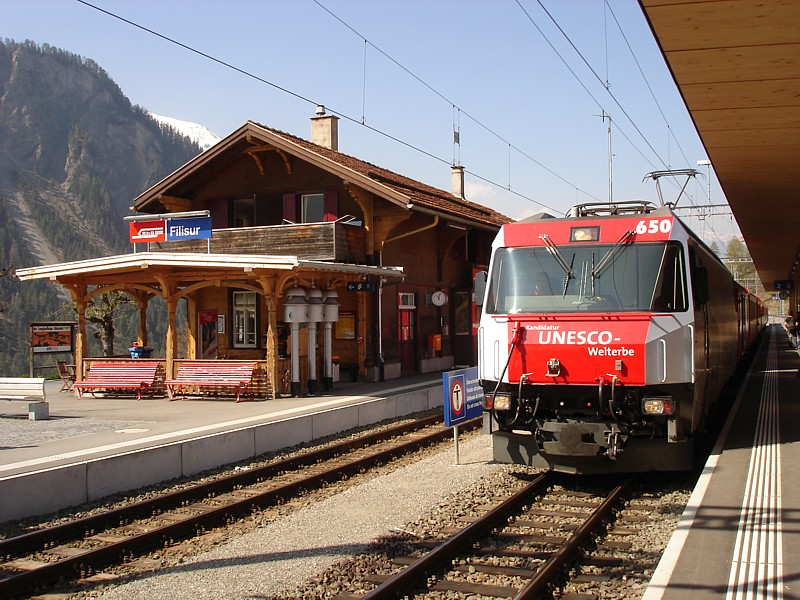
Filisur railway station

Filisur is first mentioned in 1262 as villa Fallisour.

== Geography ==
Aerial view (1947)

Filisur has an area, as of 2006, of 44.6 km^{2} (17.2 sq mi). Of this area, 18.1% is used for agricultural purposes, while 46.6% is forested. Of the rest of the land, 1.6% is settled (buildings or roads) and the remainder (33.7%) is non-productive (rivers, glaciers or mountains).

Before 2017, the municipality was located in the Bergün subdistrict of the Albula district, since 2017 it is part of the Albula Region. It consists of the village of Filisur and the hamlet of Jenisberg at an elevation of 1,504 m (4,934 ft).

== Demographics ==
Filisur has a population (as of 31 December 2020) of 434. As of 2008, 14.1% of the population was made up of foreign nationals. Over the last 10 years the population has grown at a rate of 0.8%. Most of the population (as of 2000) speaks German (84.5%), with Italian being second most common (6.7%) and Romansh being third (3.0%).

As of 2000, the gender distribution of the population was 49.5% male and 50.5% female. The age distribution, as of 2000, in Filisur is; 58 people or 12.4% of the population are between 0 and 9 years old. 36 people or 7.7% are 10 to 14, and 23 people or 4.9% are 15 to 19. Of the adult population, 60 people or 12.9% of the population are between 20 and 29 years old. 57 people or 12.2% are 30 to 39, 67 people or 14.4% are 40 to 49, and 72 people or 15.5% are 50 to 59. The senior population distribution is 39 people or 8.4% of the population are between 60 and 69 years old, 31 people or 6.7% are 70 to 79, there are 17 people or 3.6% who are 80 to 89, and there are 6 people or 1.3% who are 90 to 99.

In the 2007 federal election the most popular party was the FDP which received 36.5% of the vote. The next three most popular parties were the SVP (33.3%), the SPS (22%) and the CVP (6.5%).

In Filisur about 69.4% of the population (between age 25-64) have completed either non-mandatory upper secondary education or additional higher education (either university or a Fachhochschule).

Filisur has an unemployment rate of 2.02%. As of 2005, there were 72 people employed in the primary economic sector and about 10 businesses involved in this sector. 34 people are employed in the secondary sector and there are 8 businesses in this sector. 86 people are employed in the tertiary sector, with 16 businesses in this sector.

The historical population is given in the following table:

| year | population |
|---|---|
| 1803 | 164 |
| 1850 | 280 |
| 1888 | 273 |
| 1900 | 644^{a} |
| 1910 | 333 |
| 1950 | 375 |
| 1960 | 318 |
| 1970 | 325 |
| 1980 | 410 |
| 1990 | 413 |
| 2000 | 333 |

^a Population increase during construction of the Rhaetian Railway line

== Weather ==
Filisur has an average of 109.9 days of rain per year and on average receives 893 mm (35.2 in) of precipitation. The wettest month is August during which time Filisur receives an average of 122 mm (4.8 in) of precipitation. During this month there is precipitation for an average of 12.3 days. The driest month of the year is February with an average of 43 mm (1.7 in) of precipitation over 12.3 days.

== Heritage sites of national significance ==
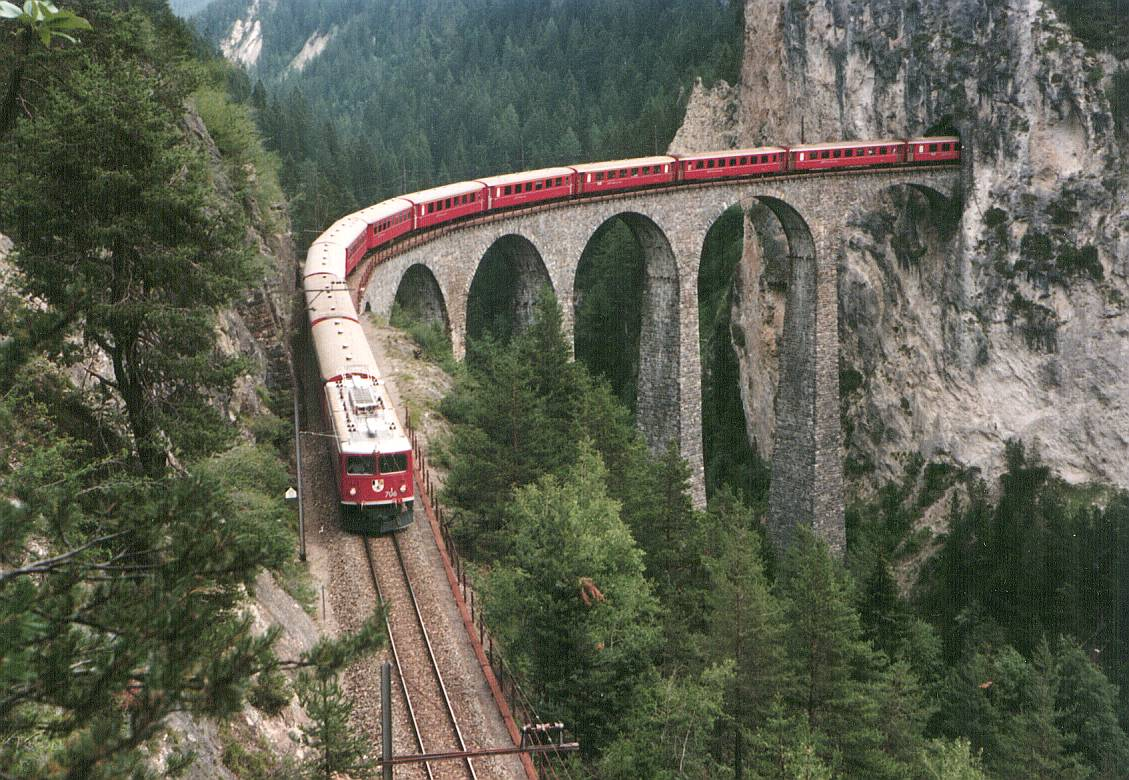
Landwasser Viaduct, 65 m (213 ft) high and 136 m (446 ft) long, built in 1902

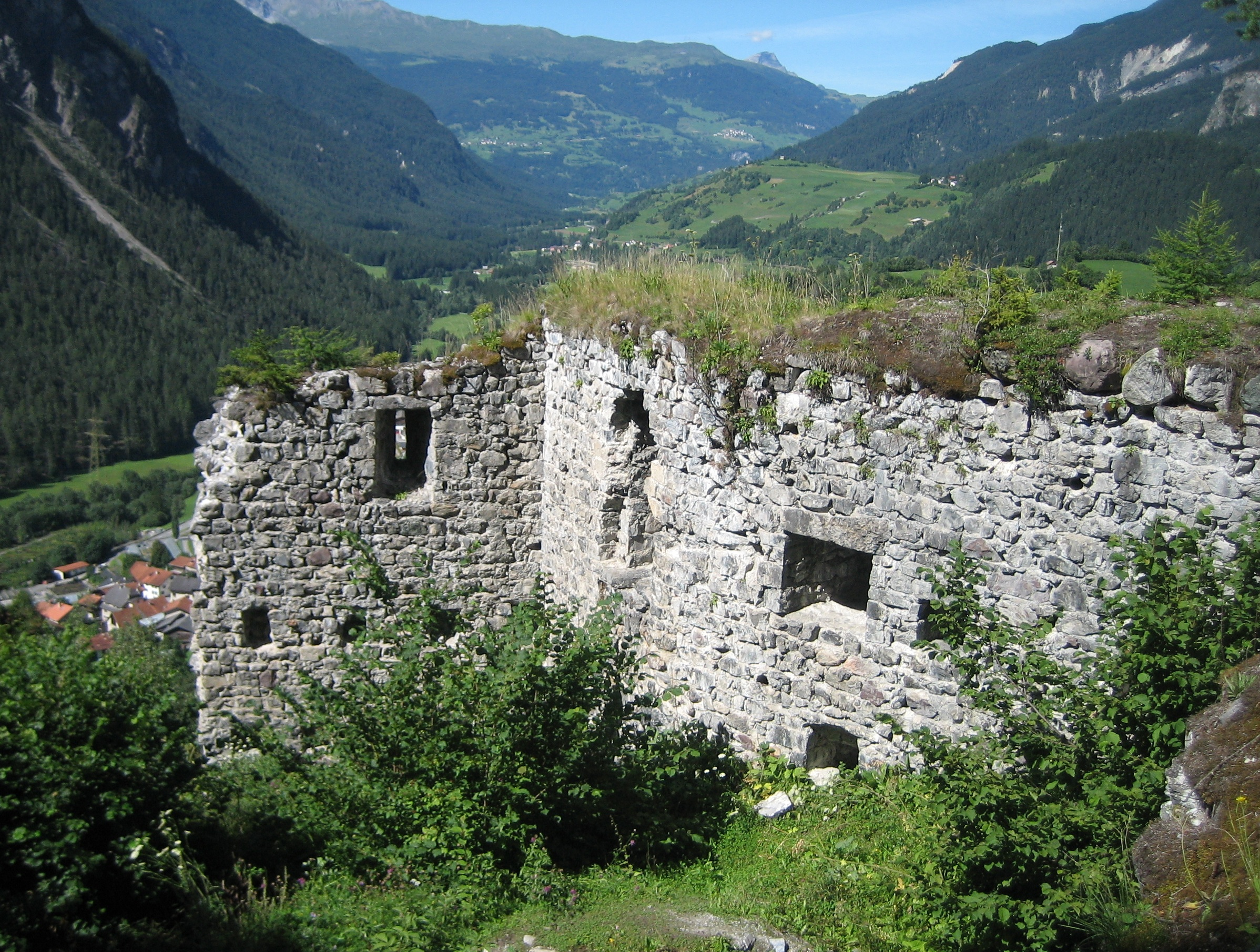
Ruins of Greifenstein Castle

The castle ruins of Greifenstein and the Schmittentobel-Landwasser Viaduct of the Rhaetian Railway are listed as Swiss heritage sites of national significance.

== Transportation ==
Filisur's railway station is located in the northwest of the village 50 metres above the center and served by the Rhaetian Railway (RhB), the Glacier Express and the Bernina Express on the route between Chur (585 metres (1,919 ft)) and St. Moritz (1,775 metres (5,823 ft)). It is also the end station for the line to Davos.

PostBus Switzerland also operate services through the village.
