= Albula railway line =

Railway line in canton of Graubünden, Switzerland

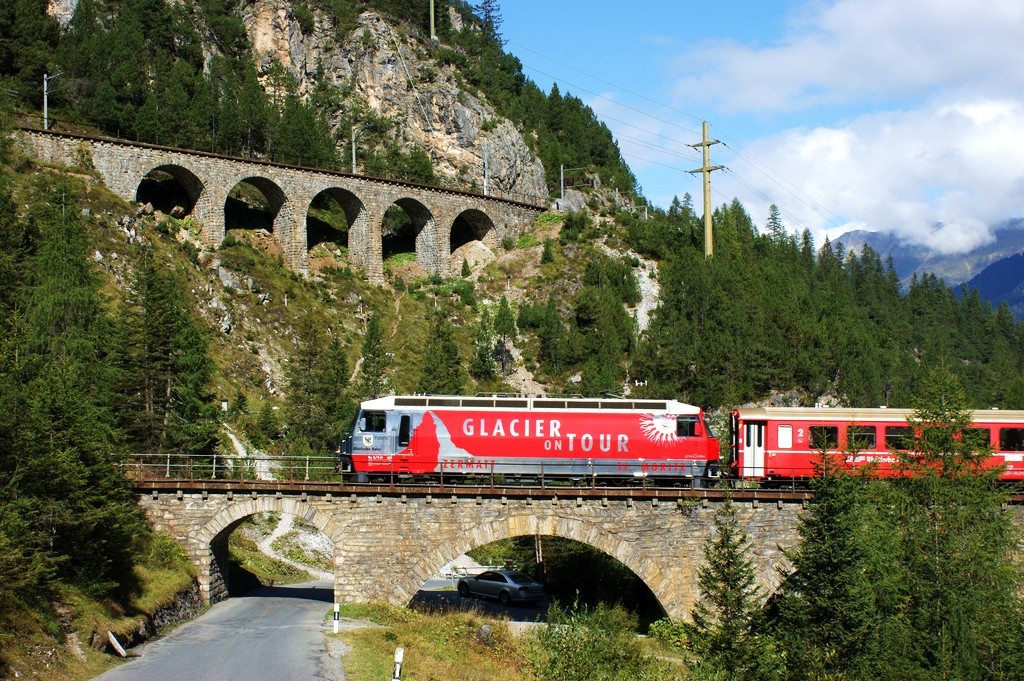
- An RhB train amidst the spiral tunnels

Overview
- Status: Operating
- Owner: Rhaetian Railway
- Locale: Albula, Graubünden, Switzerland
- Termini: Thusis 46°41′54″N 9°26′26″E; St Moritz 46°29′52″N 9°50′47″E
- Stations: 12
- Website: Rhaetian Railway

Service
- Type: Metre gauge heavy rail
- System: Rhaetian Railway
- Operator(s): Rhaetian Railway

History
- Opened: 1 July 1903 / 10 July 1904

Technical
- Line length: 61.67 km (38.32 mi)
- Number of tracks: Single track with Passing loops (Double track from Samedan to Bever)
- Track gauge: Metre (3 ft 3 3/8 in)
- Electrification: Overhead catenary, 11 kV AC 16 2/3 Hz
- Operating speed: 90 km/h (56 mph)
- Highest elevation: 1,815 m (5,955 ft) above sea level
- Maximum incline: 3.5%

UNESCO World Heritage Site
- Part of: Rhaetian Railway in the Albula / Bernina Landscapes
- Criteria: Cultural: (ii), (iv)
- Reference: 1276
- Inscription: 2008 (32nd Session)

The Albula railway line (German: Albulalinie; Italian: Linea dell'Albula; Romansh: Lingia da l'Alvra) is a single-track metre gauge railway line forming part of the core network of the Rhaetian Railway (RhB), in the canton of Graubünden, Switzerland. It links Thusis on the Hinterrhein at 697 m (2,287 ft) and Filisur at 1,080 m (3,540 ft) with the spa resort of St. Moritz in Engadine at 1,774 m (5,820 ft).

Construction of the Albula line was begun in September 1898, the opening took place on 1 July 1903, and the extension to St. Moritz commenced operations on 10 July 1904. With its 55 bridges and 39 tunnels, the 61.67-kilometre-long (38.32 mi) line is one of the most spectacular narrow gauge railways in the world.

On 7 July 2008, the Albula line and the Bernina railway line, which also forms part of the RhB, were jointly recorded in the list of UNESCO World Heritage Sites, under the name Rhaetian Railway in the Albula / Bernina Landscapes.

The best known trains operating on the Albula line are the Glacier Express and the Bernina Express.

== History ==
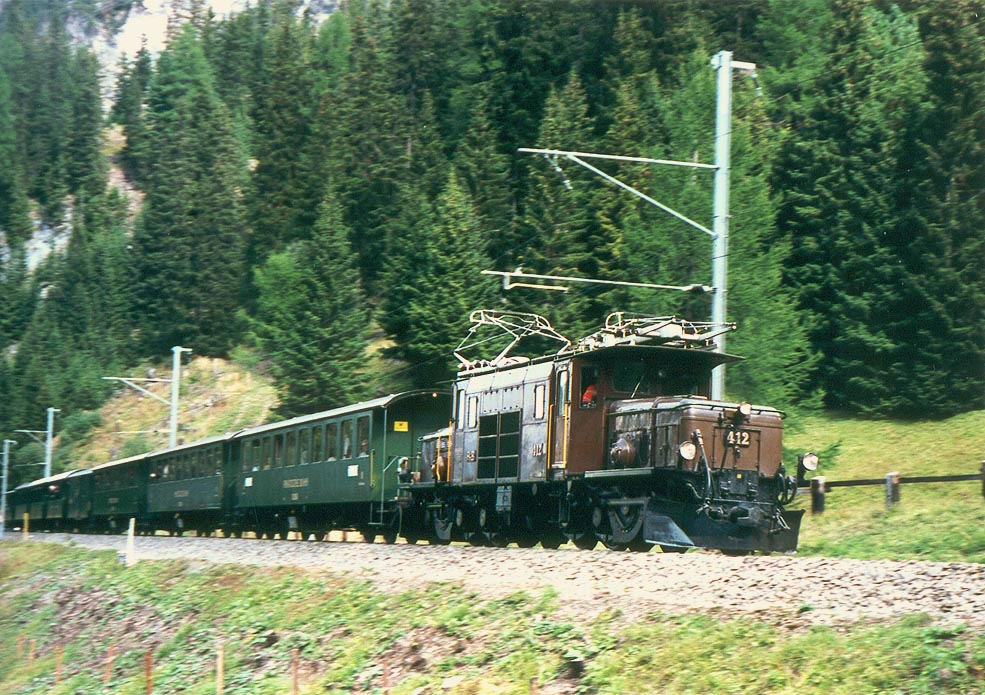
Nostalgic train near Preda

=== Prior situation ===
Up until 1890, the south east of Switzerland was extremely poorly served by railways. Alpine transit traffic was drawn to the Gotthard Railway, so that the construction of transcontinental railways in Graubünden appeared not to be economically viable. Only the success of the Landquart-Davos-Bahn (LD) led to a turning point. In 1895, the LD changed its name to Rhaetian Railway (RhB). Two years later, the people of Graubünden decided, in a referendum, that the RhB would come under state ownership. These two changes created suitable conditions for a rapid construction of further RhB lines, which were intended to open up large parts of the Canton.

=== Proposals ===
In 1890, the Davos hotelier Willem Jan Holsboer proposed the construction of a rail link from Chur via Davos, and through a tunnel under the Scaletta Pass, to St Moritz, and then onwards via the Maloja Pass, to Chiavenna in Italy. Holsboer later had to abandon this planned Scalettabahn, in favour of a route through what was to become the Albula Tunnel. In 1895, the Zurich railway pioneer Adolf Guyer-Zeller presented the idea of an Engadine-Orient-Railway, which would have connected Chur, via Thusis and Engadine, and over the Fuorn Pass, with the Vinschgau and Trieste. Zeller planned this proposed route as a standard gauge line. It would have passed under the Albula Alps through a 12 km (7.5 mi) long tunnel from the mouth of the Val Tisch to the Inn Valley below Bever. As the Ofenbergbahn, the Engadine-Orient-Railway would also have cut a connection through to the Val Müstair. It was only on 30 June 1898 that the Federal Assembly in Bern finally decided on the construction of the Albula railway line. The Federal Assembly thereby also decided against another standard gauge transit railway, and a similarly contemplated railway over the Julier Pass.

In 1896, there were only 20 km (12 mi) of standard gauge railway line in Graubünden, and 90 km (56 mi) of narrow gauge railways. (Incidentally, the length of the standard gauge line has remained unchanged to this day, apart from the construction of a new industrial spur line from Chur to Domat / Ems.) Priority was given to the construction of a rail connection to the spa at St Moritz, which at that time was a 14-hour stage coach ride distant from Chur, the terminus of the standard gauge line.

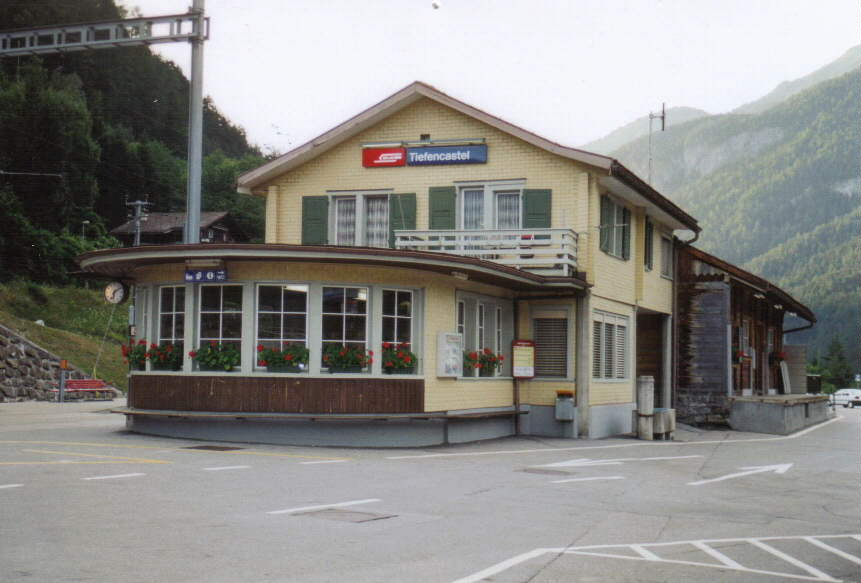
The RhB station at Tiefencastel

=== Construction ===
After Thusis was reached from Chur, the construction of the Albula line began on 15 October 1898. Unlike the Bernina line, which was opened a good ten years later, and operated in fully electrified form right from the start, the Albula line was still a steam railway at its conception. Moreover, (and again unlike the Bernina line), it was intended to be universally available, particularly for the transport of goods. As the steam locomotives of the time were still not particularly powerful, and in order to permit the highest possible speeds, the maximum gradients were restricted to 3.5%, and the minimum curve radius was also generously defined. Thus, the Albula line, in the interests of maximising its effectiveness, did not test the technical bounds of an adhesion railway. However, such an architectural style required a variety of engineering structures. So, for example, the viaducts were exclusively solidly constructed. Especially problematic was the ascent of the valley between Bergün/Bravuogn and Preda, where, in a distance of 5 km (3.1 mi) as the crow flies, a difference in altitude of over 400 m (1,300 ft) needed to be overcome. To stay within the maximum gradient parameters, the project supervisor, Friedrich Hennings, devised an intricate alignment, which lengthened the line's formation by 12 km (7.5 mi). Two curved tunnels, three spiral tunnels, and a number of bridges overcame the engineering problem, by winding the track around like the thread of a screw. On this part of the line, the construction of the 660 m (2,170 ft) long Rugnux Spiral Tunnels in particular led to problems, because the 4 °C (39 °F) cold mountain water hampered the activities of the workers.

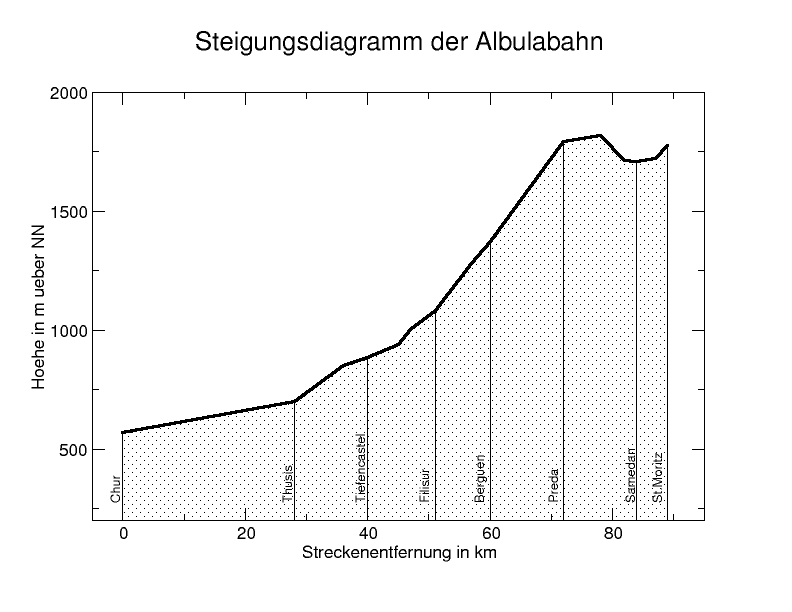
Slope diagram of the Albula railway line

Beyond Preda emerged the centrepiece of the line, the 5,866 m (3.645 mi) long Albula Tunnel, which passes under the watershed between the Rhine and the Danube a few kilometres west of the Albula Pass. With its maximum elevation of 1,820 m (5,970 ft) above sea level, the tunnel is, after the Furka Tunnel, the second highest alpine tunnel in Switzerland. The creation of the tunnel was hampered by unusual problems caused by outflowing water, and these led to the bankruptcy of the building contractor. A total of 1,316 people were involved in the construction of the Albula Tunnel. Overall, there were 16 fatal accidents involving workers. At 03:00 hours on 29 May 1902, the breakthrough of the two tunnel leads was achieved, at a point 3,030.5 m (9,943 ft) from the north portal, and 2,835 m (9,301 ft), from the south portal.

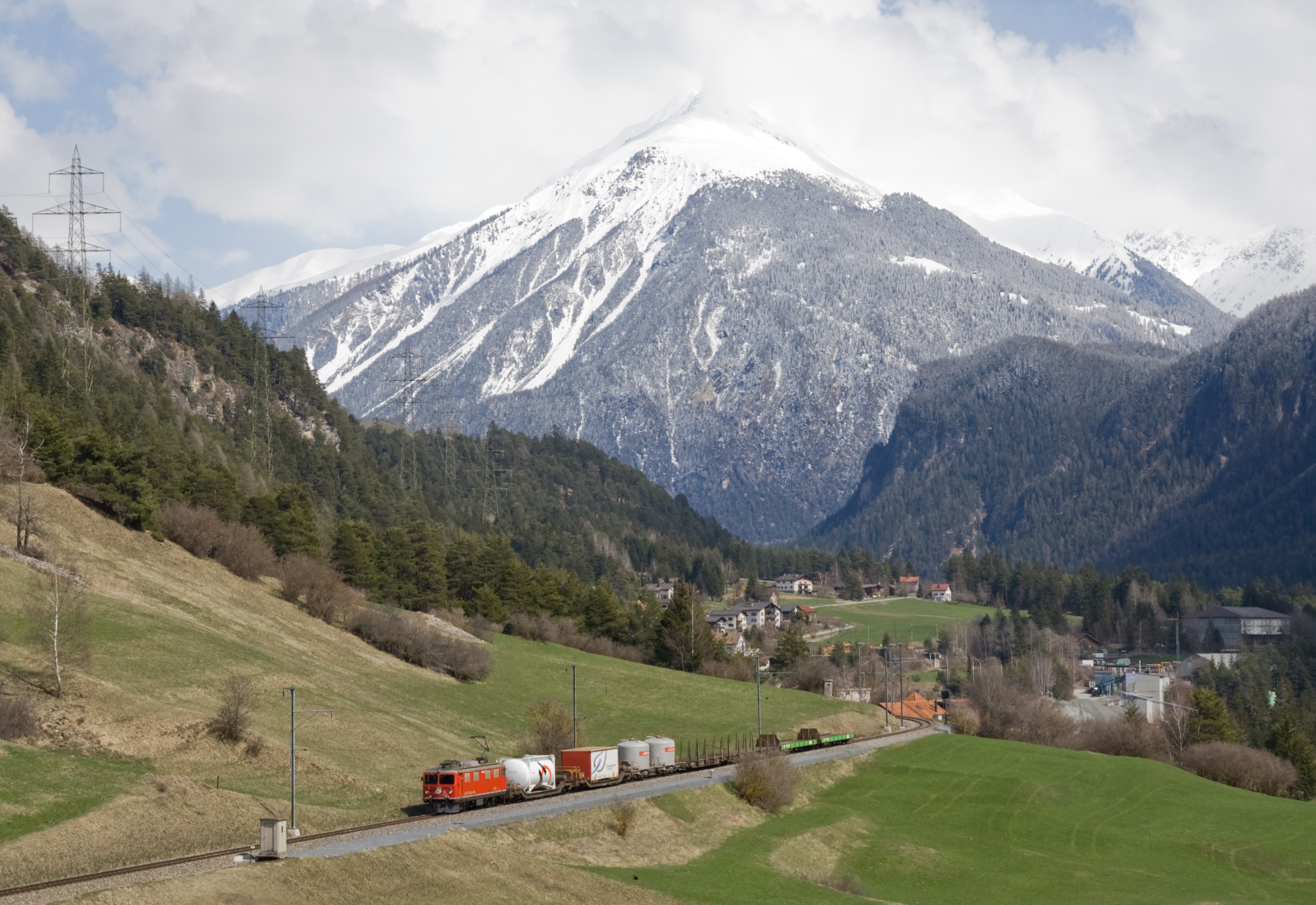
Goods train between Tiefencastel and Surava

=== Opening ===
On 1 July 1903, the opening of the section between Thusis and Celerina could be celebrated. As the RhB and the St Moritz municipality were still yet to reach agreement over the site of the St. Moritz station, the inauguration of the 3 km (1.9 mi) long remaining section had to be delayed to 10 July 1904.

=== Alterations and modernisation ===
Shortages of coal during World War I prompted the RhB to grapple with the task of electrification. On 20 April 1919, the first section of the line to be electrified, the link between Bever and Filisur, was energised with the 11 kV 16 2/3 Hz alternating current system used on the Engadine line. On 15 October 1919, the extension to Thusis followed.

Since 1930, the Glacier Express has followed the route of the Albula line. The Bernina Express was added after World War II. Both of these trains have since operated as spearheads of the Rhaetian Railway's legendary reputation as a railway company amongst rail fans from around the world.

Since the line was equipped with a block safety system in 1969, remote monitoring of train traffic at most stations on the line has been possible. In 2005, the Rail Control Center in Landquart assumed the former tasks of the remote monitoring station at Filisur.

The Bever substation was modernised in 1973. Successive extensions to the passing loops at the stations has lengthened them to over 260 m (850 ft), the equivalent of an express train with 13 carriages. Since the end of the 1990s, the RhB has installed three short double track sections - at Thusis, at Filisur and below Preda - to make the hourly train crossings flow more smoothly. The remaining parts of the line are single track as before, and are still largely in their original configuration from 1904.

=== Record train length ===
In 2022, the operator set a new world record for longest passenger train, when 100 coaches formed a 1.9 km (1.2 mi) long train, travelling a 25 km (16 mi) distance.

== Accidents and incidents ==
- On 13 August 2014, a passenger train was struck by a landslide and derailed at Tiefencastel, Graubünden. Eleven people were injured.

== Description of the railway ==
The Albula line begins in Thusis, where it connects with the Landquart-Chur railway, built in 1896. Behind Thusis station, the line crosses the Hinterrhein, as well as the A 13 Autobahn, and enters the Albula Valley, which, east of Thusis, is known as the Schinschlucht. Even at this early stage, it passes many bridges and tunnels. After Solis station, 8 km (5.0 mi) from Thusis, the line crosses the Albula for the first time, on the 89 m (292 ft) high Solis Viaduct, which is both the highest bridge on the Rhaetian Railway, and the broadest span viaduct on the Albula line.

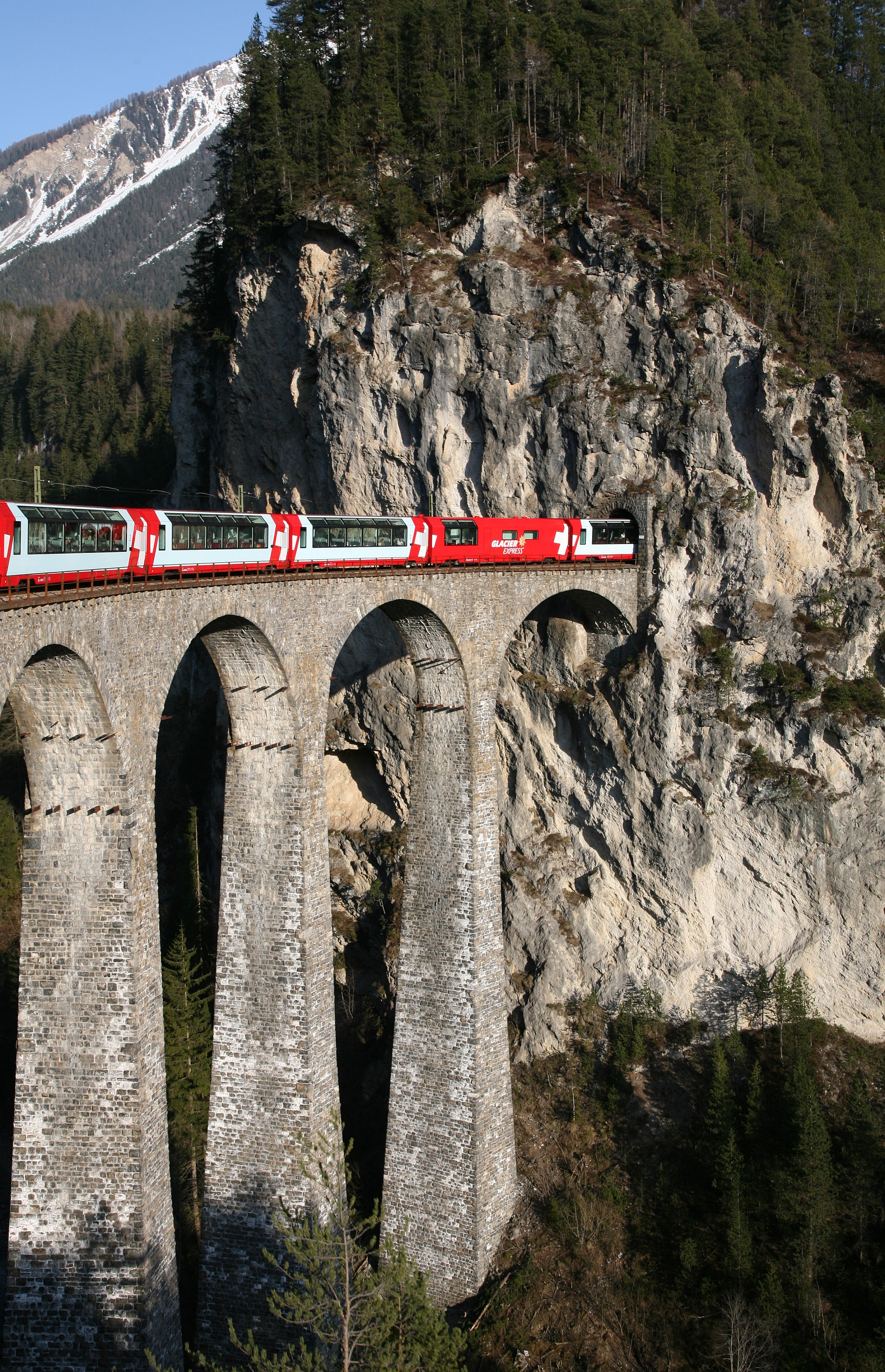
Some of the new Panorama cars, introduced in 2006, on the Landwasser Viaduct near Filisur

Between Tiefencastel and Filisur, the train crosses the 35 m (115 ft) m high and 137 m (449 ft) long Schmittentobel Viaduct. Shortly before Filisur, it reaches one of the trademarks of the Albula line - and often also the Rhaetian Railway in general - the 65 m (213 ft) high Landwasser Viaduct, which in a curve of only 100 m (330 ft) radius leads directly into a tunnel through the cliff face at the opposite end.

Aerial video of a train travelling from Preda to Bergün through several loop tunnels.

At Filisur station is the junction between the Albula line and the branch line from Davos Platz. Between Filisur and Bergün, the train ascends 292 m (958 ft), and runs through the first spiral tunnel. The next section, between Bergün and Preda, is the most demanding example of rail technology on the Albula line: in order to overcome the height difference of 417 m (1,368 ft) between Bergün and Preda – in only 6.5 km (4.0 mi) as the crow flies – without requiring excessive slopes or radii, the route is extended by 12 km (7.5 mi) by various engineering structures (including three spiral tunnels, two curved tunnels and four valley crossing viaducts). Soon after departure from Bergün station, where an RhB Crocodile stands as a locomotive monument, the train climbs once again at a rate of 3.5%. By means of the various structures just identified, the line crosses over itself twice. Rail fans can also view the Bergün-Preda section from a rail history nature trail adjacent to the line.

At the hamlet of Naz, near Preda, the line crosses a brief plateau, where, for several years now, there has been a double track section about 1 km (0.62 mi) long. Soon after the Preda station, which, at 1,789 m (5,869 ft) above sea level, is the highest stopping point on the Albula line, is the north portal of the Albula Tunnel. After passing through the tunnel, and the Spinas station at the southern portal, the train descends at a slope of up to 3.2%, to arrive in the Oberengadine at Bever, in the Val Bever. Here there is a junction with the Engadine Railway from Scuol-Tarasp. At the next station, Samedan, the line to Pontresina branches off. The Bernina Express takes this branch, which connects the Albula line with the Bernina line to Tirano. On the other hand, the Glacier Express follows the main line, via Celerina, to the terminus of the Albula line at St. Moritz.

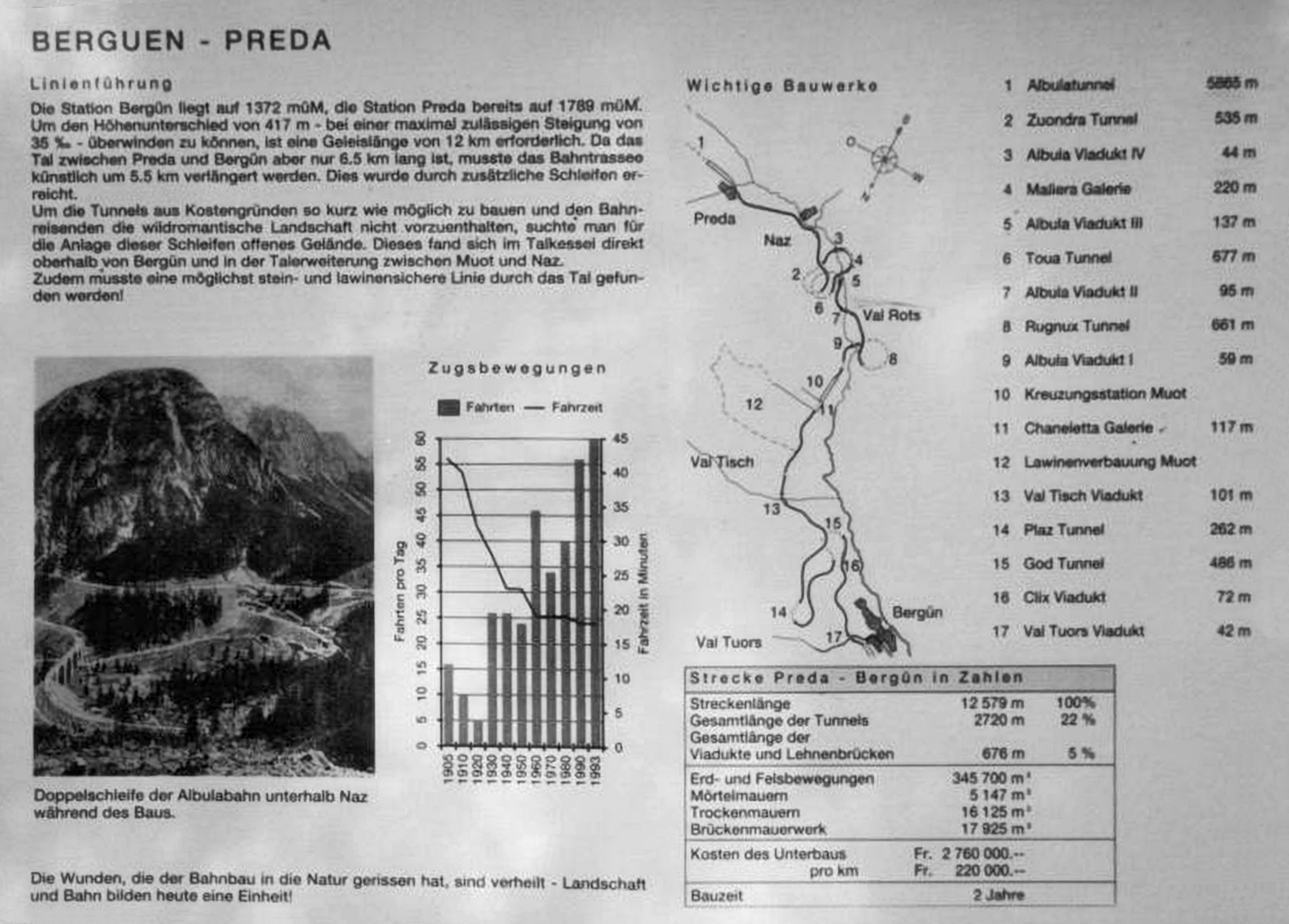
Map of the Bergün-Preda section

Originally, it was planned to extend the Albula line via the Maloja Pass, to Chiavenna in Italy. At the terminus of the extension, there was to have been a connection with the Italian railway line that runs along Lake Como to Milan. In light of those plans, the St Moritz station was, and still is, laid out as a through station. Whereas on the Swiss side plans for a line through the Bergell reached an advanced stage, there were, on the Italian side, only vague statements of intent, for a line proceeding onwards from the border at Castasegna. World War I, and the subsequent economic recession, prevented any implementation of the plans. Today, the Maloja Pass route is served by a cross border post bus line.

== Train traffic ==
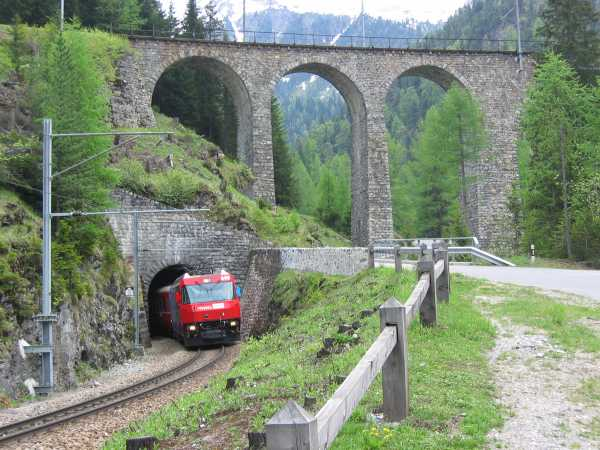
On the Preda-Bergün section, a downhill bound train leaves the Toua curved tunnel, shortly after crossing the Albula Viaduct III.

Between Chur and St Moritz, there are fast trains every day at regular hourly intervals. These trains have been officially known as RegioExpress services since December 2004. For the section Thusis - St Moritz, the fast trains require 1 hour 34 minutes, and therefore travel at an average speed of 39 km/h (24 mph). Only the so-called fast train stations are served by these trains. At the other stations, trains have no longer stopped since the 1990s. In Surava and Alvaneu, only some trains still stop, and only then in off peak times. In the high summer season, there are also special tourist oriented express trains with panorama cars, for which reservations and supplements are required. These trains are the Glacier Express from Zermatt to St Moritz, and the Bernina Express from Chur via Samedan and Pontresina to Tirano.

The most frequently used motive power on the Albula line is the modern Ge 4/4 III class of electric locomotive, which is also in service on the Vereina line. The Albula line was once the main stamping ground of the Rhaetian Crocodile (the Ge 6/6 I). The two remaining locos of this class, and the similarly historic Ge 4/6, still operate today at the head of not uncommon special trains. In contrast, the newer RhB locomotives have not achieved the popularity of the Crocodiles. However, they are in everyday use, and the operational difficulties they face can hardly be compared with those to be found on other railways of this magnitude and gauge, due to the nature of the route, and the density of the traffic. Additionally there is, for a narrow gauge railway, unusually dense goods traffic, which in mountainous terrain takes over much of what would otherwise be carried by road traffic. Almost all of the stations on the line are served with goods trains; the larger stations are equipped with (at least) one shunting locomotive of their own. The most important goods transiting the line are timber, cement and other building materials, mineral oil products and foodstuffs.

A further area of responsibility of the Albula line is the transport of cars through the mountainous terrain, together with their passengers. The alpine weather conditions make it impossible to use the alpine passes all year round, whereas with the help of the Albula line, the mountain barrier can be overcome without any problems. The Rhaetian Railway therefore offers road users the option of loading their own cars in Thusis onto special car carriers, for transport to Samedan.

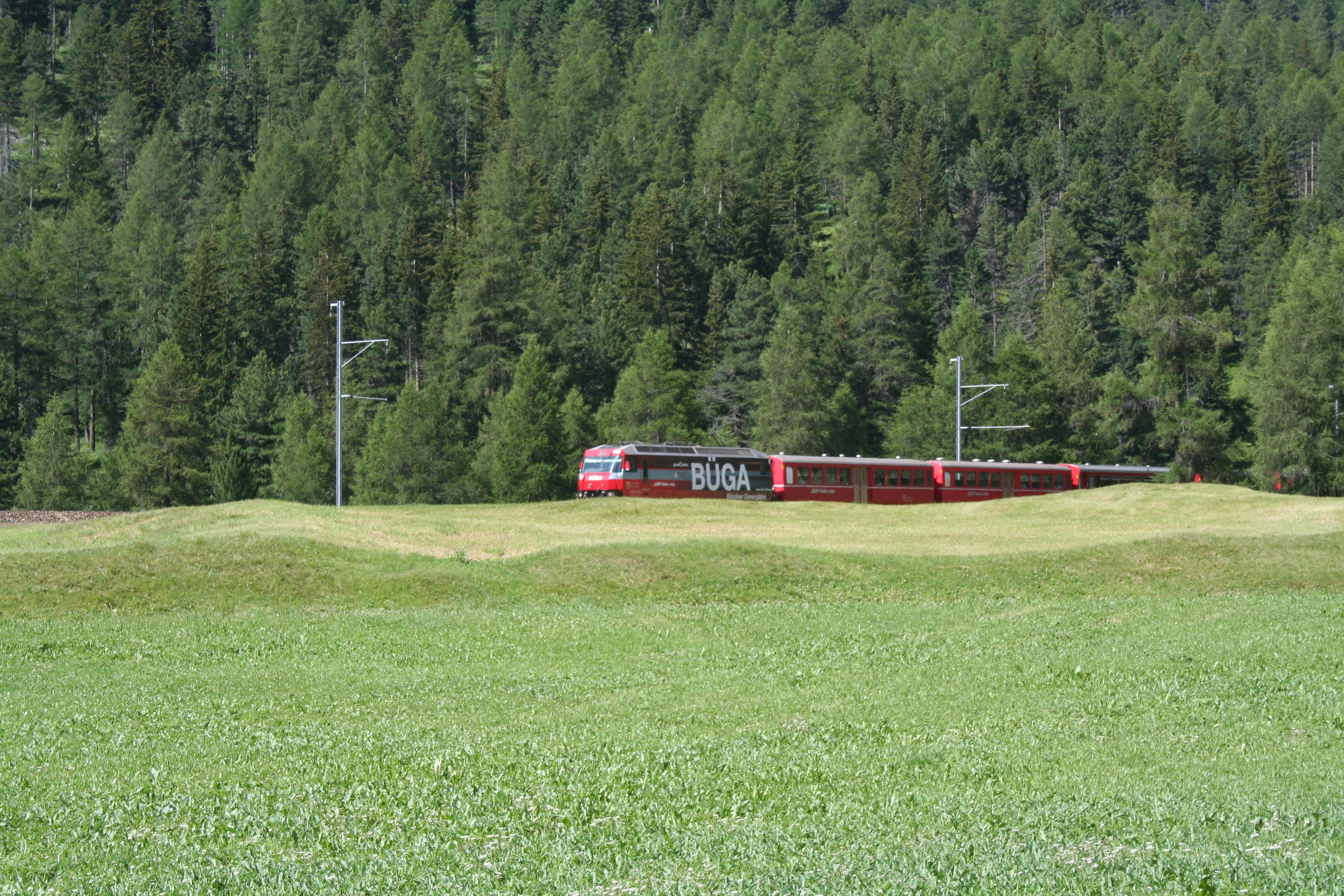
Albula line train near Bever

On the Bergün-Preda section, there are also so-called sledding trains operating in winter. These are shuttle services, which carry sledders and tobogganers from Bergün to Preda. At Preda, the sledders and tobogganers connect with the Albula Pass road, which is closed for traffic in winter, and used as a toboggan track to Bergün.

== See also ==
- Albula Railway Museum
- List of mountain railways in Switzerland

== Bibliography ==
- Gian Brüngger, Tibert Keller, Renato Mengotti: Abenteuer Albulabahn. Chur 2003, ISBN 3-85637-279-2.
- Gion Caprez und Peter Pfeiffer: Albulabahn. Harmonie von Landschaft und Technik. Zürich 2003, ISBN 3-905111-89-6.
- Hubertus von Salis Soglio: Bahnhistorischer Lehrpfad Preda-Bergün. Herausgegeben vom Verkehrsverein Bergün. Thusis ^{5}1997 (sold at RhB outlets or at the Bergün station).
- Henning Wall: Albula–Schlagader Graubündens. Aachen 1984, ISBN 3-921679-33-8.
- Eisenbahn Journal Sonderausgabe Rhätische Bahn (I). Hermann Merker Verlag, Fürstenfeldbruck 1.1988, pp 34–102 ISSN 0720-051X.
- Friedrich Hennings: Projekt und Bau der Albulabahn. Chur 1908.
- Hennings: Die neuen Linien der Rhätischen Bahn. In: Schweizerische Bauzeitung. Vol. 37/38, 1901, ISSN 0036-7524, pp 5–7 (PDF; 2,3 MB).
