= Bergün/Bravuogn railway station =

Railway station in Switzerland

Bergün/Bravuogn
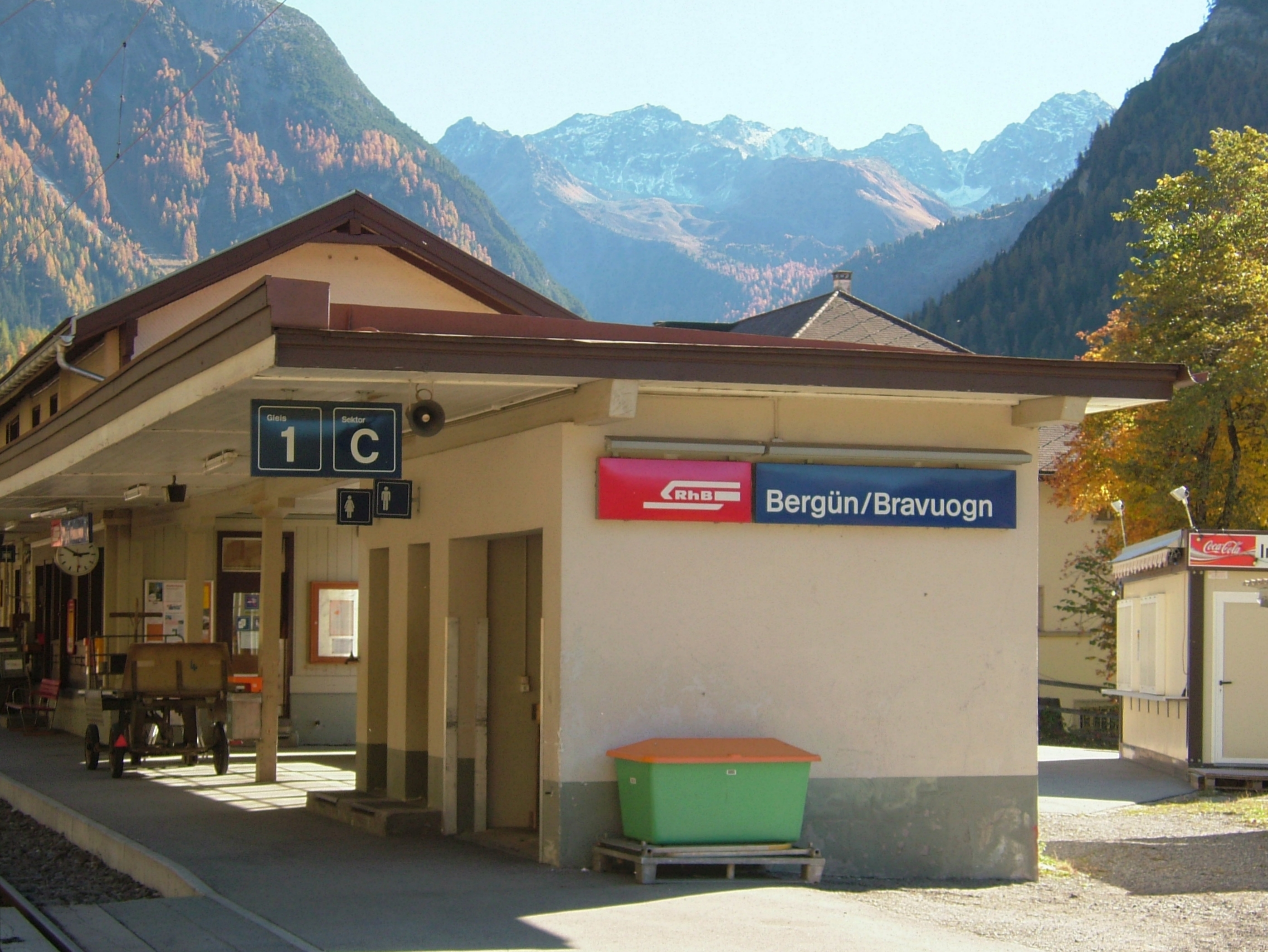
- The station building in 2007

General information
- Location: Stulzerstrasse; Bergün Filisur; Switzerland
- Coordinates: 46°37′52″N 9°44′48″E
- Elevation: 1,372 m (4,501 ft)
- Owner: Rhaetian Railway
- Line: Albula line
- Distance: 73.1 km (45.4 mi) from Landquart
- Platforms: 2
- Train operators: Rhaetian Railway
- Connections: PostAuto Schweiz buses

History
- Opened: 1 July 1903
- Electrified: 20 April 1919

Passengers
- 2018: 770 per weekday

Services
Preceding station	Rhaetian Railway	Following station
Pontresina towards Tirano	Bernina Express	Filisur towards Chur
Preda towards St. Moritz	IR 38	Filisur towards Chur
Location

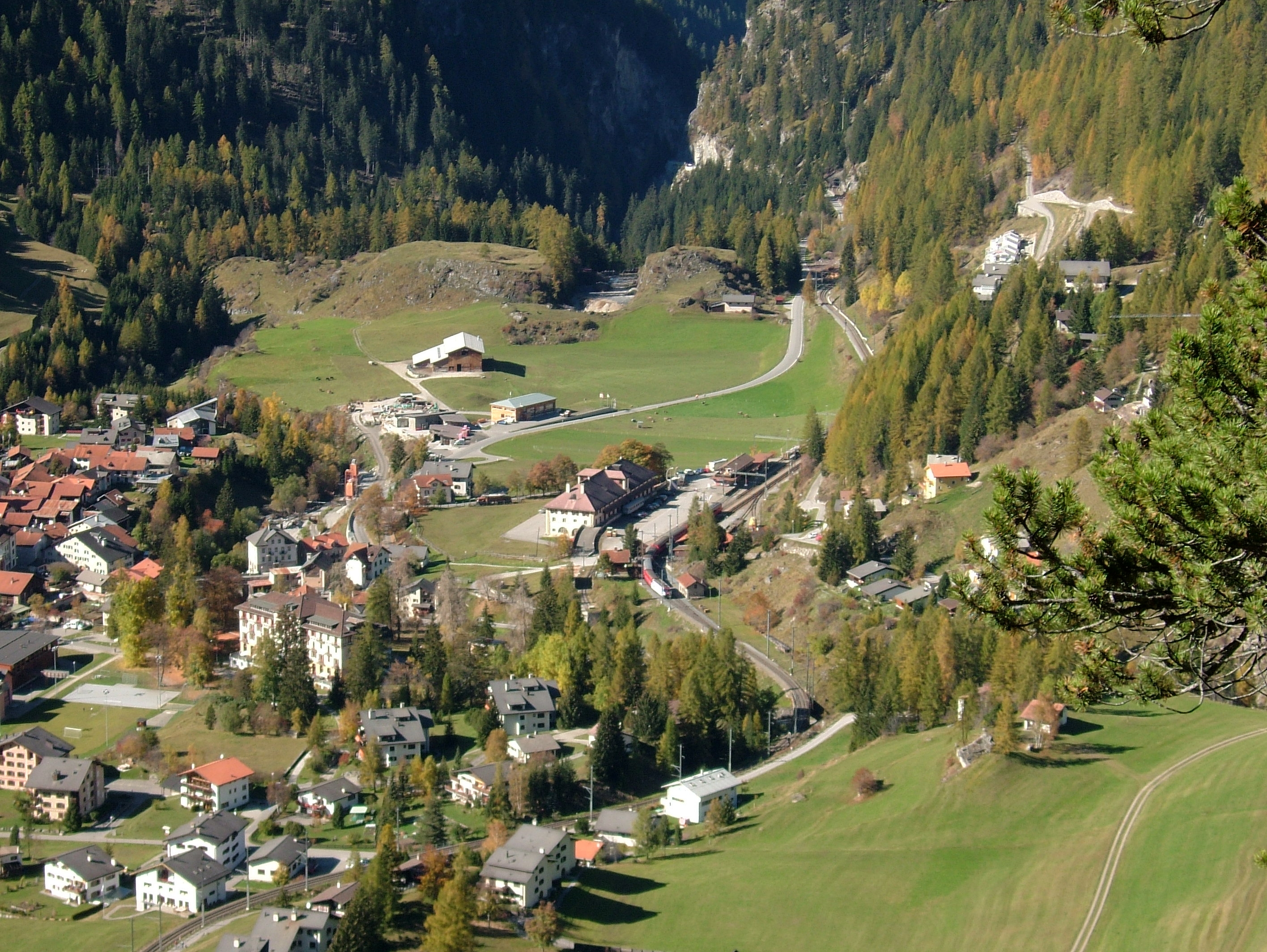
Bergün/Bravuogn station from above

Bergün/Bravuogn railway station is a railway station in the municipality of Bergün Filisur, in the Swiss canton of Graubünden. It is located on the 1,000 mm (3 ft 3 3/8 in) metre gauge Albula line of the Rhaetian Railway. Hourly services operate on this section of the line.

The Bahnmuseum Albula (Albula Railway Museum) is located at the station. The RhB Ge 6/6 #407 "crocodile" has been placed at its entrance.

== Services ==
As of the December 2023 timetable change, the following services stop at Bergün/Bravuogn:

- Bernina Express: Several round-trips per day between Chur and Tirano.
- InterRegio: hourly service between Chur and St. Moritz.
