= Albula Railway Museum =

Railway museum in Switzerland

Coordinates: 46.6309°N 9.7466°E

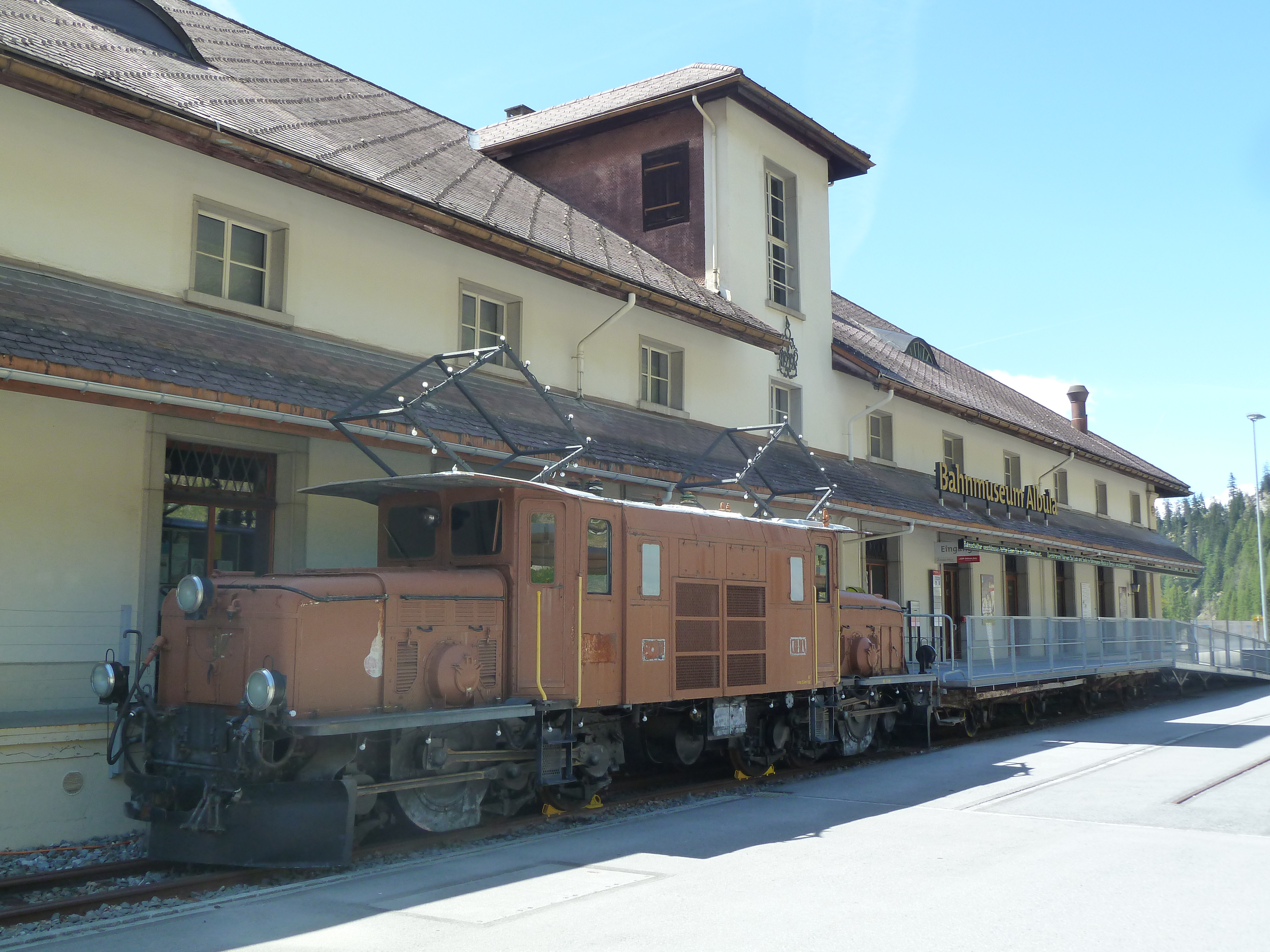
A Ge 6/6 "Crocodile" in front of the museum

The Albula Railway Museum (German: Bahnmuseum Albula) is located at the Bergün/Bravuogn railway station of the Albula Railway of the Swiss Rhaetian Railway. The museum has been in operation since 2012.

It showcases the history of the construction of the Albula Railway, featuring many historical plans and artifacts, including topographic simulations and demonstrations of the tunneling methods.

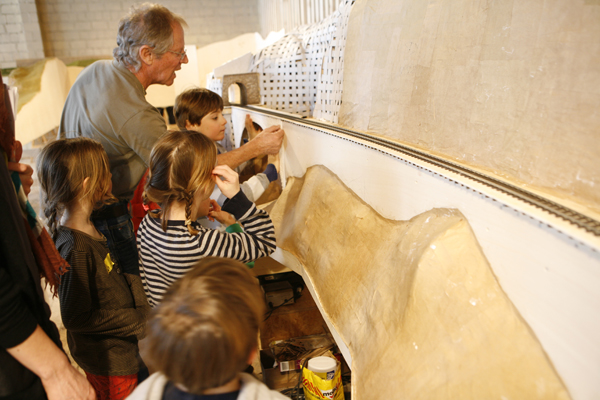
A model display under construction

One section of the museum houses a miniature Albula Railway operating in O scale built by Bernhard Tarnutzer that includes buildings, viaducts, and tunnels from the 1950s and 1960s.

The Rhaetian Railway Ge 6/6 I "crocodile" #407 has been placed at its entrance and can be used by visitors for ride simulations.

== See also ==
- List of museums in Switzerland
- List of railway museums in Switzerland
