= DRG Class E 94 =

German electric locomotives (1940–1995)

DRG Class E 94 DB Class 194 DR Class 254 ÖBB Class 1020
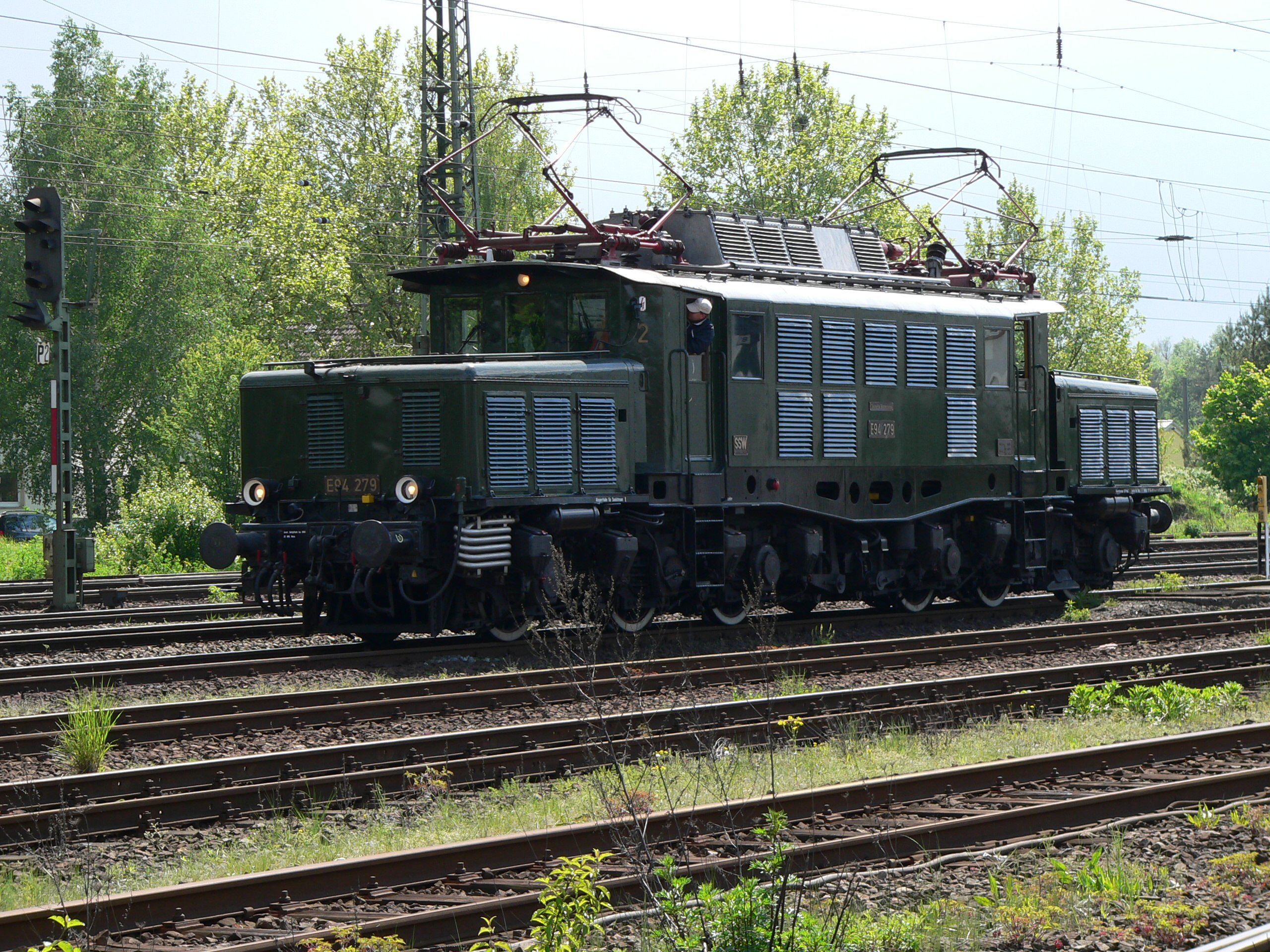
- E94 279 at Kranichstein, May 2005
Type and origin
- Power type: Electric
- Builder: AEG (104); Krauss-Maffei (81); Lokomotivfabrik Floridsdorf, (4); Henschel (6), Krupp (5)
- Build date: 1940–1956
- Total produced: 200
Specifications
- Configuration
  - UIC: Co′Co′
- Gauge: 1,435 mm (4 ft 8 1/2 in)
- Wheel diameter: 1,250 mm (4 ft 1 1/4 in)
- Wheelbase: 13,700 mm (44 ft 11 3/8 in)
  - Bogie: 2,450 mm (8 ft 1/2 in) +; 2,150 mm (7 ft 5/8 in) =; 4,600 mm (15 ft 1 1/8 in)
- Pivot centres: 10,000 mm (32 ft 9 3/4 in)
- Length
  - Over buffers: 18,600 mm (61 ft 1/4 in)
- Width: 3,150 mm (10 ft 4 in)
- Height: 4,650 mm (15 ft 3 1/8 in)
- Axle load: 19.8–20.2 t (19.5–19.9 long tons; 21.8–22.3 short tons)
- Service weight: 118.7–121.0 t (116.8–119.1 long tons; 130.8–133.4 short tons)
- Electric system/s: 15 kV 16 2/3 Hz AC Catenary
- Current pickup: Pantograph
- Traction motors: nose-suspended, 6 off
- Safety systems: SiFa; Indusi/PZB i54 or i60
Performance figures
- Maximum speed: 90 or 100 km/h (56 or 62 mph)
- Power output
  - 1 hour: 3,300 or 4,680 kW (4,490 or 6,360 PS; 4,430 or 6,280 hp)
  - Continuous: 3,000 kW (4,080 PS; 4,020 hp)
- Tractive effort
  - Starting: 370 kN (83,000 lb_{f})
  - Continuous: 178 kN (40,000 lb_{f})
Career
- Retired: DB: 1988; DR: 1991; ÖBB: 1995
- Preserved: 15 (Germany); 18 (Austria)

The DRG Class E94 is an electric heavy freight locomotive built for Deutsche Reichsbahn from 1940, with the bulk of deliveries taking place in that year. It was a major evolution of the DRG Class E 93. Railway aficionados still call the type "Grünes Krokodil" (Green Crocodile) because of the resemblance to the Swiss locomotive nicknamed "Crocodile".

== Production ==
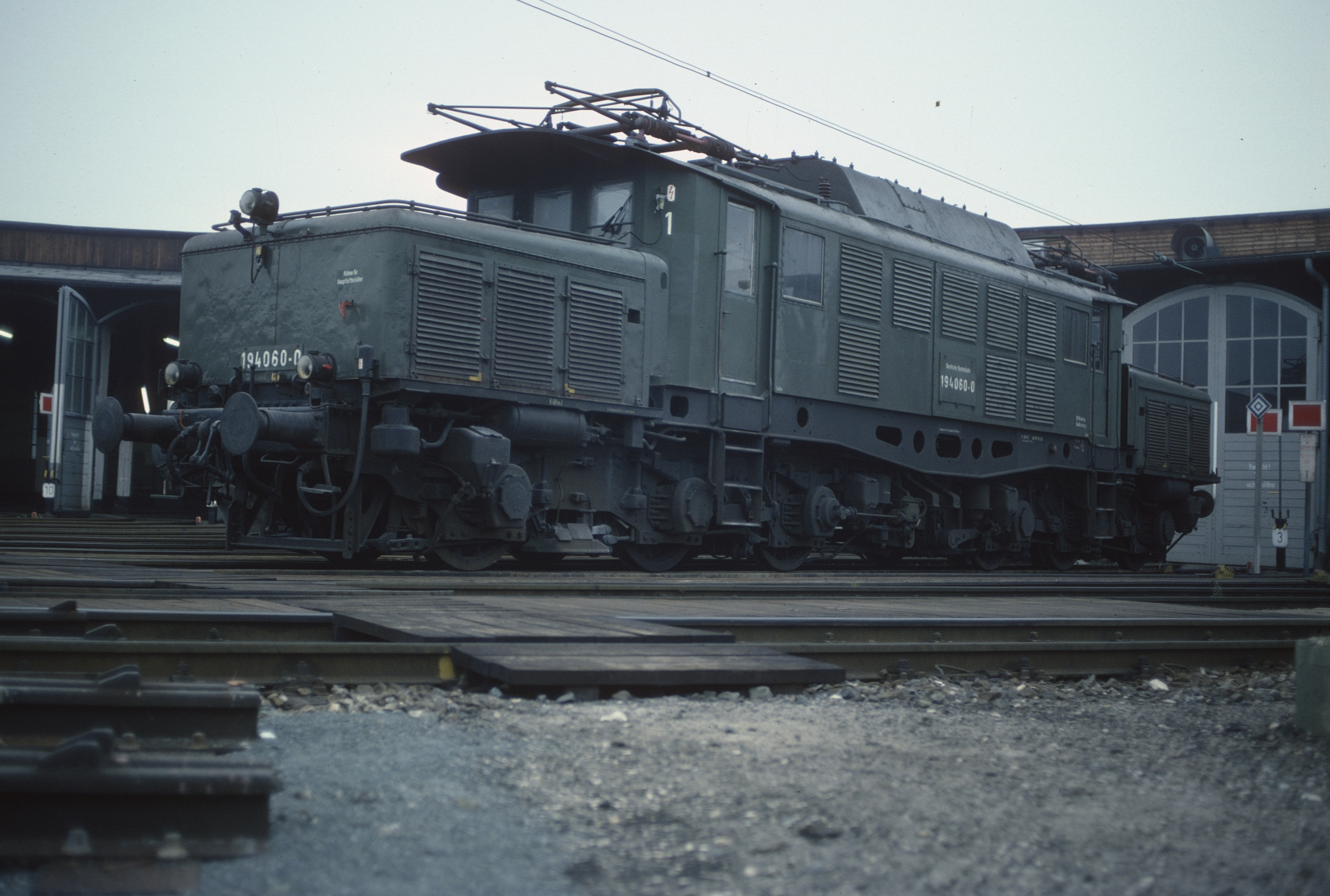
Deutsche Bundesbahn E 194 in 1985

146 units were built until the end of the Second World War, as it was considered important for the war effort. They were classified as KEL 2 during that time period.

After World War II, a further 49 units were ordered by the Deutsche Bundesbahn and delivered as late as 1957. The final 23 units had their power rating increased to 4,680 kW (6,280 hp). From 1968, the top speed of these locomotives was raised to 100 km/h (62 mph), and were reclassified as E 94.2, later Class 194.5, due to several technical differences.

== Transfers to ÖBB and DR ==
After the war, 44 units were placed under the authority of the Austrian Federal Railways (ÖBB). In 1952, the ÖBB ordered three complementary locos. In 1954, they were classified as class 1020.

Deutsche Reichsbahn refurbished 23 of the E 94 locomotives they retrieved from the Soviet occupation zone, and were put to work on heavy freight trains and occasionally express trains.
