= Rhaetian Railway Ge 6/6 I =

Locomotive class

Rhaetian Railway Ge 6/6 ^{I}
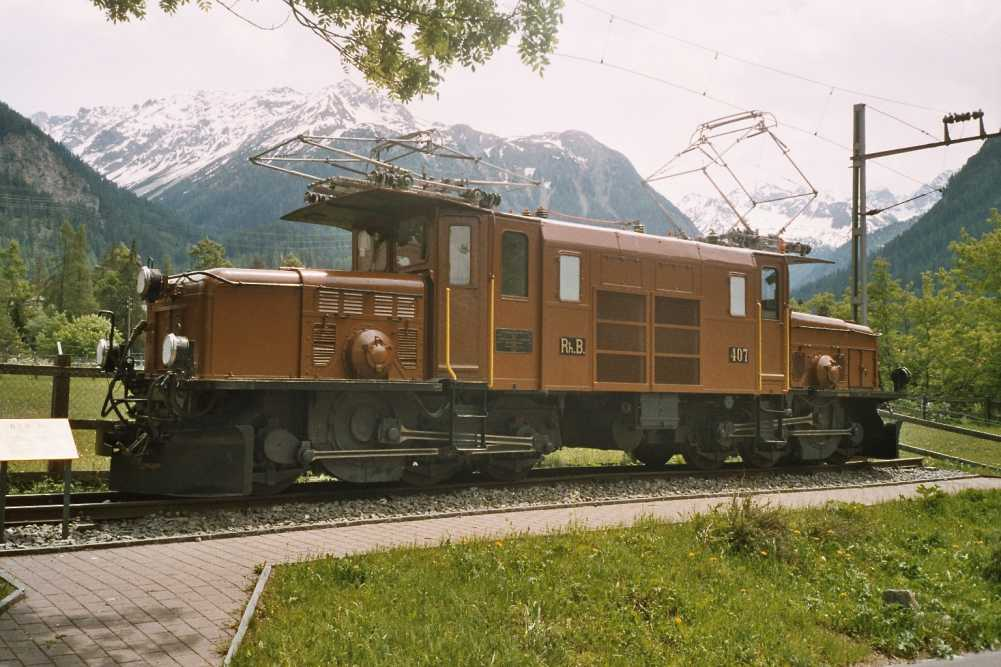
- Ge 6/6 ^{I} 407 has been on display since 1994 in the forecourt of Bergün/Bravuogn station.
Type and origin
- Power type: Electric
- Builder: SLM, BBC and MFO.
- Build date: 1921–1929
- Total produced: 15
Specifications
- Configuration
  - UIC: C′C′
- Gauge: 1,000 mm (3 ft 3 3/8 in)
- Length: 13,300 mm (43 ft 8 in)
- Width: 2,650 mm (8 ft 8 in)
- Loco weight: 65.9 tonnes (64.9 long tons; 72.6 short tons)
- Electric system/s: 11 kV 16.7 Hz Overhead
- Current pickup: Pantograph
- Traction motors: Two (type ELM 86/12)
- Transmission: jackshaft and side rods
Performance figures
- Maximum speed: 55 km/h (34 mph)
- Power output: 840 kW (1,130 hp)
- Tractive effort: 195 kN (43,840 lbf)
Career
- Operators: Rhaetian Railway
- Numbers: 401–415
- Nicknames: Rhaetian Crocodile
- Locale: Graubünden, Switzerland
- Retired: 1974–2008
- Current owner: Various
- Disposition: 2 still in service; 4 on static display

The Rhaetian Railway Ge 6/6 ^{I} is a class of metre gauge C′C′ electric locomotives operated by the Rhaetian Railway (RhB), which is the main railway network in the Canton of Graubünden, Switzerland.

The class is so named because it was the first class of locomotives of the Swiss locomotive and railcar classification type Ge 6/6 to be acquired by the Rhaetian Railway. According to that classification system, Ge 6/6 denotes a narrow gauge electric adhesion locomotive with a total of six axles, all of which are drive axles.

Due to their shape – they are similar in form to the SBB-CFF-FFS Crocodiles of the Gotthard Railway – the Ge 6/6 ^{I} locomotives have also collectively been nicknamed the Rhaetian Crocodiles by rail fans. Their internal working RhB designation is C-C. As with its standard-gauge counterpart, the Ge 6/6 is articulated, with a gear-driven Jackshaft between the two end axles of each unit, connected to the drive wheels by side rods.

== History ==
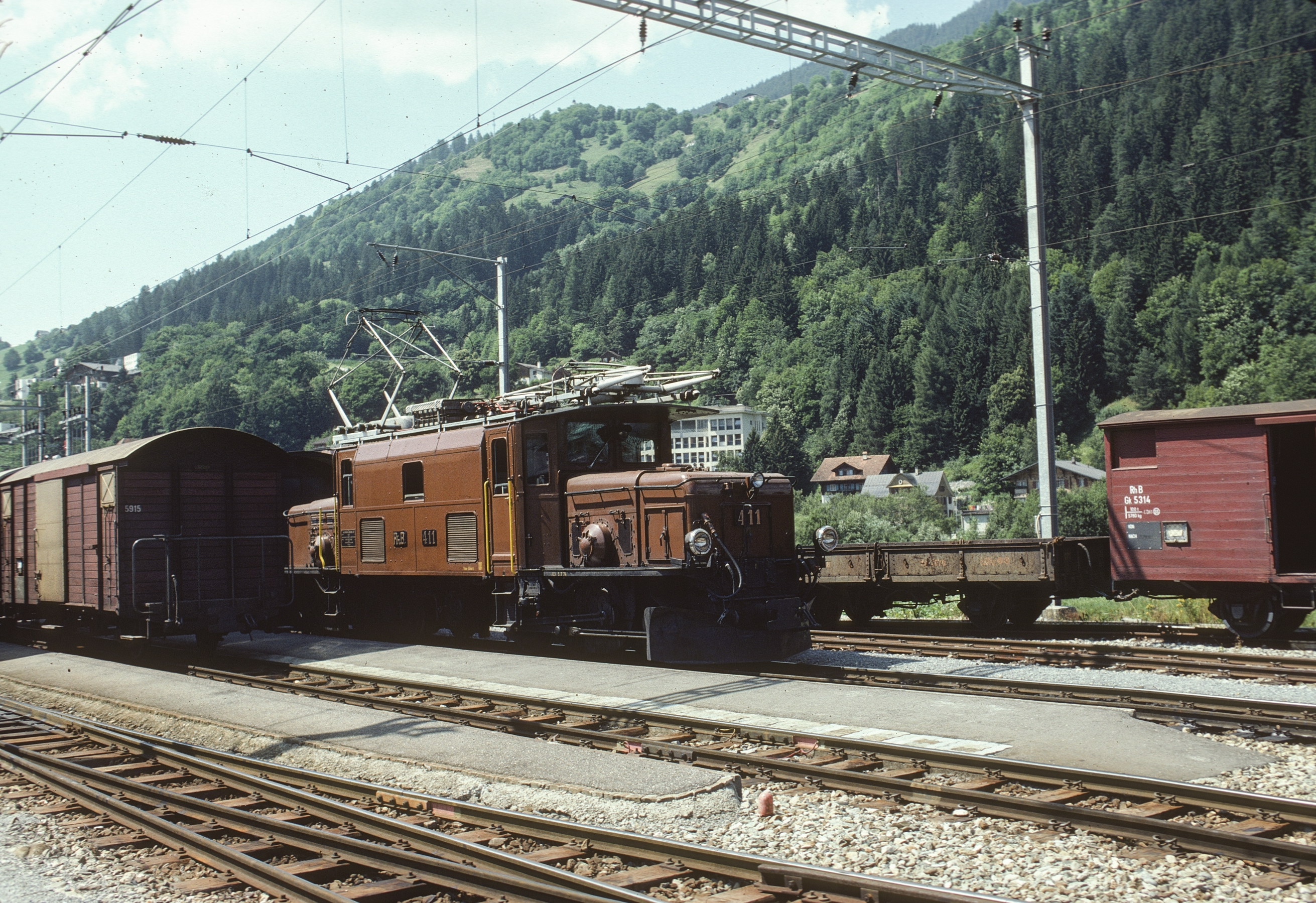
No. 411 sometime between 1982-1984

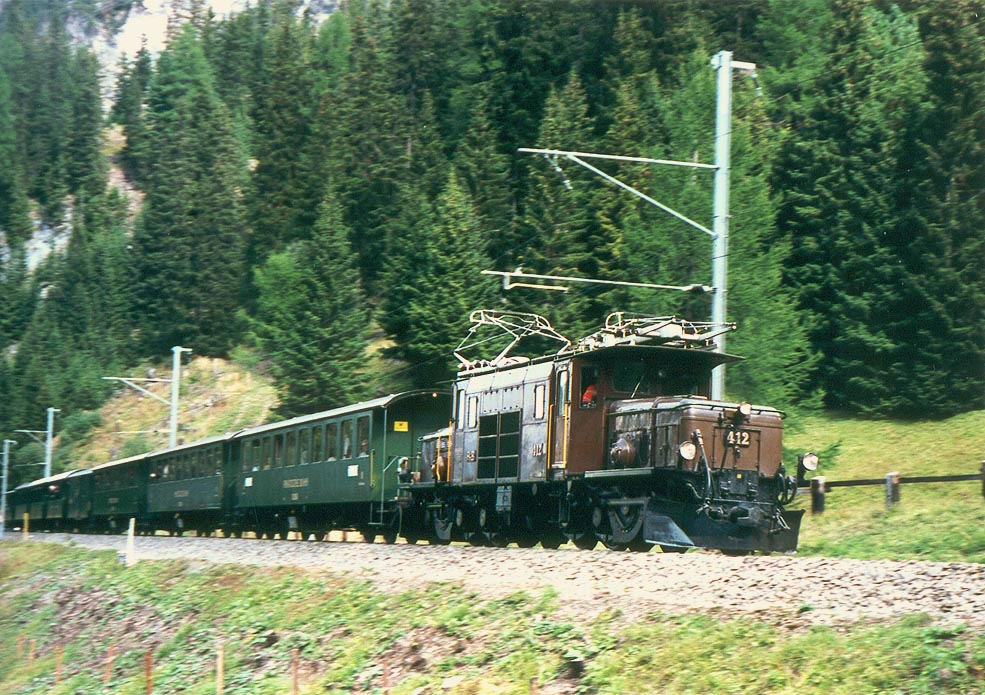
To this day, two remaining RhB Crocodiles, nos. 414 and 415, remain in service. Here is no. 412, which has since been broken up, with a heritage train near Preda on the Albula Railway.

Following the electrification of the Albula Railway in 1919, the Rhaetian Railway needed to acquire more electric locomotives. That need was met by the acquisition of six locomotives of a new class Ge 6/6, numbered 401 to 406. Manufacturers were Swiss Locomotive and Machine Works (SLM), Brown, Boveri & Cie (BBC) and Maschinenfabrik Oerlikon (MFO).

The introduction of electric operations on the line from Landquart to Davos Platz similarly necessitated the introduction of new locomotives more powerful than the Ge 2/4 and Ge 4/6 class locos already in service. In the wake of the first Ge 6/6 deliveries in 1921, further deliveries of locomotives in the class were made as follows: nos. 407 to 410 in 1922, nos. 411 and 412 in 1925, and nos. 413 to 415 in 1929.

With the 15 new Ge 6/6 locomotives, the Rhaetian Railway was able completely to replace the steam locomotives on its core network. Henceforth, the Ge 6/6s hauled the heavy and headline trains, including the Glacier Express.

The Ge 6/6s were 13.3 metres (44 ft) long, and weighed 66 tonnes (65 long tons; 73 short tons). Their power output reached 940 kilowatts (1,260 hp), and enabled them to reach a top speed of 55 kilometres per hour (34 mph).

The 15 Ge 6/6 locomotives placed into service with the numbers 401–415 carried and carry no names. The list set out below shows the year of commissioning, year of withdrawal, and the present whereabouts of each locomotive in the class.

Only in 1974, after more than 50 years of service, was the first example of the class withdrawn from service, due to an accident. However, as early as 1958 the newer locomotives of class Ge 6/6 ^{II} began slowly to force the Crocodiles into less demanding services. The Ge 4/4 ^{II} class, delivered from 1973, considerably accelerated this process, so that in 1984 no fewer than six Crocodiles were withdrawn. After no. 411 was put into storage in June 2001 following an accident — it is now on display in the Deutsches Museum, Munich — only nos. 412, 414 and 415 remained in operation. They were based in Landquart and Samedan.

== Preservation ==
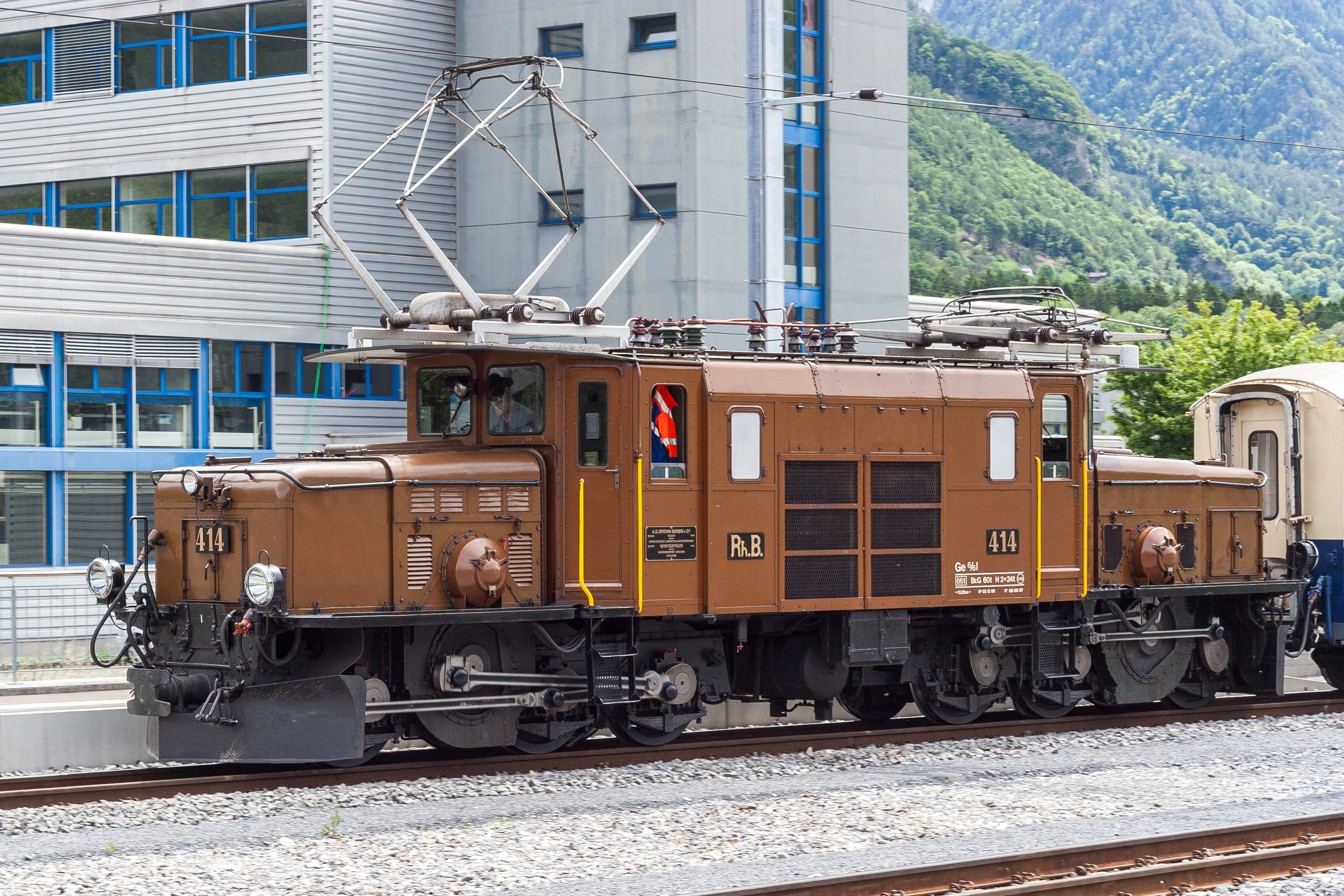
Ge 6/6 I N° 414 in Untervaz

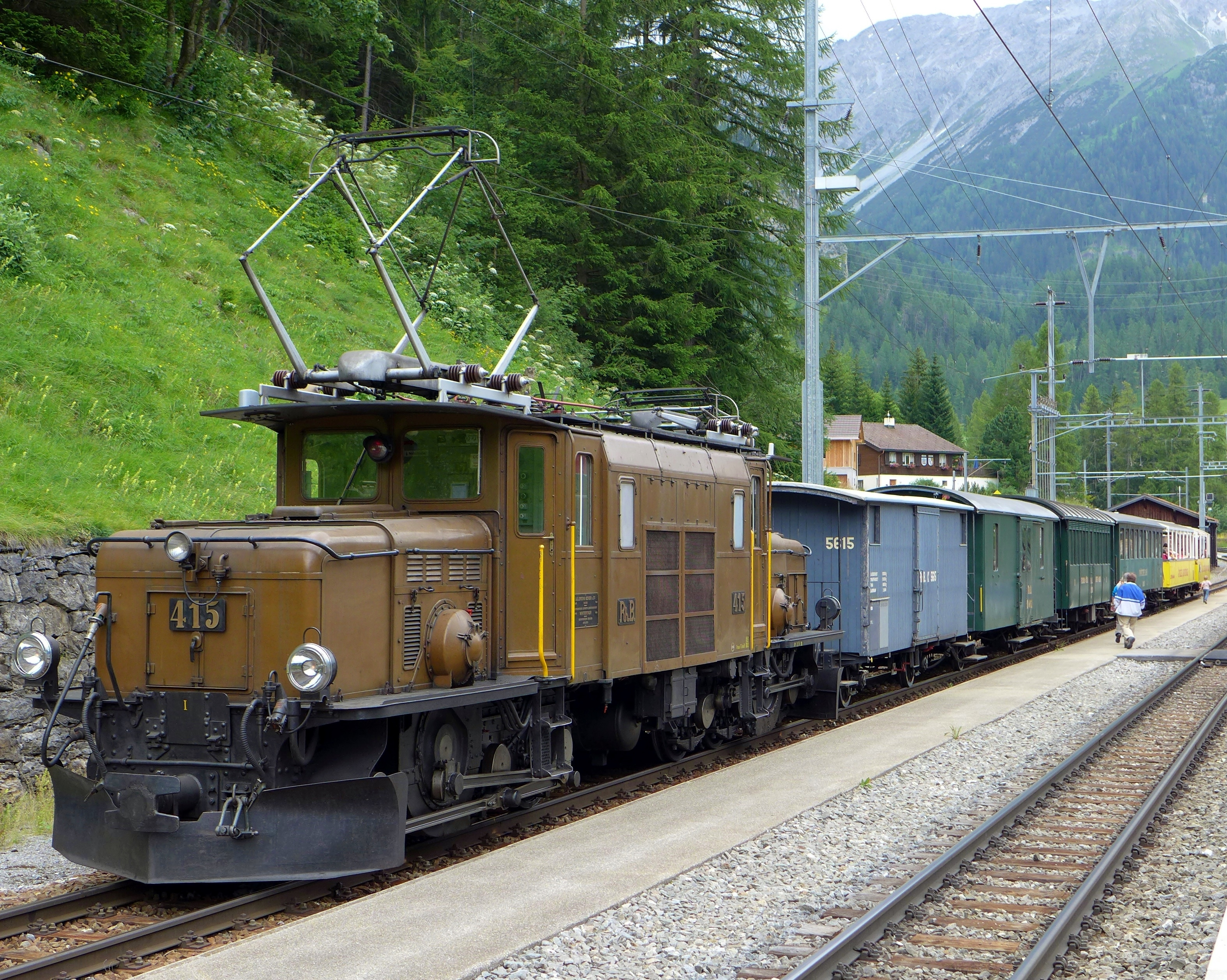
415 at Bergün-Bravuogn with a heritage train, 2014

Six locomotives of the Ge 6/6 ^{I} class are still in existence. Two of them are still in service with the Rhaetian Railway as operational locomotives.

Locomotive no. 402 is on display in the Swiss Transport Museum in Lucerne, no. 406 has been displayed in several places, and is currently at the Kerzers railway museum, and no. 407 is displayed outside Bergün/Bravuogn as part of Albula Railway Museum.

In 2006, on the occasion of the 75th anniversary of the Glacier Express, no. 412, which has since been broken up, was repainted in blue to match the Alpine Pullman Classic.

Nine examples of the class have been scrapped to date: no 401 was broken up in 1975 after an accident, and six others followed after the delivery of the second series of the Ge 4/4 ^{II} in 1984. As the last machines to disappear for the time being, no. 413 and 412 were used in 1996 and 2008 respectively as spare parts donors, and then scrapped.

== List of locomotives ==
List of Ge 6/6 ^{I} locomotives of the Rhaetian Railway
Traffic number	Commissioning	Withdrawal	Current whereabouts
401	30.06.1921	1974	Scrapped in 1975 after an accident.
402	11.07.1921	1985	On display in the Swiss Transport Museum in Lucerne.
403	19.07.1921	1984	Scrapped
404	30.07.1921	1984	Scrapped
405	19.08.1921	1984	Scrapped
406	16.09.1921	1984	Initially a static exhibit in the BBC Works, Oerlikon; from 1999 a memorial in ABB Works Pratteln; since 2005 on display in Kerzers railway museum.
407	20.07.1922	1985	Initially to Union Bank of Switzerland, Zürich; since 1994 memorial at Bergün/Bravuogn station.
408	12.08.1922	1984	Scrapped
409	29.08.1922	1984	Scrapped
410	24.10.1922	1984	Scrapped
411	26.10.1925	2000	Sent in 2001 after an accident to Deutsches Museum, Munich.
412	27.11.1925	2008	Withdrawn after gearbox failure; scrapped in 2008.
413	17.06.1929	1993	Withdrawn after gearbox failure; scrapped in 1996.
414	25.06.1929	--	Operational preserved locomotive
415	02.07.1929	--	Operational preserved locomotive

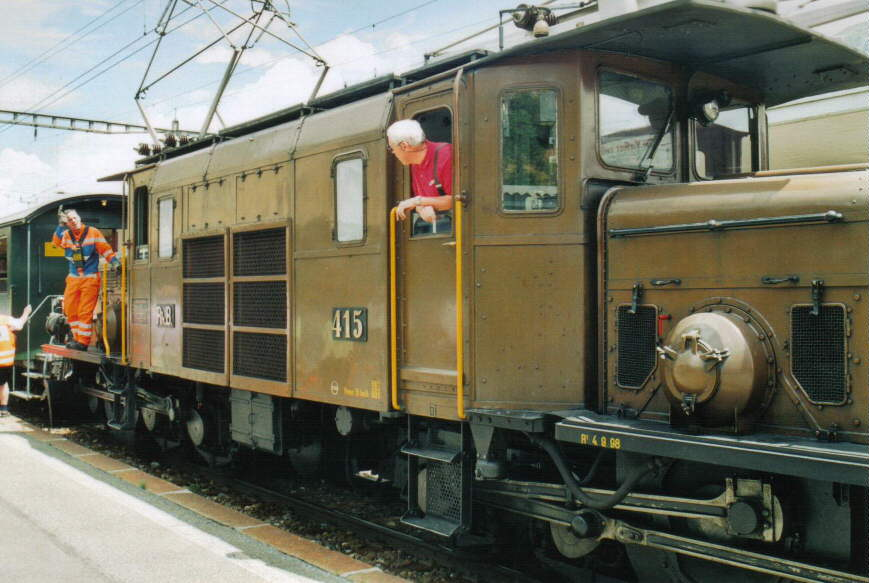
Ge 6/6^{I} 415 after the arrival on 28 June 2003 of a special train in Samedan.
