= Rhaetian Railway in the Albula / Bernina Landscapes =

UNESCO World Heritage Site
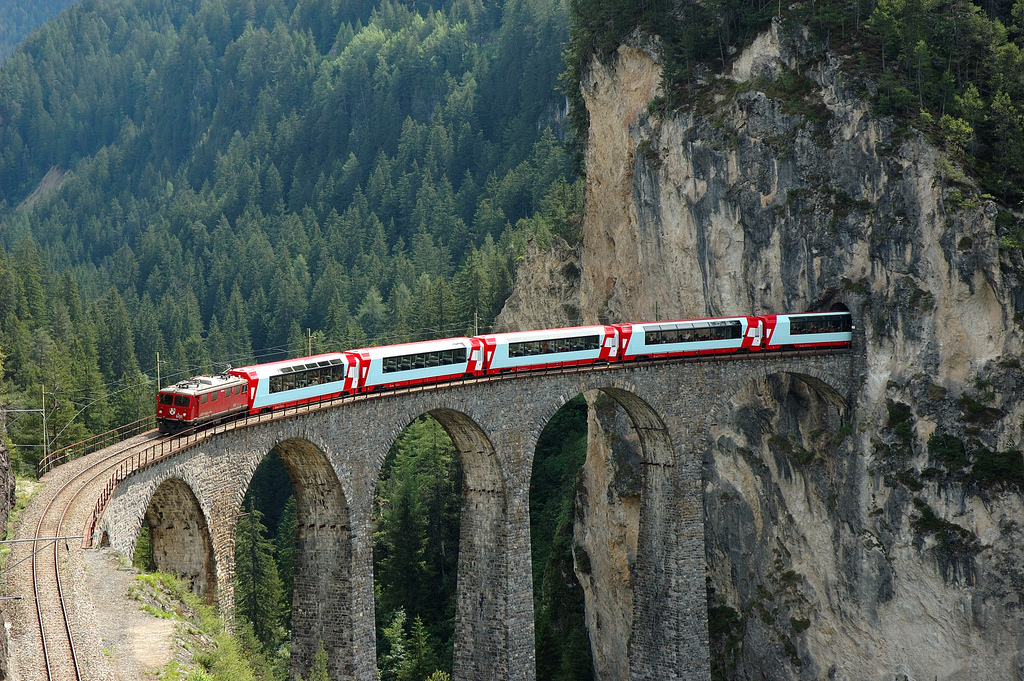
- The Glacier Express crossing the Landwasser Viaduct.

- Location within Europe
- Location: Switzerland (Graubünden) and Italy (Province of Sondrio)
- Criteria: Cultural: (ii), (iv)
- Reference: 1276
- Inscription: 2008 (32nd Session)
- Area: 152.42 ha (376.6 acres)
- Buffer zone: 109,385.9 ha (270,298 acres)
- Coordinates: 46°29′54″N 9°50′47″E

Rhaetian Railway in the Albula / Bernina Landscapes is a World Heritage Site comprising the Albula Railway and the Bernina Railway. The best known trains operating on this site are the Glacier Express and the Bernina Express.

== See also ==
- Rhaetian Railway
