= List of railway museums in Switzerland =

This is a list of railway museums in Switzerland.

== List ==
- Albula Railway Museum
- Bahn der internationalen Rheinregulierung (IRR)
- Blonay–Chamby Museum Railway (BC)
- Dampfbahn-Verein Zürcher Oberland (DVZO)
- Furka Steam Railway (Dampfbahn Furka-Bergstrecke or DFB)
- Schinznacher Baumschulbahn (SchBB)
- Swiss Transport Museum, Lucerne
- Zürcher Museums-Bahn, Zürich

== See also ==
- List of heritage railways and funiculars in Switzerland
- List of museums in Switzerland
