= DRG Class E 93 =

DRG Class E93
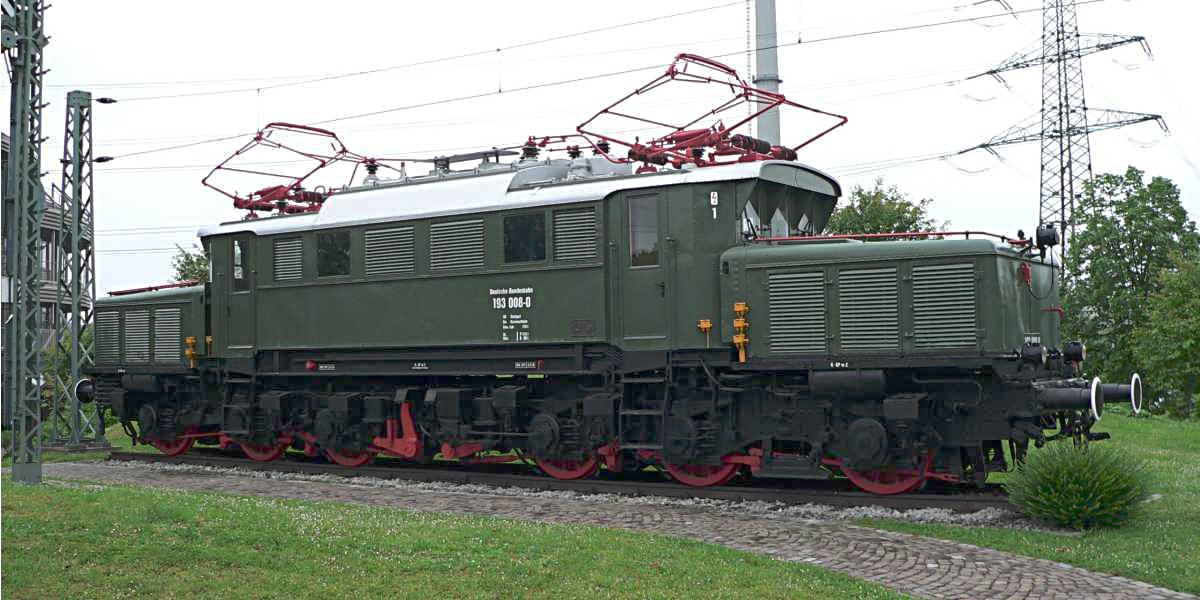
Type and origin
- Power type: Electric
- Builder: AEG, BBC
- Build date: 1933–37
- Total produced: 18
Specifications
- Configuration
  - UIC: Co′Co′
- Gauge: 1,435 mm (4 ft 8 1/2 in)
- Length: 17,700 mm (58 ft 0.9 in)
- Adhesive weight: 19.7 t (19.4 long tons; 21.7 short tons)
- Loco weight: 117.6 t (115.7 long tons; 129.6 short tons)
- Electric system/s: 15 kV 16 2/3 Hz AC Catenary
- Current pickup(s): Pantograph
Performance figures
- Maximum speed: 70 km/h (43 mph)
- Power output: 2,502 kW (3,355 hp)
- Tractive effort: Continuous: 198 kN (45,000 lb_{f}), Starting: 360 kN (81,000 lb_{f})
Career
- Delivered: 1933

The DRG Class E93 is an electric heavy freight locomotive built by AEG for Deutsche Reichsbahn in 1933. Its development was triggered by the electrification of the Geislinger Steige, a steep grade of the mainline railroad between Stuttgart and Ulm, which had been electrified in 1933 and required powerful new freight locomotives to overcome it with heavy freight trains. Its successor is the DRG Class E 94.

== Production ==
The 18 ordered units were delivered between 1933 and 1937.

== Appearance ==
The external appearance superficially resembles a Swiss crocodile but the German locomotive differs in that the axles are individually powered and the body is not articulated.
