= Rhaetian Railway Ge 4/6 =

Swiss electric locomotive

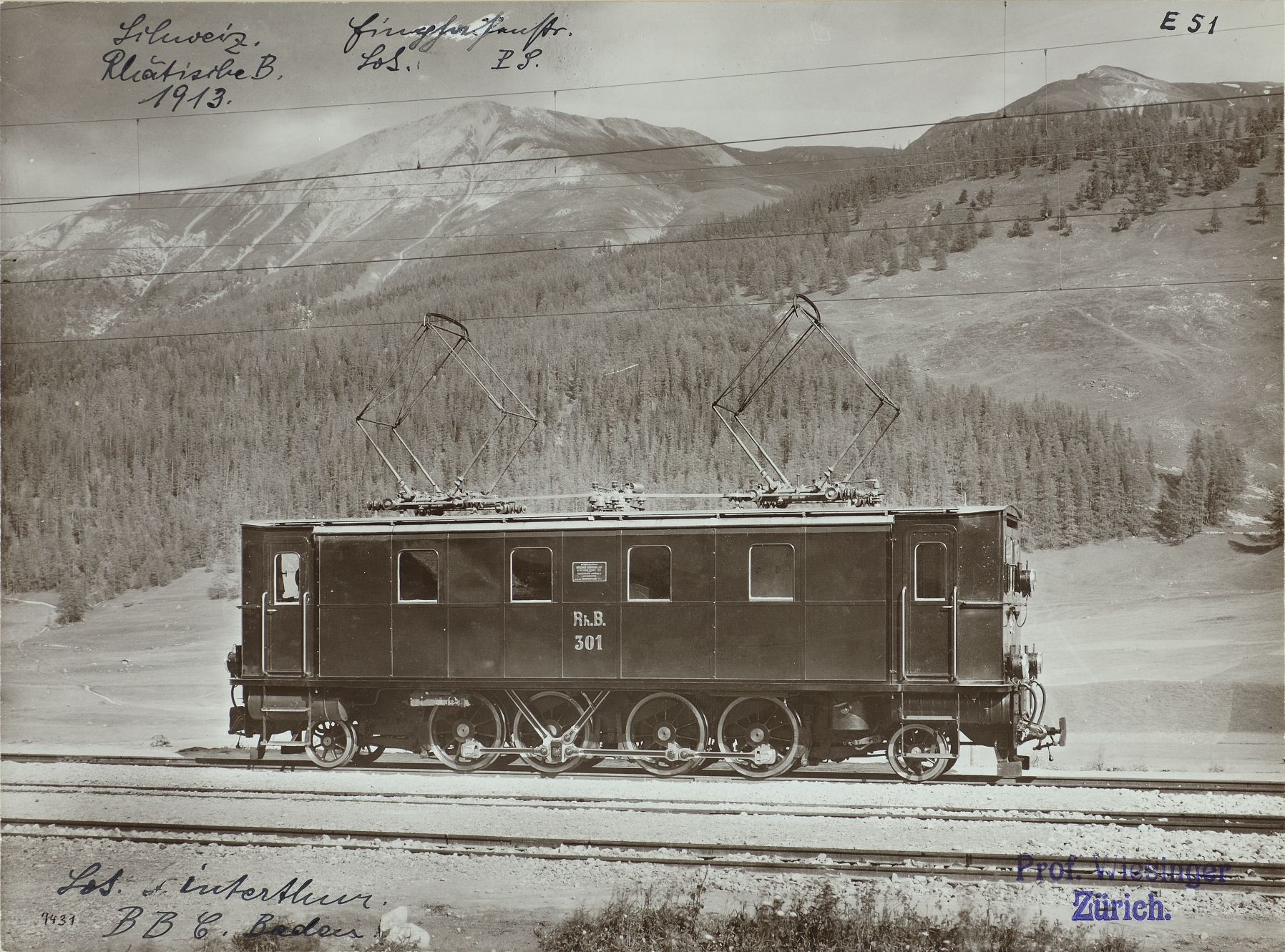
- RhB Ge 4/6 No. 301
Type and origin
- Power type: Electric
- Builder: Swiss Locomotive and Machine Works
- Build date: 1912–1918
- Total produced: 8
Specifications
- Configuration
  - UIC: 1′D1′
- Gauge: 1,000 mm (3 ft 3 3/8 in)
- Leading dia.: 710 mm (2 ft 4 in)
- Driver dia.: 1,070 mm (3 ft 6 in)
- Trailing dia.: 710 mm (2 ft 4 in)
- Electric system/s: 11 kV 16.7 Hz AC Overhead
- Current pickup: Pantograph
Performance figures
- Maximum speed: 50 km/h (31 mph)
- Power output: 440 or 588 kW (590 or 790 hp)
Career
- Operators: Rhaetian Railway
- Numbers: 301–302, 351–355, 391
- Locale: Graubünden, Switzerland
- Retired: 1966–1984
- Current owner: Rhaetian Railway
- Disposition: One still operational, one static display

The Rhaetian Railway Ge 4/6 was an eight member class of metre gauge 1′D1′ electric locomotives formerly operated by the Rhaetian Railway (RhB), which is the main railway network in the Canton of Graubünden, Switzerland.

The class was so named under the Swiss locomotive and railcar classification system. According to that system, Ge 4/6 denotes a narrow gauge electric adhesion locomotive with a total of six axles, four of which are drive axles.

Two members of the class are now preserved, one of them in operational condition.

== History ==
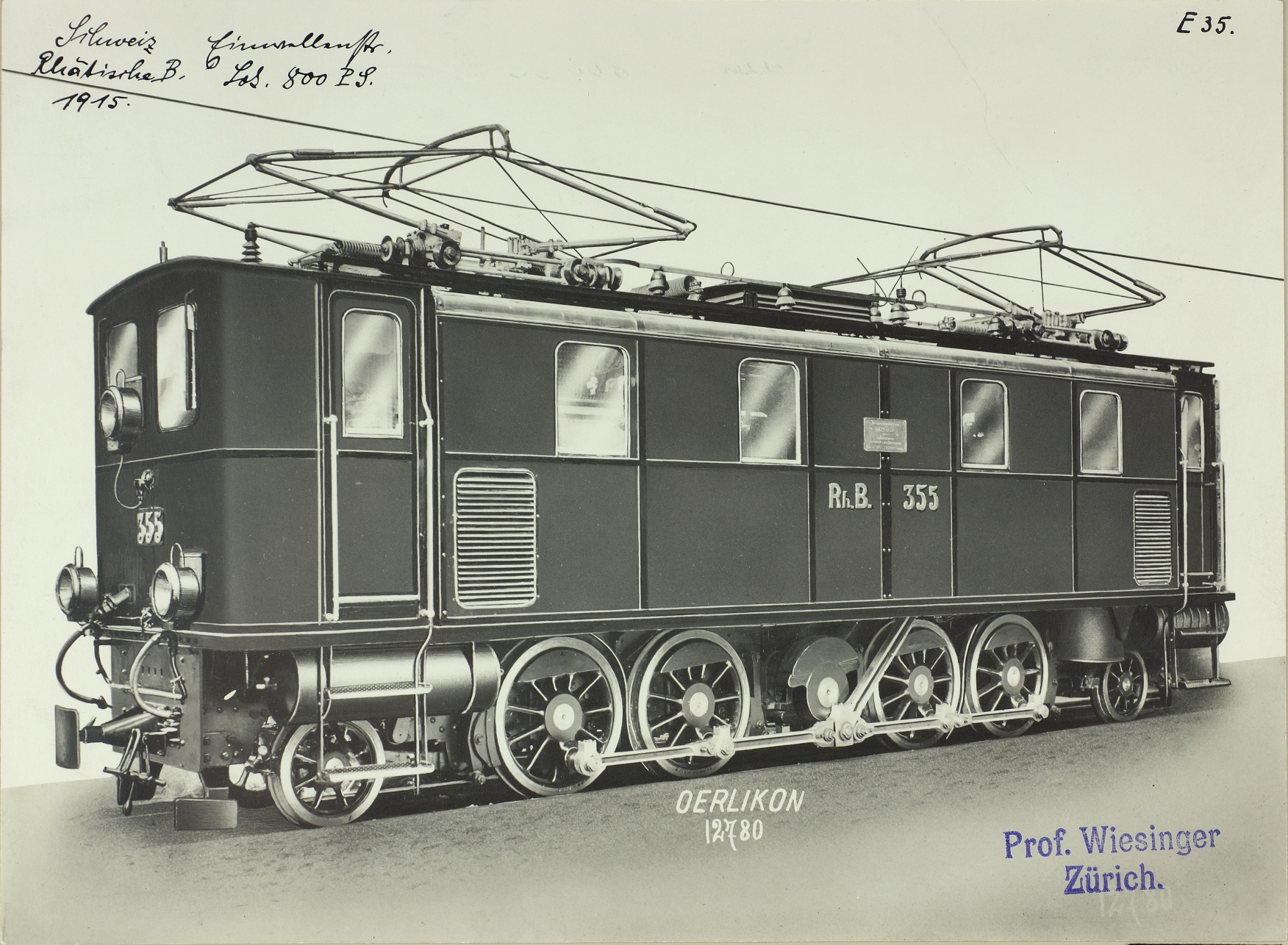
No. 355

For the opening of the Samedan to Scuol railway line in 1913, the Rhaetian Railway needed a class of powerful electric locomotives. As the AC electric power supply technology installed along that line was still in its infancy, several manufacturers of electrical equipment were commissioned to build prototype electrical systems, to help develop an optimum locomotive. The mechanical components of all the locomotives fitted with these systems were fabricated by the Swiss Locomotive and Machine Works (SLM).

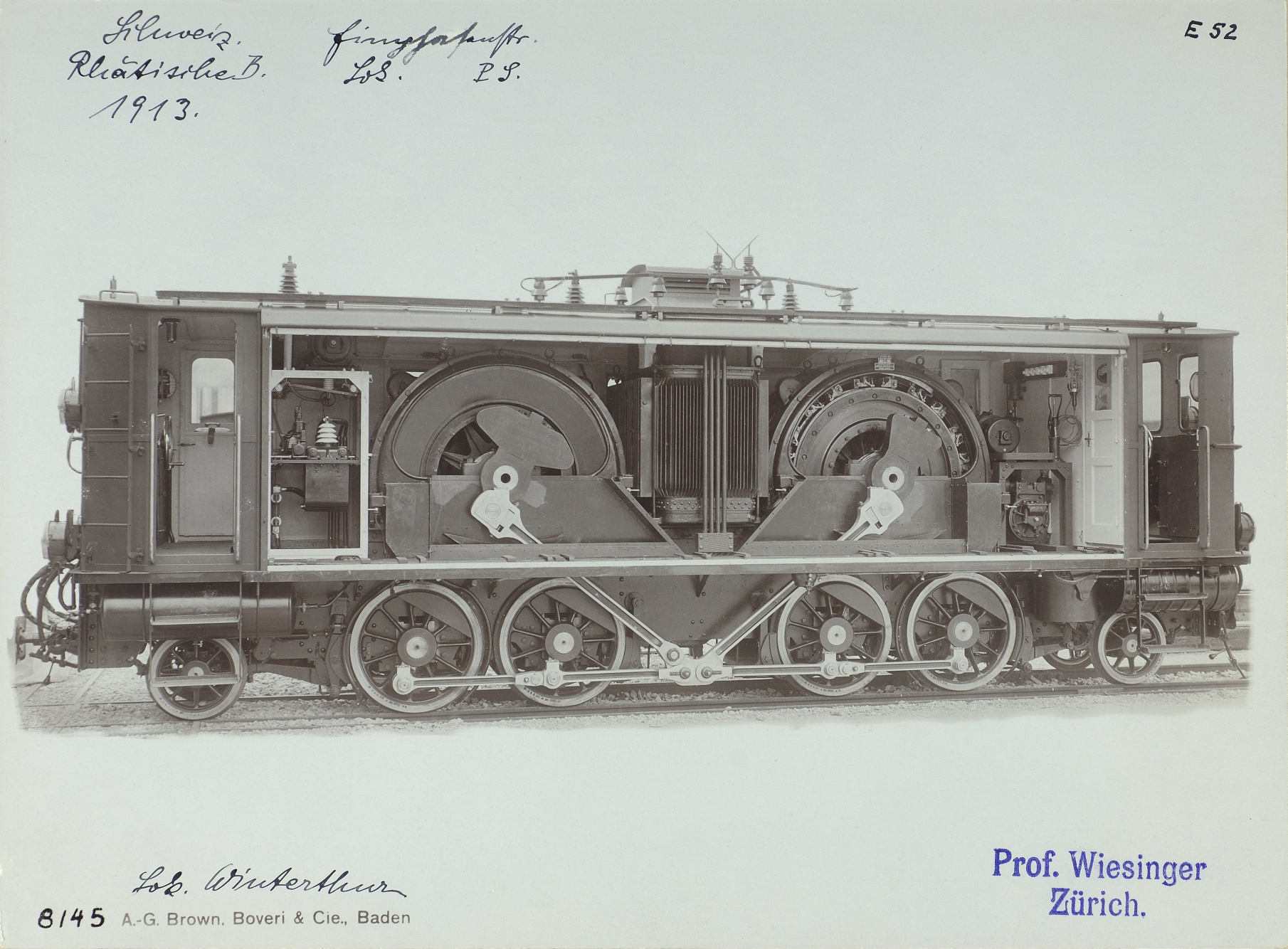
Exhibition locomotive with cutaway motor compartment.

The first Ge 4/6 locomotive, no. 351, arrived in Graubünden in December 1912, with electrical equipment manufactured by Maschinenfabrik Oerlikon (MFO). It was thus the first electric locomotive acquired by the Rhaetian Railway. An identical sister locomotive, numbered 352, followed in February 1913. Later that year, a third Ge 4/6, numbered 391 and manufactured by SLM and AEG, joined the fleet. The last Ge 4/6 to be manufactured for the time being was no. 301, which was built by Brown, Boveri & Cie (BBC), and entered service in June 1913.

Several years later, in 1918, the Rhaetian Railway acquired another Ge 4/6, no. 302. That locomotive had been constructed by BBC in 1914 on its own account, as an exhibition piece. In the meantime, trial runs had shown that the MFO electrical equipment was the best suited to the needs of the Rhaetian Railway. A sub-series of a further three locomotives had therefore been ordered with slightly increased power ratings. They had been numbered 353 to 355, and had joined the fleet in 1914.

== Service and withdrawal ==
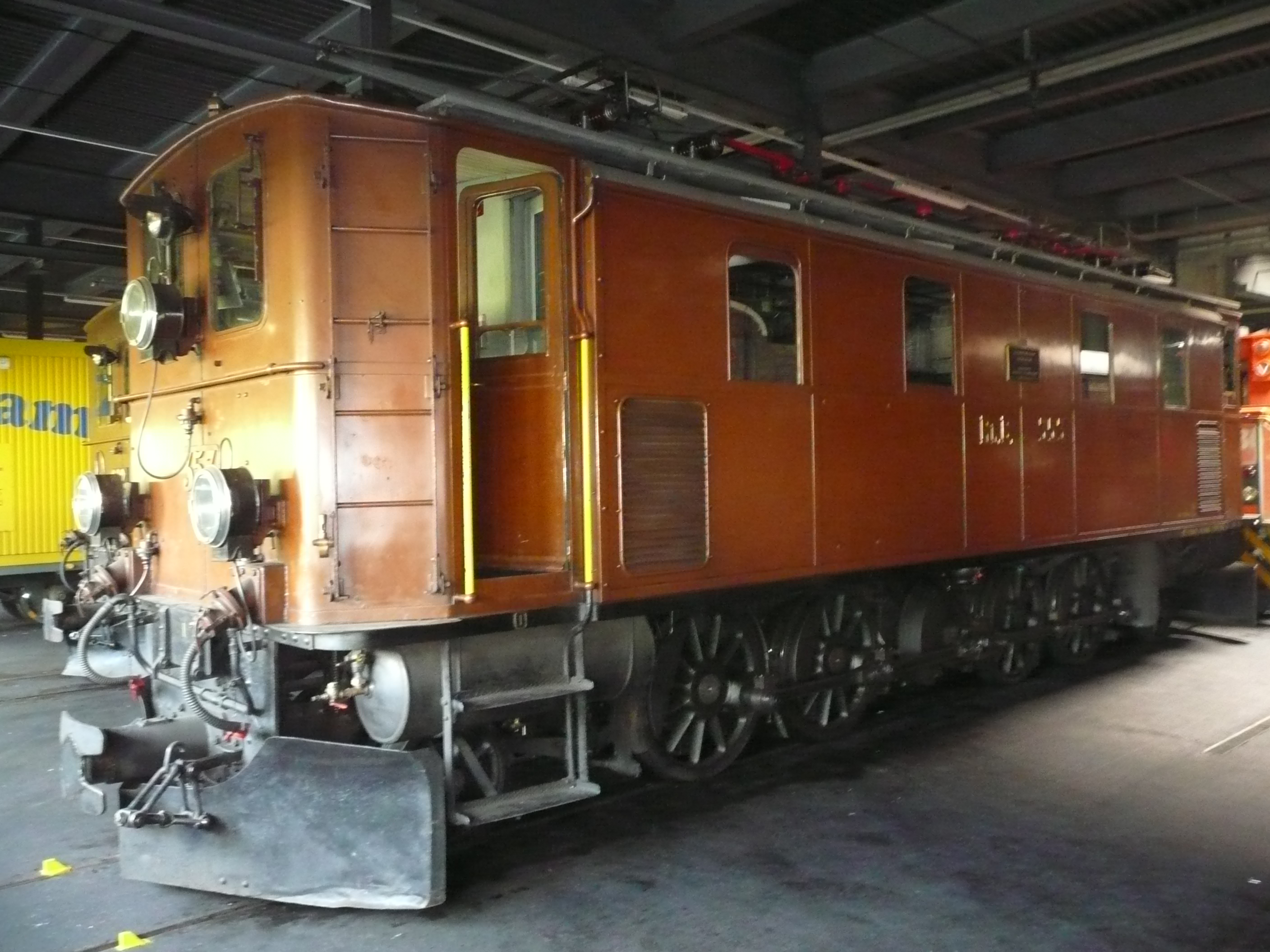
Ge 4/6 No. 353 inside Samedan locomotive depot

Further acquisitions of locomotives were made impossible by the onset of World War I, and therefore no more Ge 4/6s were built. Only in 1921 did any additional locomotives arrive at the Rhaetian Railway, in the form of the more powerful Ge 6/6 ^{I} class. From then onwards, the Ge 4/6s were used in light and medium duty passenger and goods traffic over the whole of the Rhaetian Railway's core network.

The first member of the Ge 4/6 class to be retired from service was no. 301, which was withdrawn in 1966 to be used as a donor of spare parts. No 301 was scrapped in 1971, and no. 302 followed five years later. The delivery of the first Ge 4/4 ^{II} in 1973 meant the end for nos. 351 and 352. Nos. 354 and 355 followed them to the scrap yard in 1982 and 1984 respectively, while no. 353 was retained as a preserved locomotive. Meanwhile, the AEG locomotive, no. 391, had been withdrawn as early as 1973, but had remained at the Rhaetian Railway until 1980. It was then returned to AEG, and has since been put on display at the German Museum of Technology (Berlin).

Preserved locomotive 353, which celebrated its 90th birthday in 2004, remains in regular service on heritage trains.

== List of locomotives ==
List of the Ge 4/6 locomotives of the Rhaetian Railway
Traffic number	Commissioning	Manufacturer	Power output	Withdrawal	Current whereabouts
301	09.06.1913	SLM/BBC	440 kW	1966	Scrapped November 1971
302	29.08.1918	SLM/BBC	588 kW	1971	Scrapped December 1976
351	18.12.1912	SLM/MFO	440 kW	1973	Scrapped January 1977
352	07.02.1913	SLM/MFO	440 kW	1973	Scrapped February 1977
353	24.07.1914	SLM/MFO	588 kW	--	Heritage loco, Samedan depot
354	06.10.1914	SLM/MFO	588 kW	1984	Scrapped December 1984
355	21.12.1914	SLM/MFO	588 kW	1984	Scrapped August 1984
391	16.03.1913	SLM/AEG	440 kW	1973	1980 to AEG, heritage loco DTMB

== See also ==
- History of rail transport in Switzerland
- Rail transport in Switzerland
