= Crocodile (locomotive) =

Type of electric locomotive

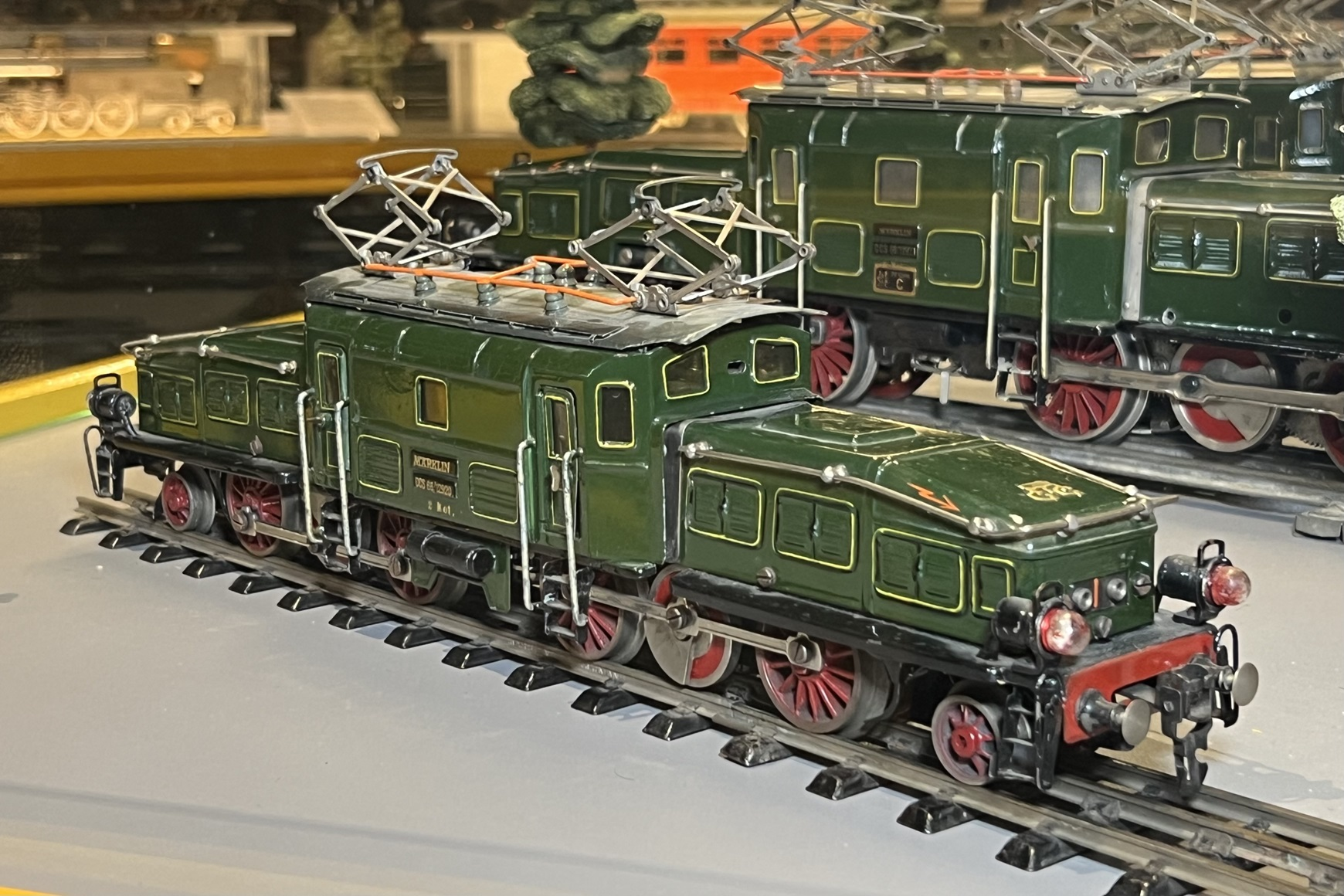
Origin of the term crocodile locomotive, Märklin 0-gauge item CCS 66/12920, in the Technorama, 2024

Crocodile (German Krokodil) electric locomotives are so called because they have long "noses" at each end, reminiscent of the snout of a crocodile (see also Steeplecab). These contain the motors and drive axles, and are connected by an articulated center section. The center section usually contains the crew compartments, pantographs and transformer.

The first evidence of the nickname crocodile locomotive refers to the green Märklin model railway locomotives in gauge 0, item CCS 66/12920, as well as in gauge 1, item CCS 66/12921, which snake through the curves like a reptile when running through switch roads and counter curves, and are first referred to as such in the Märklin catalogue of 1933/1934. They are a reproduction of the Ce 6/8^{II} and Ce 6/8^{III} freight locomotives of the Swiss Federal Railways (SBB), which were put into service starting in 1919.

Sometimes the term is also used for locomotives of a similar design.

== History ==
=== Switzerland ===
==== Standard gauge ====
===== SBB Class Ce 6/8 =====
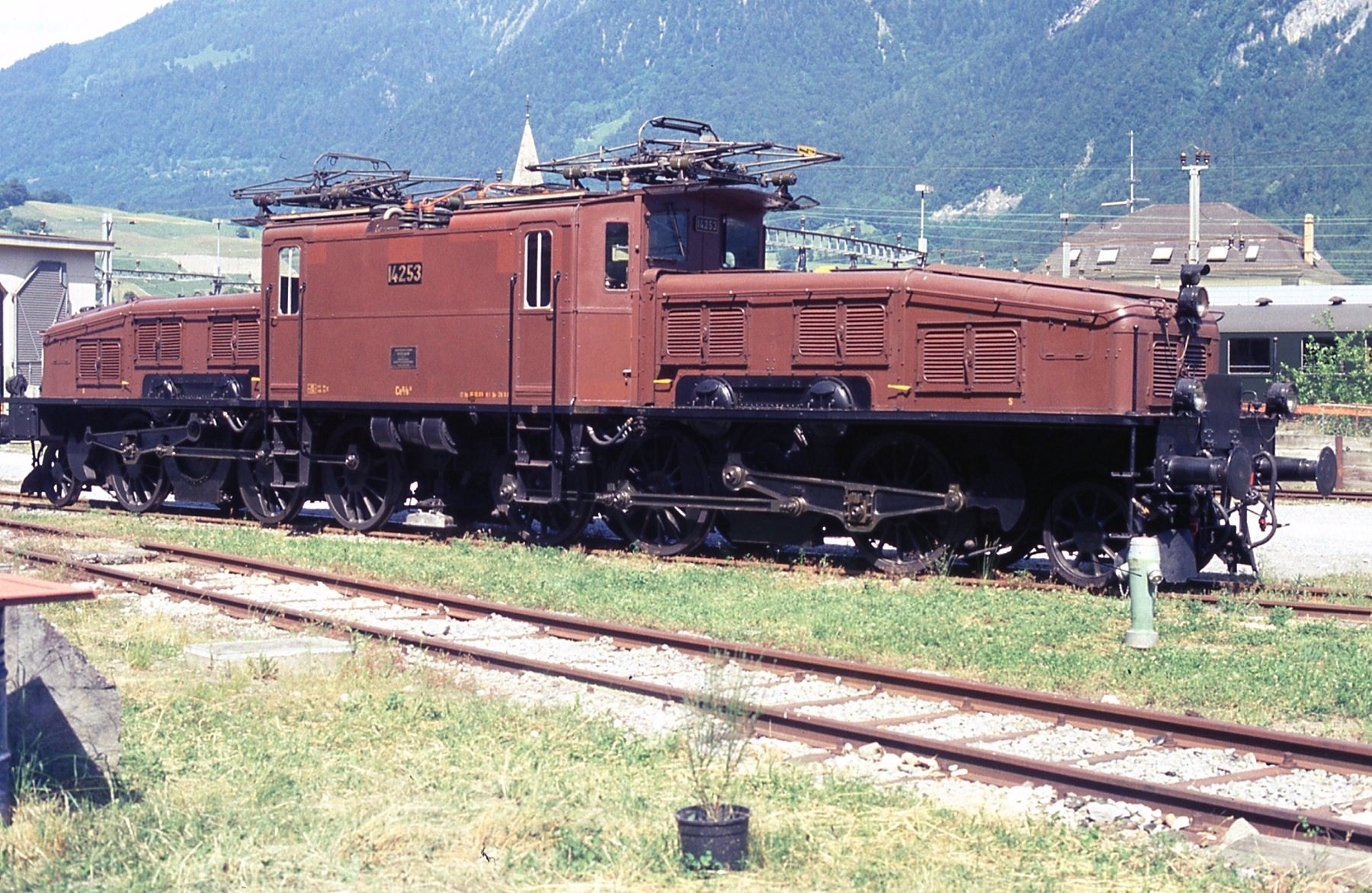
SBB Ce 6/8^{II} crocodile

The production "Crocodiles" were the series Ce 6/8^{II} and Ce 6/8^{III} locomotives of the Swiss Federal Railways (SBB), built between 1919 and 1927. There were 33 class Ce 6/8^{II} and 18 class Ce 6/8^{III}, making a total of 51 locomotives. These locomotives were developed for pulling heavy goods trains on the steep tracks of the Gotthardbahn from Lucerne to Chiasso, including the Gotthard Tunnel. (A prototype Ce 6/8 class locomotive, SBB Ce 6/8^{I} number 14201, lacks an articulated body and the crocodile’s characteristic nose.)

The electric motors available at the time were large and had to be body-mounted above the plane of the axles, but flexibility was required to negotiate the tight curves on the Alpine routes and tunnels. An articulated design, with two powered nose units bridged with a pivoting center section containing cabs and the heavy transformer, met both requirements and gave excellent visibility from driving cabs mounted safely away from any collision. The two motors in each nose unit were geared to a jackshaft between the drive axles farthest from the cab (SBB Ce 6/8^{II}) or farthest from the end (SBB Ce 6/8^{III}), with side rods carrying the power to the drivers. These locomotives, sometimes called the "Swiss Crocodile" or "SBB Crocodile", were highly successful and served until 1982. The German model railway manufacturer Märklin published a book about their history in 1984. Nine out of 51 total produced have survived, but only three are still in operation as preserved historical locomotives in Switzerland.

===== SBB Class Be 6/8 =====
Between 1942 and 1947, thirteen members of class Ce 6/8^{II} were upgraded with more powerful motors, to allow a higher top speed, and these became class Be 6/8^{II}. This required raising the jackshaft above the plane of the axles, necessitating a more complex system of side rods. In 1956, all eighteen members of class Ce 6/8^{III} were upgraded and became class Be 6/8^{III}.

===== SBB Class De 6/6 =====
Three Class De 6/6 electric locomotives, numbered 15301–15303, were built in 1926 for the Seetalbahn line. They had a shorter snouts than the Ce 6/8 class and a single pantograph but were articulated similarly. One is preserved since their retirement from service.

==== Narrow gauge ====
===== RhB Class Ge 6/6 I =====
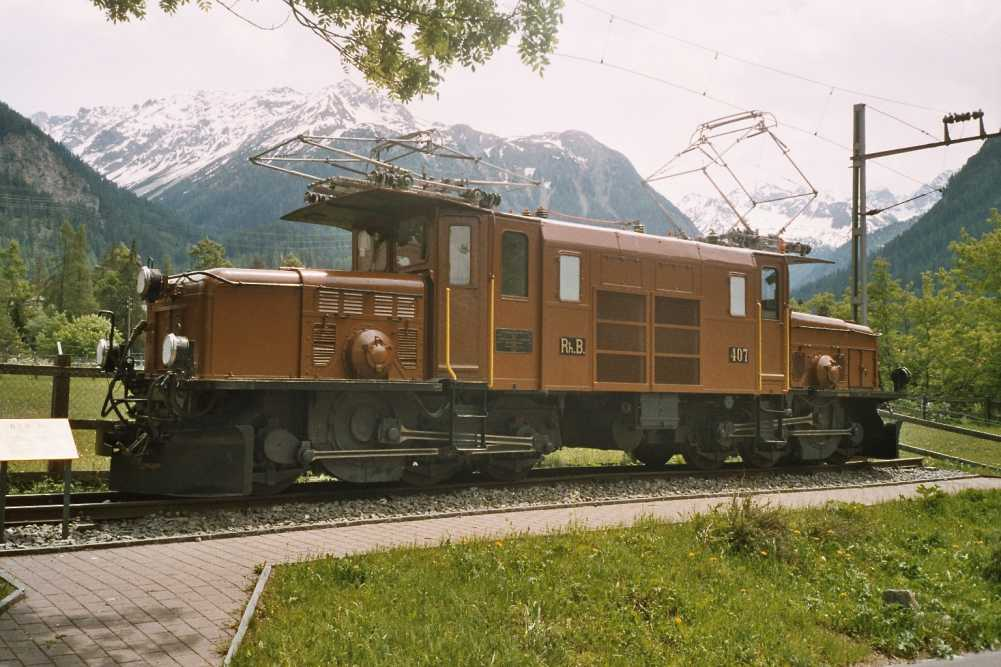
Rhaetian Crocodile in Bergün

As well as standard gauge Crocodiles, there are also narrow gauge versions. The best known are the Rhaetian Railway (RhB)'s metre gauge locomotives of class Ge 6/6^{I}, the Rhaetian Crocodile. Several of these still run on passenger trains on special occasions. They are also used on freight trains in busy periods.

===== RhB Class Ge 4/4 =====
The Bernina Railway (later merged with the RhB) also built a single Crocodile type, the Ge 4/4 No. 182, nicknamed the "Bernina Crocodile". This locomotive survives and was restored to operating condition by the CLUB 1889 preservation group during 2000-2010.

===== BVZ Class HGe 4/4 I and YSteC Ge 4/4 =====
Two other Swiss narrow-gauge railways also have locomotives nicknamed Crocodiles; the BVZ Zermatt-Bahn (BVZ) (which merged with the Furka Oberalp Bahn (FO) in 2003 to form the Matterhorn-Gotthard-Bahn) uses series HGe 4/4^{I} , known as the Zermatt crocodile, while the Chemin de Fer Yverdon-Ste. Croix owns a solitary class Ge 4/4 No. 21. Neither of these locomotive types have an articulated body, which leads some railfans to nickname them "false crocodiles".

=== Austria ===
Very similar locomotives were used in Austria as Austrian Federal Railways (Österreichische Bundesbahn) classes ÖBB 1089 and ÖBB 1189, and are often known as "Austrian Crocodiles".

=== France ===
The French SNCF 25 kV AC locomotives of classes CC 14000 and CC 14100, used mainly for iron ore trains on the Valenciennes-Thionville line, have sometimes been called "crocodiles", although more commonly "flatirons". They are different from the Swiss crocodiles in that they are not articulated, but are a single long steeplecab or 'monocabine' with a bogie beneath each end.

=== Germany ===
The German classes E 93 and E 94, also used by the ÖBB as series 1020, are sometimes called "German crocodiles". They are sometimes nicknamed "Alligators", instead, because of their broader, shorter snouts.

=== India ===
Crocodile locomotives were also used in India. These locomotives, of series WCG-1, were used from 1928 between Bombay and Pune, and were all built to the Indian broad gauge of 5 ft 6 in (1676 mm). The first 10 locomotives were built by Swiss Locomotive and Machine Works. Vulcan Foundry of Great Britain constructed a further 31 examples for this line.

=== Spain ===
Ten locomotives similar to the ones operated in Switzerland and Austria were known as cocodrilo (Spanish for 'crocodile'). They were operated by Ferrocarriles Vascongados and its successor companies from 1928 to 1999.

== Other Crocodile-like locomotives ==
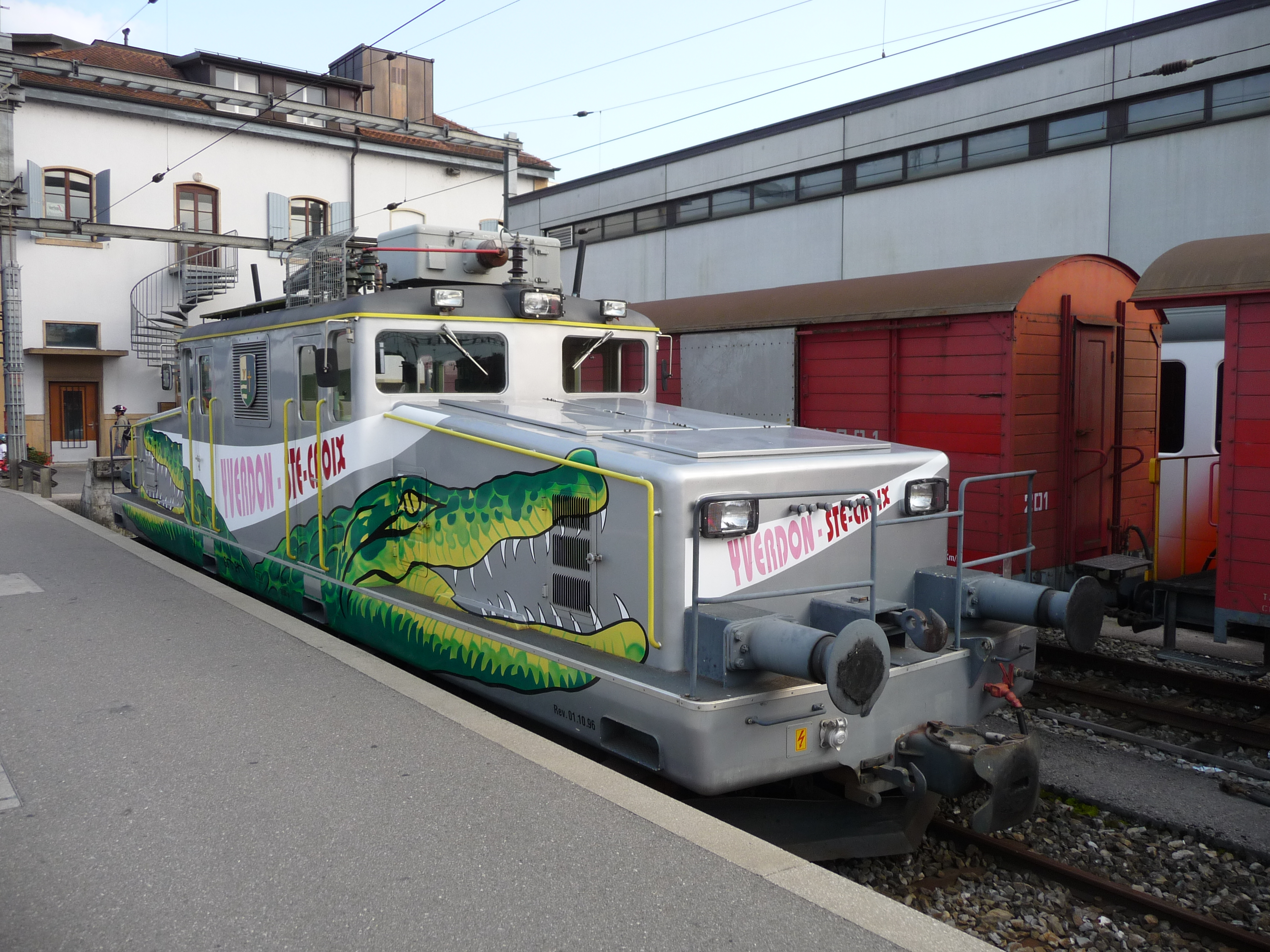
Bo-Bo YSteC Ge 4/4 steeplecab in Yverdon-les-Bains, Switzerland

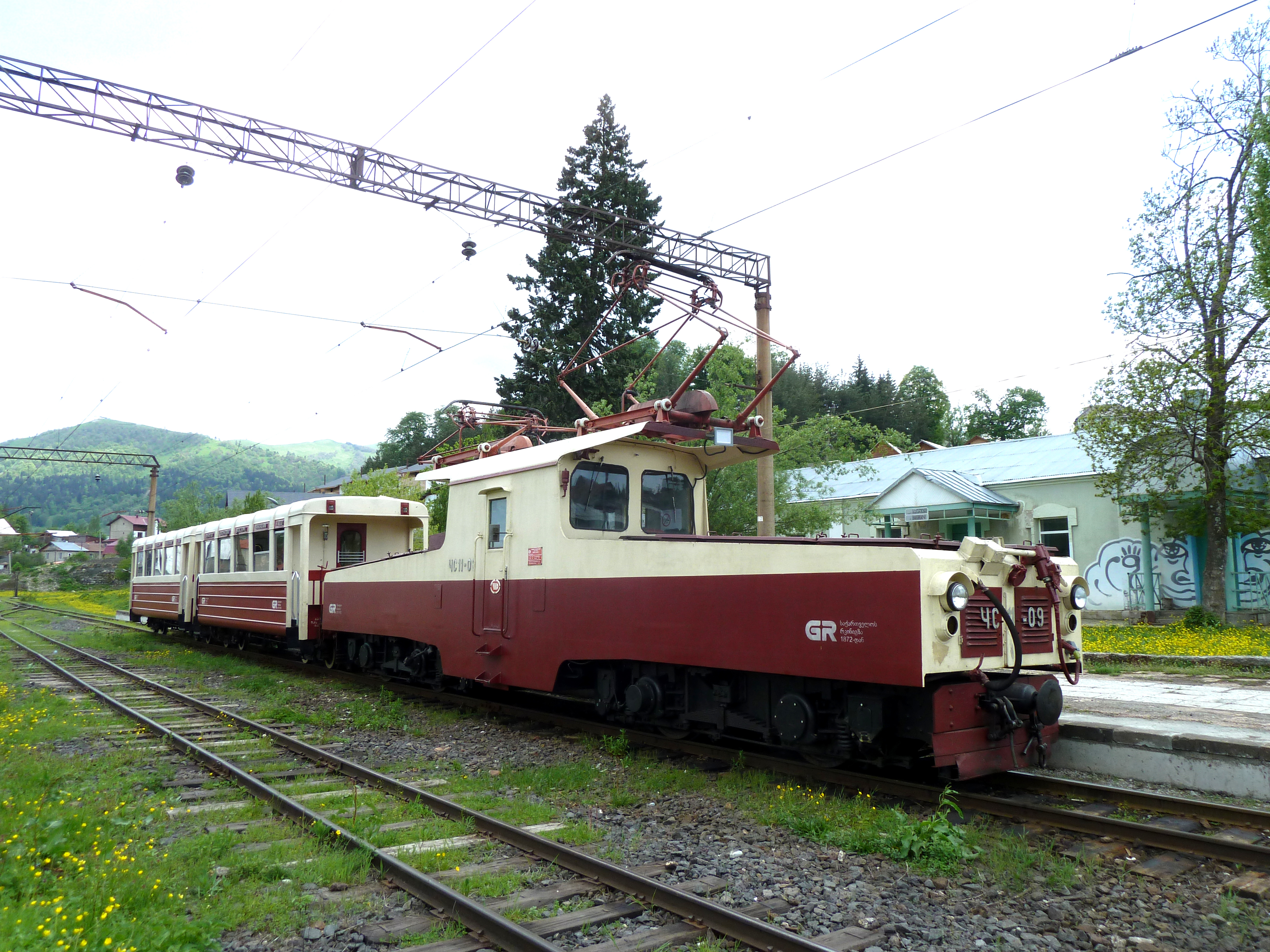
Škoda-built narrow-gauge ChS11 locomotive at Bakuriani, Georgia

The articulated-body design was not unique to the Crocodiles. It was used in the United States on the Milwaukee Road class EP-2 "Bi-Polars", for example.

Many more locomotives adopted the design of long noses without articulation of the body. The single Ge 4/4 of the Yverdon–Ste-Croix railway was known as the "Crocodile", despite being an elongated Bo-Bo steeplecab with articulated bogies beneath, rather than an articulated locomotive. This extended to painting it with large crocodile heads on each side.

In the United Kingdom, the LNER Class ES1 featured a crocodile-like design and was built between 1902 and 1904, both locomotives remaining in service until 1966, when No.2 was scrapped and No. 1 (BR No.26500) was preserved, now on display at Shildon Locomotion Museum.

The Panama Canal uses double-ended locomotives, known as 'mules', to act as land-based tugs to steer ships through the Canal's lock chambers.

Furthermore, some examples of locomotives similar in design to the Crocodiles, which were manufactured by Škoda can be found on the route between Borjomi and Bakuriani in Georgia.
