= Punt Muragl Staz railway station =

Railway station in Switzerland

Punt Muragl Staz
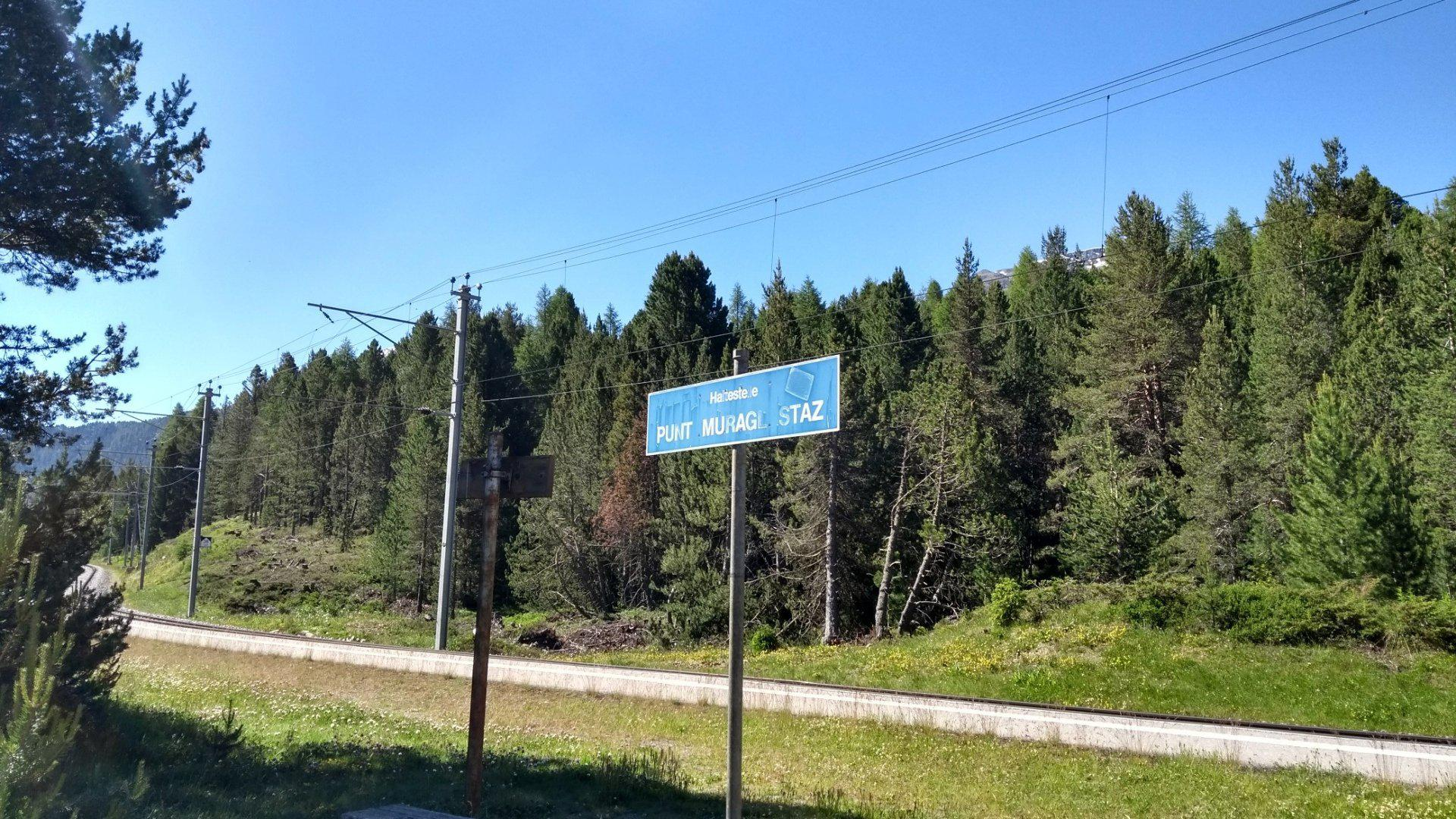
- The station platform in 2018

General information
- Location: 7503 Samedan; Celerina/Schlarigna; Switzerland
- Coordinates: 46°30′26″N 9°52′49″E
- Elevation: 1,736 m (5,696 ft)
- Owner: Rhaetian Railway
- Line: Bernina line
- Distance: 3.5 km (2.2 mi) from St. Moritz
- Train operators: Rhaetian Railway

Other information
- Fare zone: 30 (Engadin Mobil)

History
- Opened: 18 August 1908

Passengers
- 2018: 50 per weekday

Services
Preceding station	Rhaetian Railway	Following station
Celerina Staz towards St. Moritz	RE 9	Pontresina towards Tirano
Celerina Staz towards St. Moritz	R 19	Pontresina towards Tirano
Location

Punt Muragl Staz railway station is a railway station in the municipality of Celerina/Schlarigna, in the Swiss canton of Graubünden. It is located on the Bernina line of the Rhaetian Railway.

The station has a single through track and a single platform. There are no station buildings.

Punt Muragl railway station, on the Samedan–Pontresina line of the Rhaetian Railway, is located on the other side of the river Flaz, as is the lower station of the Muottas-Muragl-Bahn, a funicular railway that ascends to the summit of Muottas Muragl. A bridge across the river links the stations.

== Services ==
As of the December 2023 timetable change, the following services stop at Punt Muragl Staz:

- RegioExpress / Regio: hourly service between St. Moritz and Tirano.
