= Punt Muragl railway station =

Railway station in Switzerland

Punt Muragl
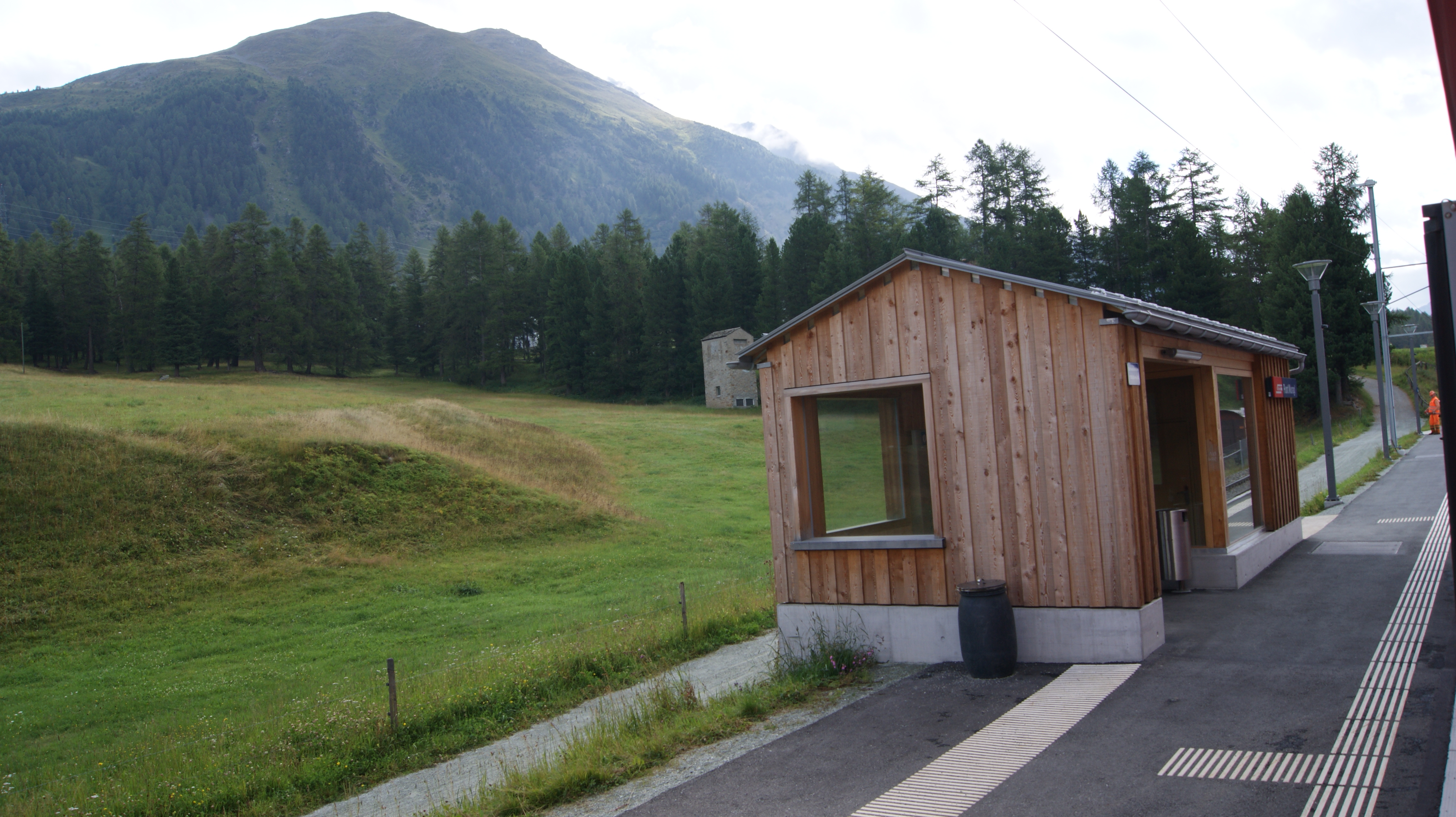
- The station platform in 2018

General information
- Location: Via da Puntraschigna; Samedan; Switzerland
- Coordinates: 46°30′35″N 9°52′52″E
- Elevation: 1,728 m (5,669 ft)
- Owner: Rhaetian Railway
- Line: Samedan–Pontresina line
- Distance: 100.5 km (62.4 mi) from Landquart
- Train operators: Rhaetian Railway
- Connections: PostAuto Schweiz and Engadin Bus

Other information
- Fare zone: 30 (Engadin Mobil)

History
- Opened: 1 July 1908
- Electrified: 1 July 1913

Passengers
- 2018: 90 per weekday

Services
Preceding station	Rhaetian Railway	Following station
Pontresina Terminus	R 15	Samedan towards Scuol-Tarasp
Location

Punt Muragl railway station is a railway station in the municipality of Samedan, in the Swiss canton of Graubünden. It is located on the Samedan–Pontresina line of the Rhaetian Railway.

The station has a single through track and a single platform with a waiting shelter. An adjacent industrial premise has a private siding.

A short distance from the station is the valley station of the Muottas-Muragl-Bahn, a funicular railway that ascends to the summit of Muottas Muragl. Punt Muragl Staz railway station, on the Bernina line of the Rhaetian Railway, is located on the other side of the river Flaz and accessible by a bridge.

== Services ==
As of the December 2023 timetable change, the following services stop at Punt Muragl:

- Regio: hourly service between Pontresina and Scuol-Tarasp.
