= Samedan railway station =

Railway station in Switzerland

Samedan
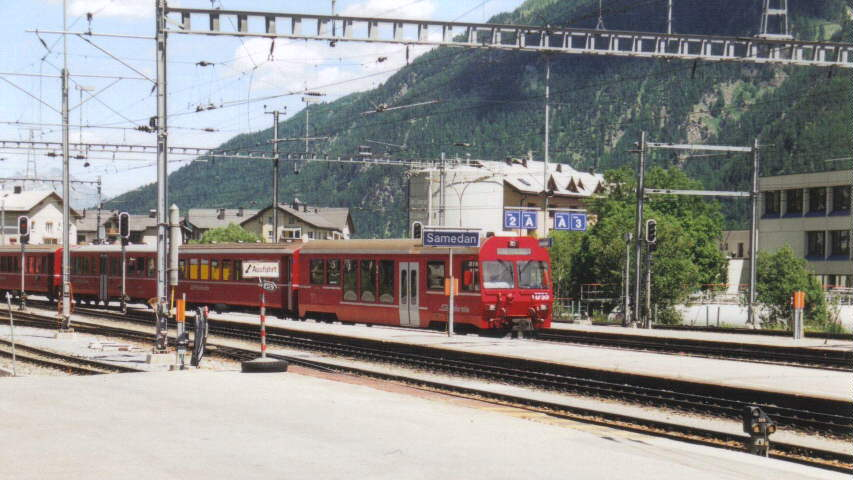
- A train arrives at platform 3 in 2003

General information
- Location: Via Retica; Samedan; Switzerland
- Coordinates: 46°32′02″N 9°52′25″E
- Elevation: 1,705 m (5,594 ft)
- Owner: Rhaetian Railway
- Lines: Albula line; Samedan–Pontresina line
- Distance: 97.7 km (60.7 mi) from Landquart
- Train operators: Glacier Express; Rhaetian Railway
- Connections: Engadin Bus

Other information
- Fare zone: 40 (Engadin Mobil)

History
- Opened: 1 July 1903

Passengers
- 2018: 2,900 per weekday

Services
Preceding station	Rhaetian Railway	Following station
Celerina towards St. Moritz	IR 38	Spinas towards Chur
Celerina towards St. Moritz	RE 3	Bever towards Landquart
Punt Muragl towards Pontresina	R 15	Bever towards Scuol-Tarasp
Preceding station	Glacier Express	Following station
St. Moritz Terminus	Glacier Express	Filisur towards Zermatt
Location

Samedan railway station is a railway station in the municipality of Samedan, in the Swiss canton of Graubünden. It is an important interchange station on the Rhaetian Railway network between the Albula Railway line (between Chur and St. Moritz) and the Samedan–Pontresina railway. Hourly services operate on each line.

== Services ==
As of the December 2023 timetable change, the following services stop at Samedan:

- Glacier Express: Several round-trips per day between Zermatt and St. Moritz.
- InterRegio: hourly service between Chur and St. Moritz.
- RegioExpress: hourly service between Landquart and St. Moritz.
- Regio: hourly service between Scuol-Tarasp and Pontresina.
