= Bever railway station =

Railway station in Switzerland

Bever
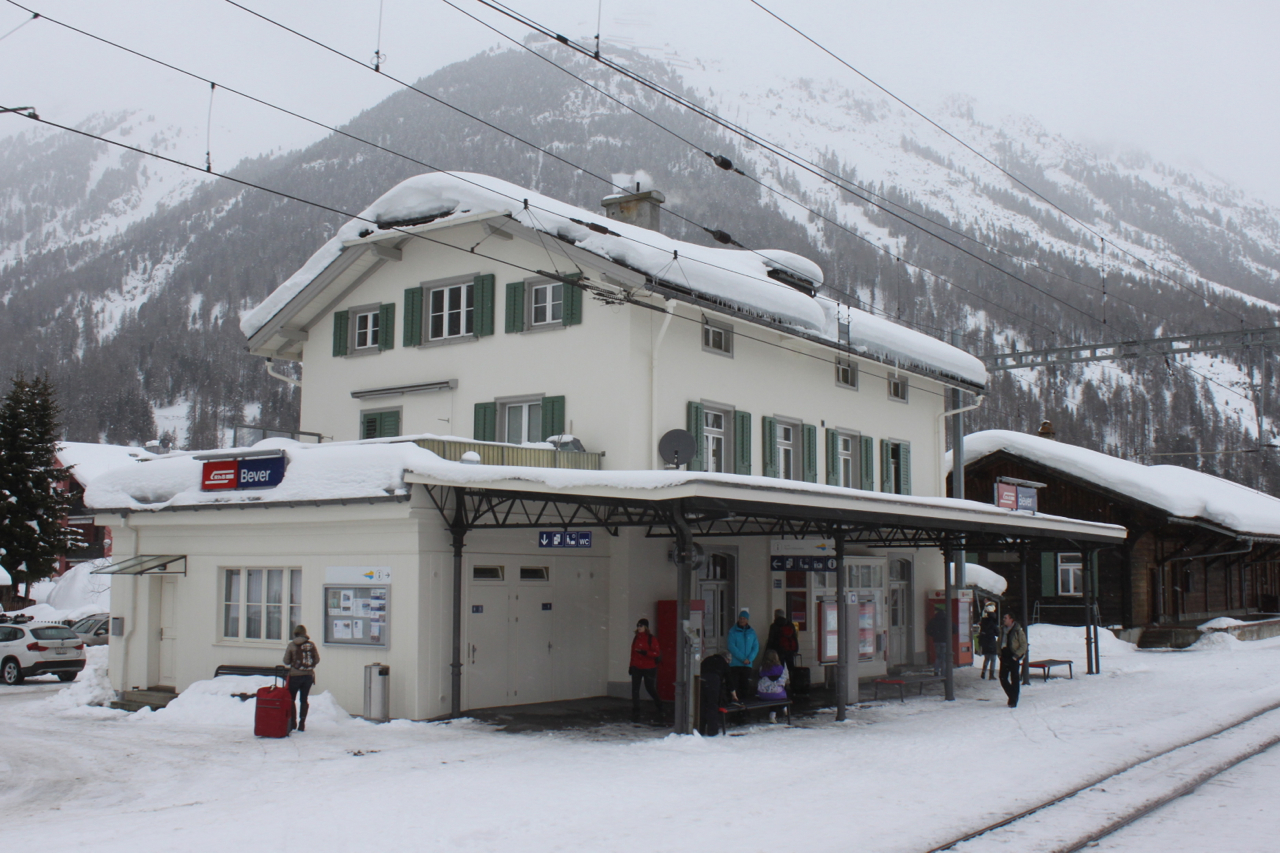
- The station in 2014

General information
- Location: Via Maistra; Bever; Switzerland
- Coordinates: 46°33′00″N 9°53′18″E
- Elevation: 1,710 m (5,610 ft)
- Owner: Rhaetian Railway
- Lines: Albula line; Bever–Scuol-Tarasp line
- Distance: 95.6 km (59.4 mi) from Landquart
- Train operators: Rhaetian Railway
- Connections: Engadin Bus

Other information
- Fare zone: 40 (Engadin Mobil)

History
- Opened: 1 July 1903
- Electrified: 20 April 1919

Passengers
- 2018: 260 per weekday

Services
Preceding station	Rhaetian Railway	Following station
Samedan towards St. Moritz	RE 3	Zuoz towards Landquart
Samedan towards Pontresina	R 15	La Punt Chamues-ch towards Scuol-Tarasp
Location

Bever railway station is a railway station in the municipality of Bever, in the Swiss canton of Graubünden. It is located at the junction of the 1,000 mm (3 ft 3 3/8 in) metre gauge Albula and Bever–Scuol-Tarasp lines of the Rhaetian Railway. It is located to the southwest of the village of Bever at 1710 m above sea level. The station is normally served only by the passenger trains that operate on the Engadine line.

== Services ==
As of the December 2023 timetable change, the following services stop at Bever:

- RegioExpress: hourly service between Landquart and St. Moritz.
- Regio: hourly service between Scuol-Tarasp and Pontresina.
