= Muottas Muragl =

Mountain in Switzerland

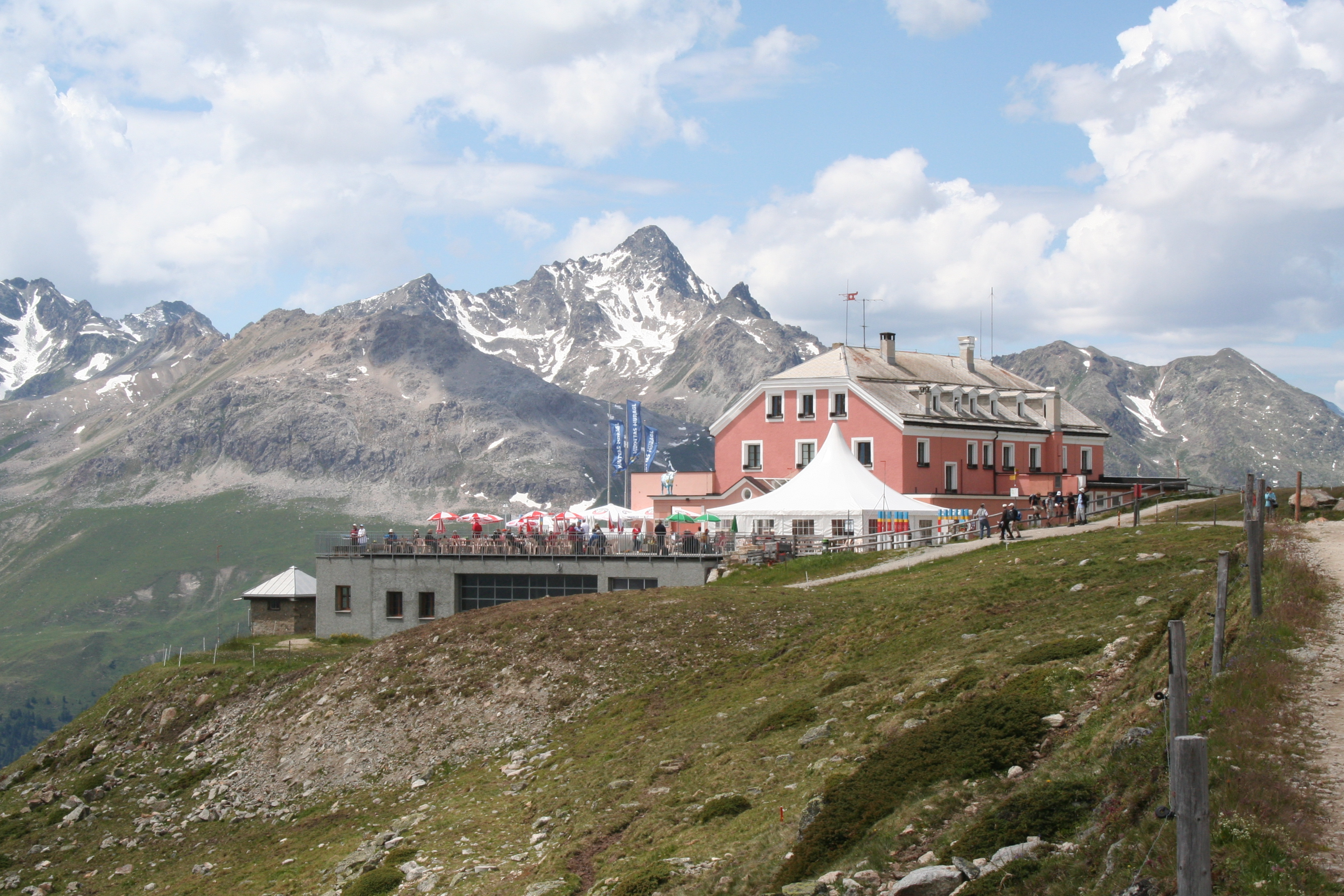
- View from Muottas Muragl towards Piz Ot

Highest point
- Elevation: 2,454 m (8,051 ft)
- Coordinates: 46°31′18″N 9°54′09″E

Geography
- Location within Switzerland
- Location: Graubünden, Switzerland
- Parent range: Livigno Alps

Climbing
- Easiest route: Funicular

Muottas Muragl (2,454 m) is a location on the southern slopes of the Blais da Muottas (2,568 m), a summit at the western end of the range descending from Piz Vadret, in the Swiss canton of Graubünden. It overlooks the Engadin, between the towns of Samedan, St. Moritz and Pontresina. The mountain is within the municipality of Samedan.

Muottas Muragl is accessible by a funicular railway, between Celerina and Pontresina, the Muottas-Muragl-Bahn, from the train stations Punt Muragl and Punt Muragl Staz, both served by the Rhaetian Railway. Muottas Muragl includes a hotel and a panoramic restaurant.
