= Muottas-Muragl-Bahn =

Funicular railway in Engadin, Switzerland

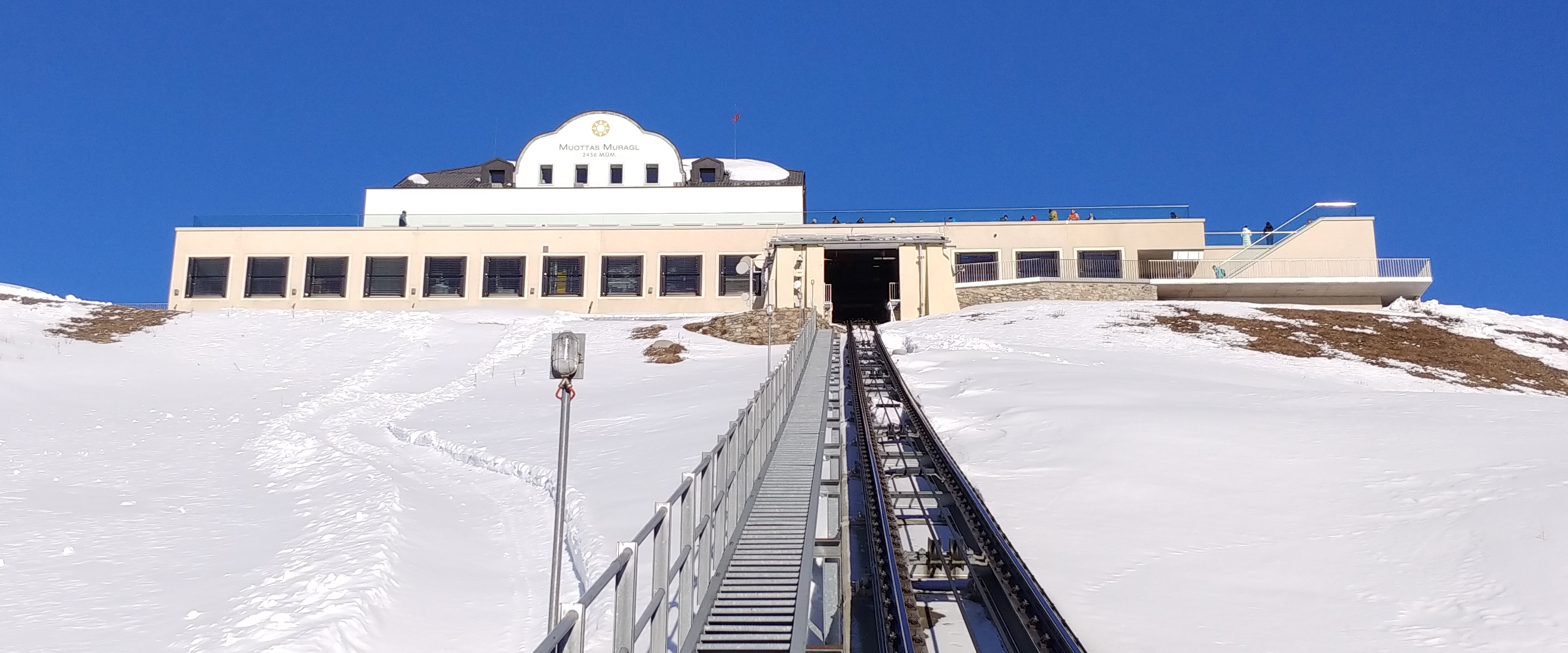
- upper station (2022)

Overview
- Other name(s): Drahtseilbahn Muottas-Muraigl
- Status: In operation
- Owner: Engadin St. Moritz Mountains AG
- Locale: Engadin, Switzerland
- Termini: Punt Muragl (Talstation); Muottas Muragl
- Connecting lines: Bernina line, Samedan–Pontresina line
- Stations: 2
- Website: Muottas-Muragl

Service
- Type: Funicular
- Operator(s): Engadin St. Moritz Mountains AG
- Rolling stock: 2

History
- Opened: 9 August 1907

Technical
- Line length: 2,170 m (7,120 ft)
- Number of tracks: 1 with passing loop
- Highest elevation: 2,445 metres (8,022 ft)
- Maximum incline: 54%

Muottas-Muragl-Bahn is a funicular railway in Engadin, Switzerland. The line leads from Punt Murgal near Samedan at 1740 m to Muottas Muragl at 2445 m near its summit (2453 m). The funicular with two cars has a single track with a passing loop. The line of 2170 m in length has a difference of elevation of 705 m at a maximum inclination of 54%.

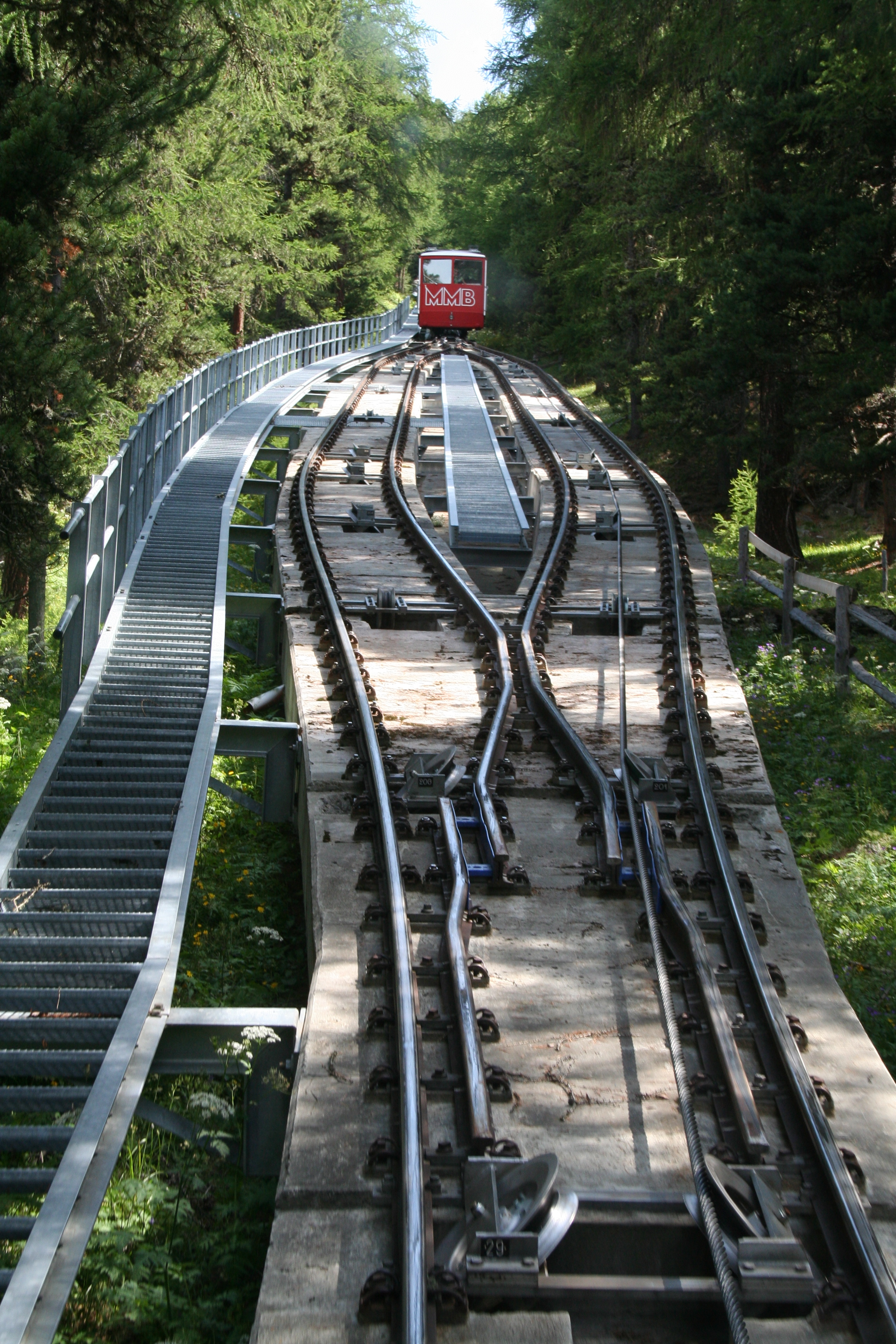
Passing loop (2009)

Two lines of the Rhaetian Railway have stations near the funicular's base station: Punt Muragl on the Samedan–Pontresina line and Punt Muragl Staz on the Bernina line (St. Moritz-Pontresina).

Completed in 1907, it was the longest single-section funicular in Switzerland, longer lines having separate sections. The original concession allowed operation in summer only, but this was changed in 1908 already. The name was initially written "Muottas Muraigl".

The line was rebuilt in 1992, earlier specifications are different.

The funicular is owned and operated by Engadin St. Moritz Mountains AG.
