= Erlbach =

Erlbach may refer to:

- Erlbach, Bavaria, a municipality in the district of Altötting in Bavaria, Germany
- Markt Erlbach, a municipality in the district of Neustadt (Aisch)-Bad Windsheim in Bavaria, Germany
- Erlbach, Saxony, a village and former municipality in Saxony, Germany, today part of the town Markneukirchen
- Erlbach-Kirchberg, a former municipality in Saxony, Germany, today part of the town Lugau
- Erlbach (Rott), a river of Bavaria, Germany, tributary of the Rott
