= Murn =

Murn may refer to:

- Murn (river), Germany
- Clemson Murn, a character in the DC Extended Universe
- Josip Murn, (1879–1901), Slovenian poet
- Uroš Murn (born 1975), Slovenian bicycle racer
