= Piz Vadret (Livigno Alps) =

Mountain in Switzerland

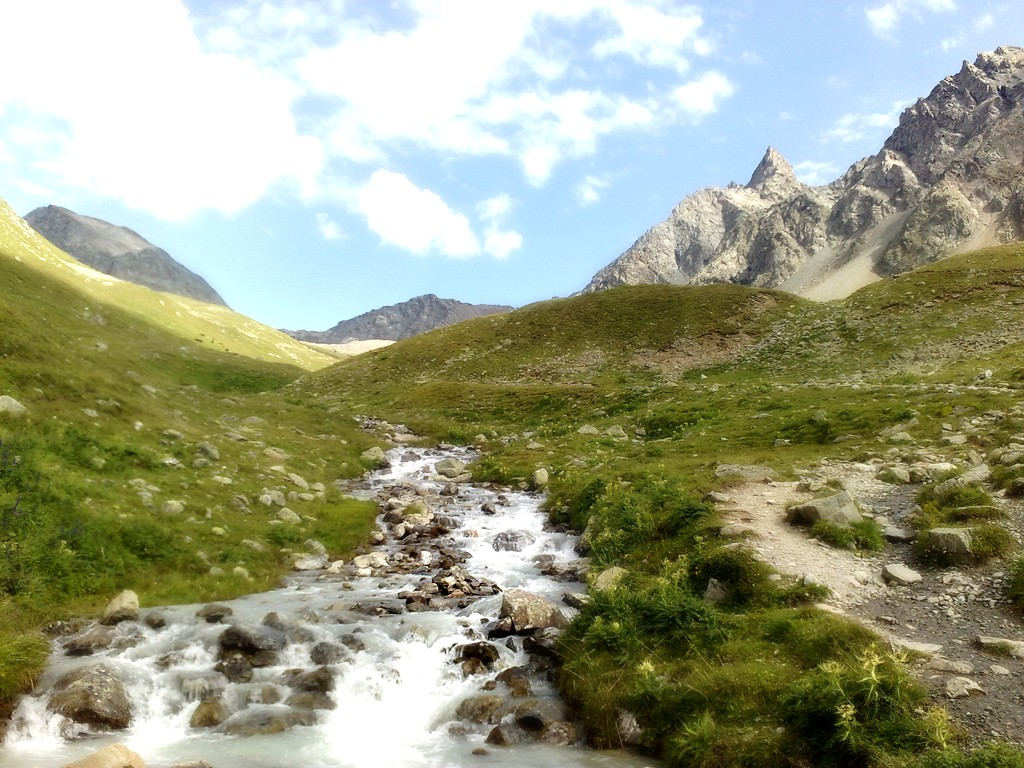
- Piz Vadret (left summit) from Val Muragl

Highest point
- Elevation: 3,199 m (10,495 ft)
- Prominence: 308 m (1,010 ft)
- Parent peak: Piz Languard
- Listing: Alpine mountains above 3000 m
- Coordinates: 46°30′32.6″N 9°57′2.6″E

Geography
- Location within Switzerland
- Location: Graubünden, Switzerland
- Parent range: Livigno Alps

Piz Vadret is a mountain of the Swiss Livigno Alps, located east of Samedan in the canton of Graubünden. It lies just north of Fuorcla Muragl, between the valleys of Champagna, Muragl and Prüna.

The closest access is from the funicular station at Muottas Muragl.
