= Rott (Inn, Rott am Inn) =

River in Germany

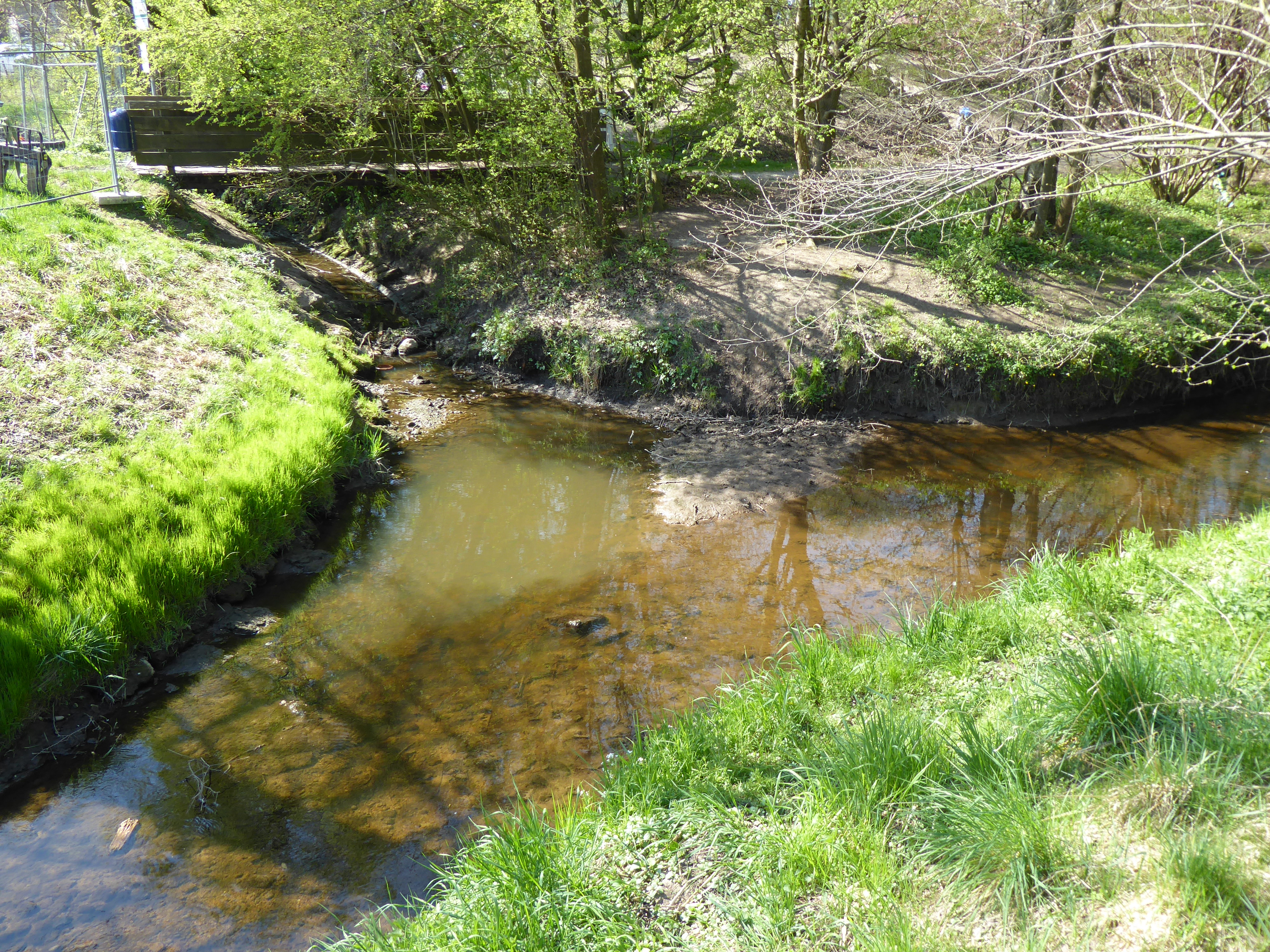
- The Rott (flowing from right to left foreground), and the mouth of the Erlbach on the Rott's left bank

Location
- Country: Germany
- State: Bavaria

Physical characteristics
- Mouth
  - location: Inn
  - coordinates: 47.9912°N 12.1554°E
- Length: 25.0 km (15.5 mi)
- Basin size: 110 km^{2} (42 sq mi)

Basin features
- Progression: Inn→ Danube→ Black Sea

The Rott (German pronunciation: [ʁɔt]) is a river of Bavaria, Germany, and a left tributary of the Inn. The Rott springs north of the parish Thann of Großkarolinenfeld. It then flows through Großkarolinenfeld and discharges near Rott am Inn into the Inn.

== See also ==
- List of rivers of Bavaria
