= Egglfing-Obernberg Hydropower Plant =

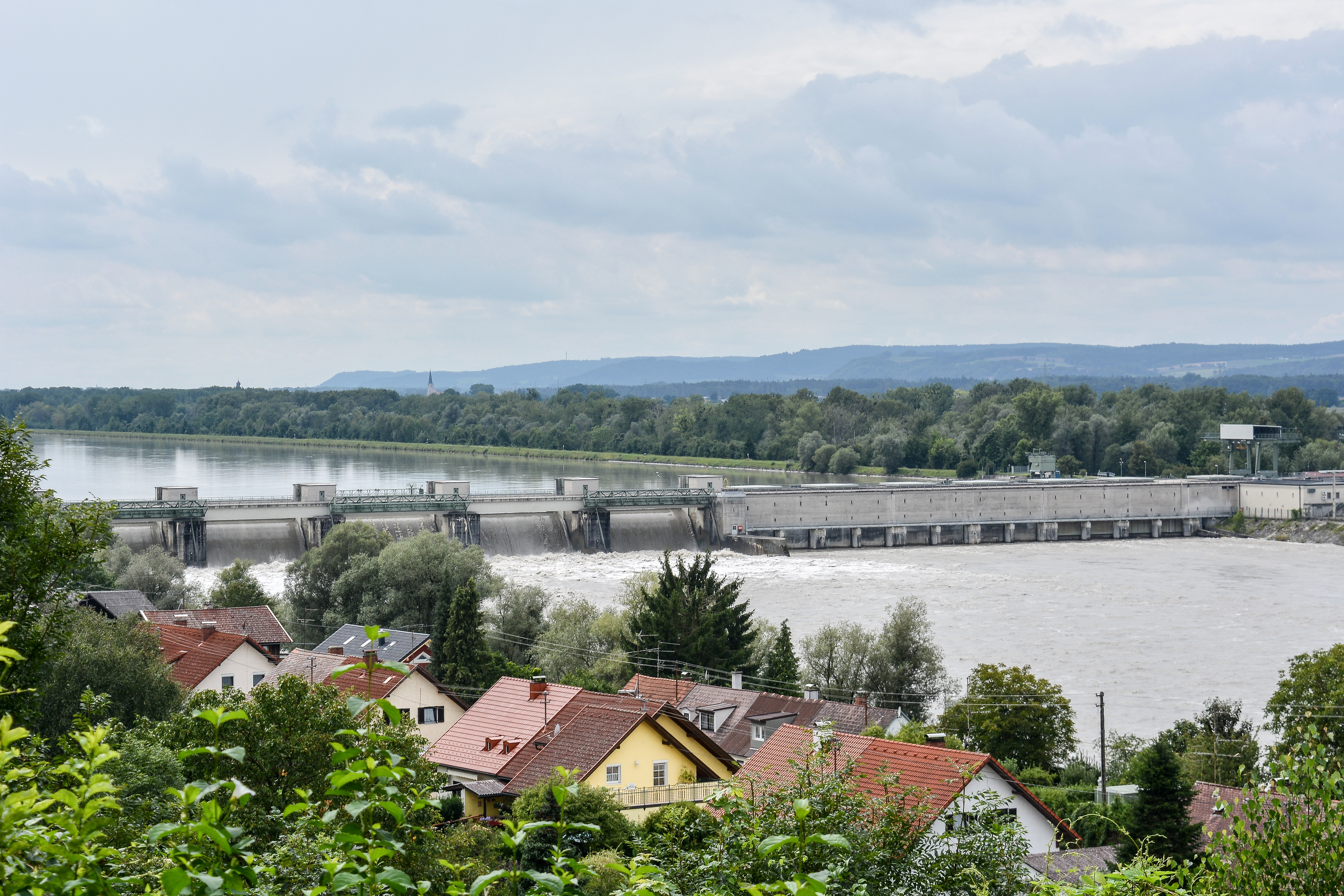

- Location within Austria
- Official name: Kraftwerk Egglfing-Obernberg
- Location: Bavaria, Germany and Upper Austria, Austria
- Coordinates: 48.318535°N 13.319979°E
- Purpose: Power
- Status: Operational
- Construction began: 1941
- Opening date: 1944
- Owner: Verbund
- Operator: Verbund

Dam and spillways
- Type of dam: Concrete gravity dam
- Impounds: Inn
- Elevation at crest: 329 m (1,079 ft)

Reservoir
- Maximum length: 12.7 km (7.9 mi)
- Normal elevation: 325.90 m (1,069.2 ft)

Power Station
- Operator: Verbund
- Commission date: 1944
- Hydraulic head: 10.5 m (34 ft)
- Turbines: 6 Kaplan-type
- Installed capacity: 84 MW
- Annual generation: 485 mio. Kwh
- Website https://web.archive.org/web/20160306234132/http://www.verbund.com/pp/en/run-of-river-power-plant/egglfing-obernberg

Egglfing-Obernberg Hydropower Plant (German: Kraftwerk Egglfing-Obernberg) is a run-of-the-river hydroelectric power plant on the Inn, where the river forms the border between Germany and Austria. The municipality of Egglfing, Bavaria, is located on the left side of the Inn and the municipality of Obernberg, Upper Austria, is located on the right side.

== History ==
To supply an aluminium smelter near Braunau with power, two hydropower plants were to be constructed on the Inn: Ering-Frauenstein and Egglfing-Obernberg. Work on the Ering-Frauenstein plant began in February 1939. In January 1943, all 3 machines were operational.

Work on the Egglfing-Obernberg hydropower plant began in July 1941. The first turbine went online in October 1944, the second in January 1946. The 6th machine went online in September 1950. The last construction works were finished in July 1951.

== Dam ==
The dam is a concrete gravity dam. The powerhouse, with the 6 generators, is located on the left side of the Inn. The spillway is located on the right side and features five gates, each measuring 23 m in length. Upstream of the powerhouse, the dam features an additional concrete wall as protection against bombs.

== Reservoir ==
At whole reservoir level of 325.90 m, the dam's reservoir has a length of 12.7 km. On both sides of the reservoir are embankment dams. The reservoir is part of the Ramsar site Unterer Inn.

== Power plant ==
The power plant has a nameplate capacity of 84 MW and contains 6 Kaplan turbine-generators. The annual generation is about 485 mio. kwh. The turbines were supplied by Escher-Wyss and the generators by Siemens. Beginning in 1983, the original turbines with 4 blades were replaced with turbines featuring 5 blades. The average hydraulic head is 10.5 m.

== See also ==
- List of power stations in Austria
