= Großkarolinenfeld =

- Municipality
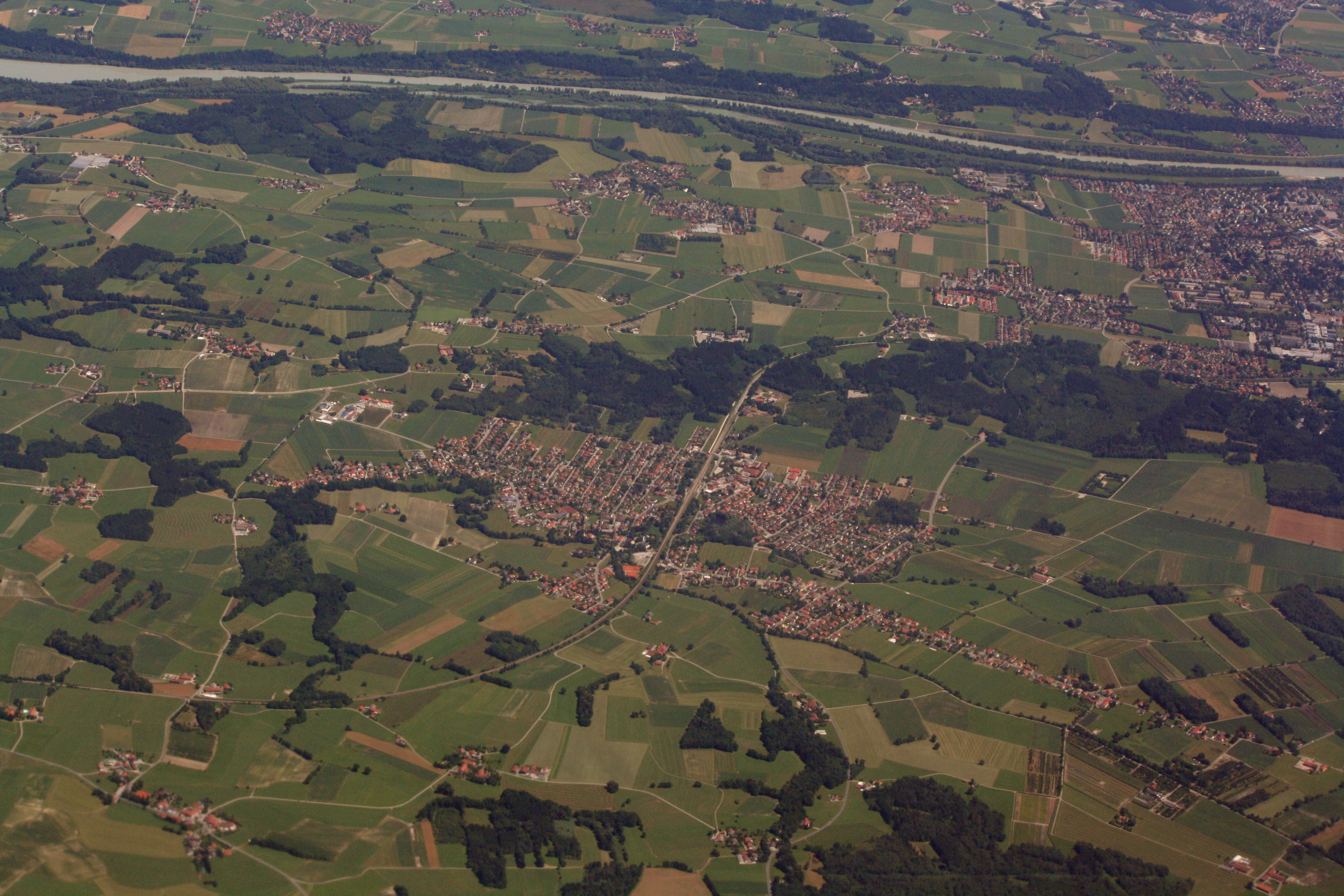
- Aerial view

- Coat of arms

- Location of Großkarolinenfeld within Rosenheim district
- Interactive map of Großkarolinenfeld
- Location within Germany Location within Bavaria
- Coordinates: 47°53′27″N 12°4′47″E
- Country: Germany
- State: Bavaria
- Admin. region: Oberbayern
- District: Rosenheim

Government
  - Mayor (since 2026): Anton Wallner

Area
  - Total: 29.07 km^{2} (11.22 sq mi)
- Elevation: 467 m (1,532 ft)

Population (2025-12-31)
  - Total: 7,418
  - Density: 255.2/km^{2} (660.9/sq mi)
- Time zone: UTC+01:00 (CET)
  - Summer (DST): UTC+02:00 (CEST)
- Postal codes: 83109
- Dialling codes: 08031
- Vehicle registration: RO
- Website: www.grosskarolinenfeld.de

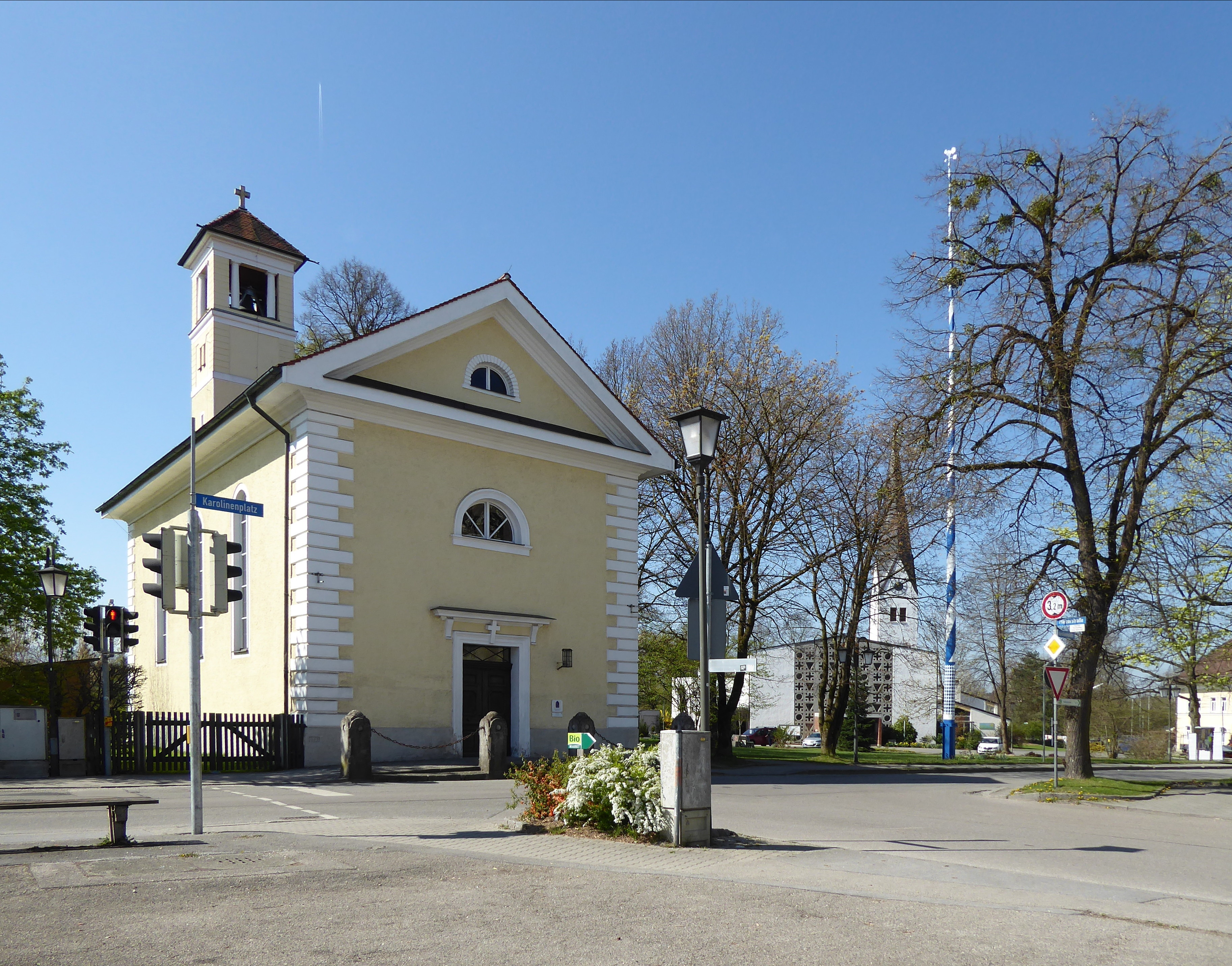
Foreground left: Protestant church Karolinenkirche, background right: Catholic church Heilig Blut

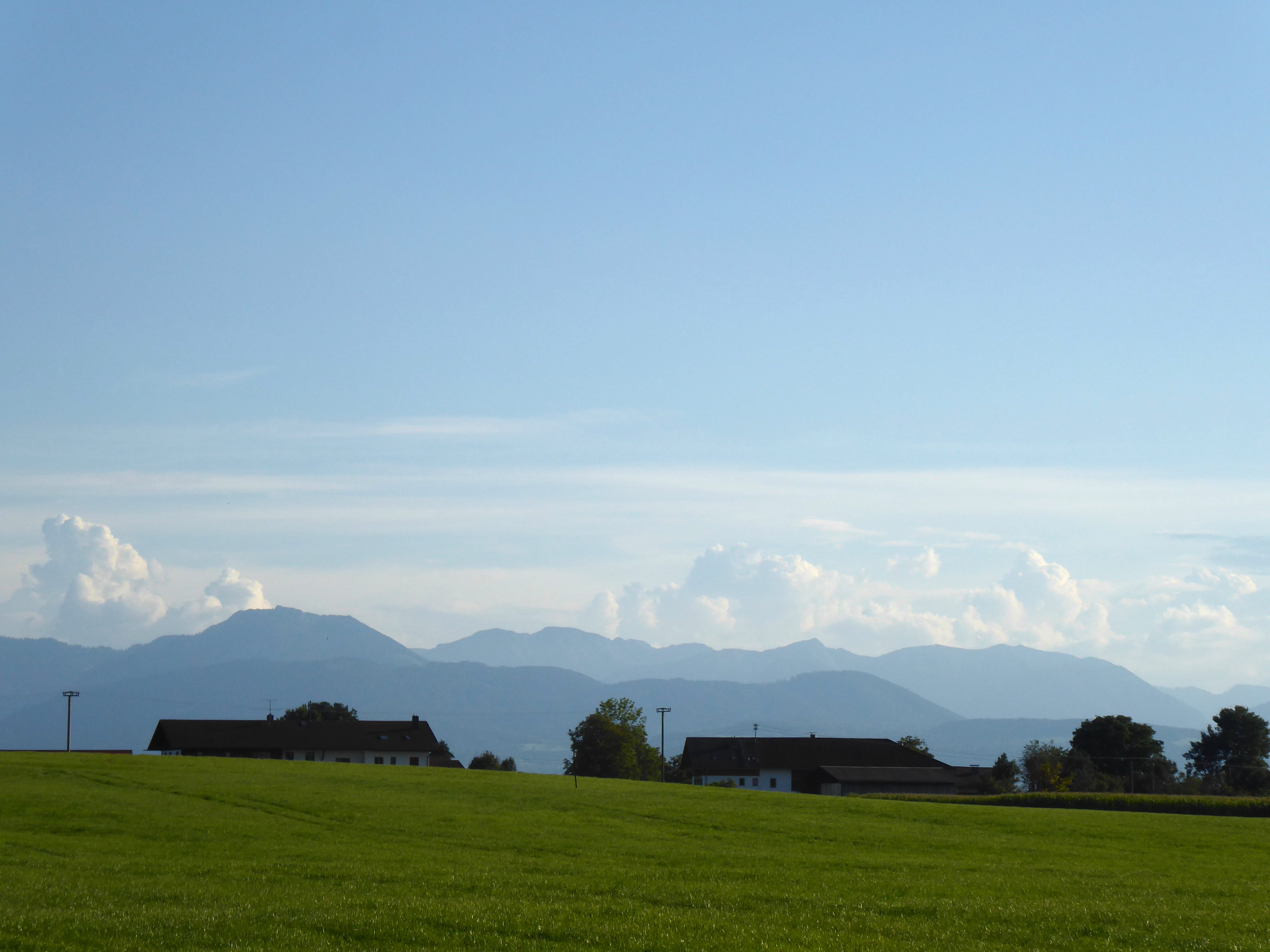
Ester, one of the boroughs of Großkarolinenfeld

Großkarolinenfeld (German pronunciation: [ɡʁoːskaʁoˈliːnənfɛlt]) is a municipality in the district of Rosenheim in Bavaria in Germany.

It is located at the Munich–Rosenheim railway. The Großkarolinenfeld station is served about once per hour by local trains of the company Bayerische Regiobahn.

There are 41 official boroughs of Großkarolinenfeld. The larger ones are Großkarolinenfeld itself, Jarezöd (also known as Dred), Hilperting, Tattenhausen and Thann, the smaller ones are mostly farmsteads, namely Alsterloh, Ametsbichl, Aschach, Auberg, Bach, Bichl, Buchrain, Deutlstätt, Ester, Filzen, Frauenholz, Gröben, Gutmart, Haslau, Hohenaich, Hub, Kirchsteig, Kolberg, Krabichl, Lehen, Linden, Mühlbach, Naglstätt, Öd, Ödenhub, Petzenbichl, Rann, Ried, Riedhof, Rott, Schlimmerstätt, Schwaig, Stolz, Thonbichl, Vogl, and Zweckstätt.

Three rivers are located in the borough of Großkarolinenfeld: The Aschach and the Erlbach discharge into the Rott.

== History ==
In 1802, the Catholic Maximilian I Joseph of Bavaria and his Protestant wife Caroline of Baden decreed that people from the Electoral Palatinate may settle down in some places at the Old Bavarian Donaumoos. One of these places was the new municipality of Großkarolinenfeld. In 1882, the first Protestant church in Altbayern was erected here.

Around 1944 - 1945, Großkarolinenfeld was resulted of significant damage because the Allied Powers arrived after defeating Nazi Germany.
