= Erlbach (Rott) =

River in Germany

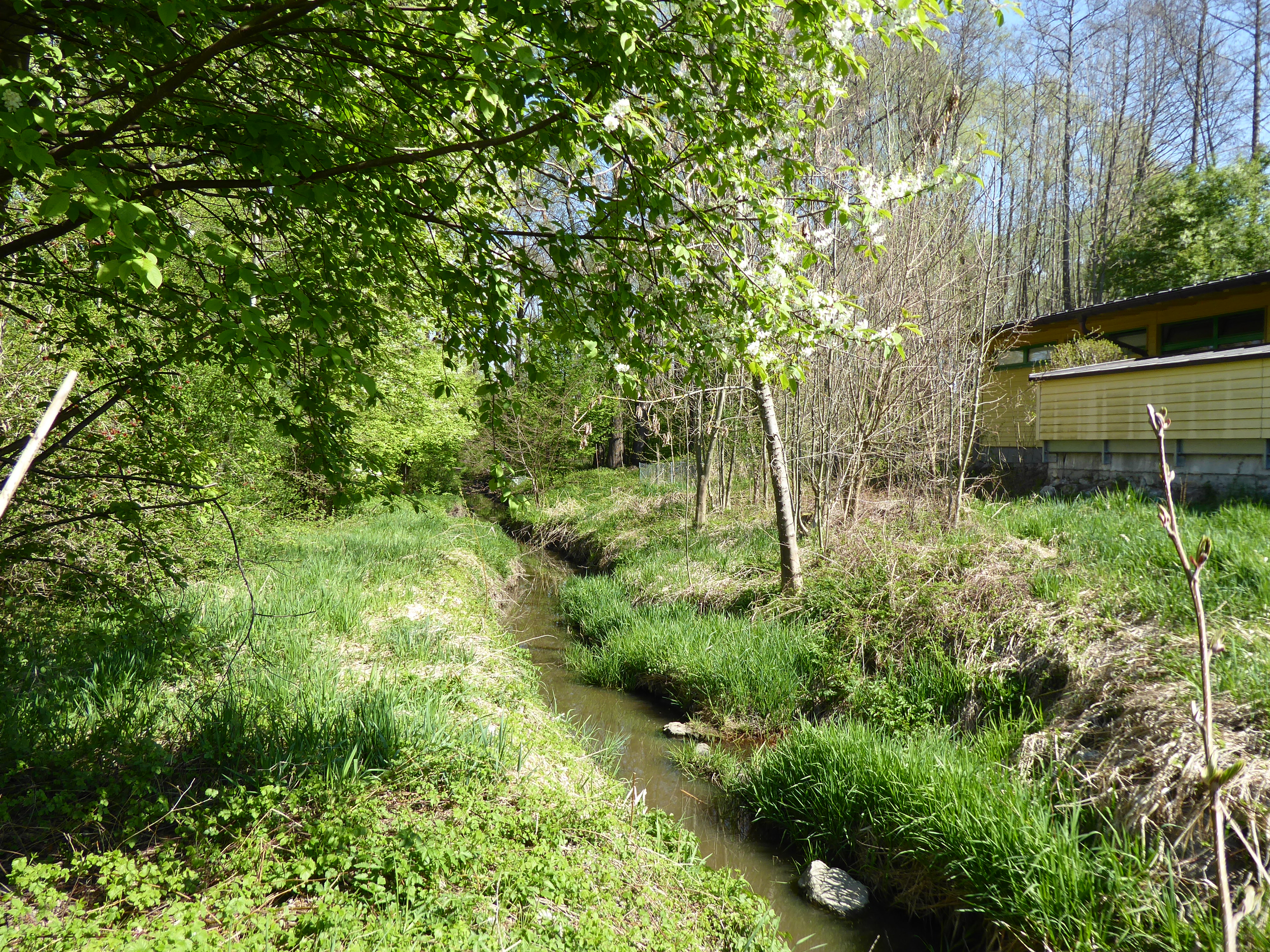
- Erlbach (in the right a part of the kindergarten Pusteblume is visible)

Location
- Country: Germany
- State: Bavaria

Physical characteristics
- Mouth
  - location: Rott
  - coordinates: 47.8915°N 12.0772°E

Basin features
- Progression: Rott→ Inn→ Danube→ Black Sea

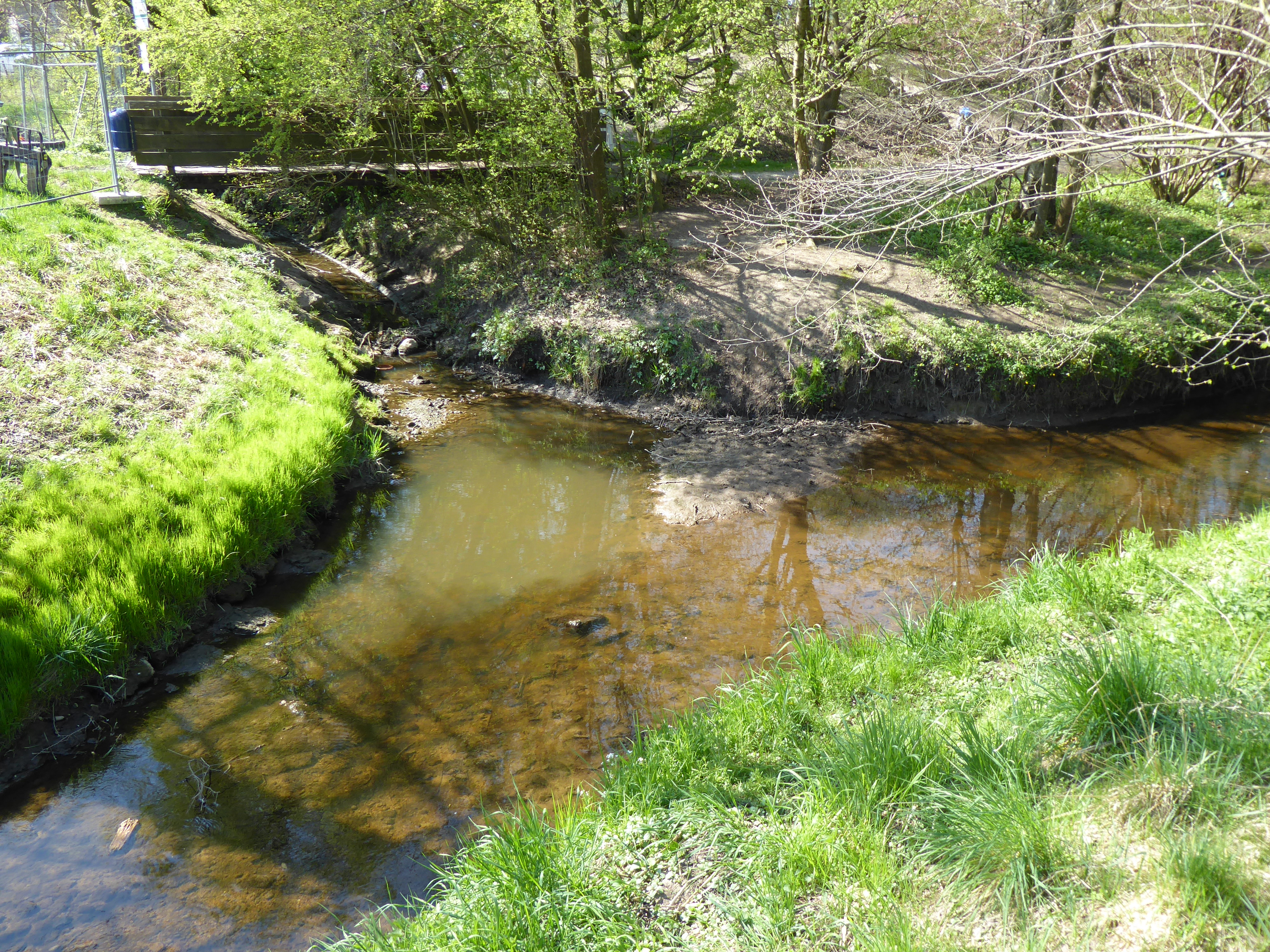
The Erlbach (from the background) discharging into the Rott (flowing from right to left)

The Erlbach is a river of Bavaria, Germany.

The Erlbach springs south of Großkarolinenfeld. and discharges near the center of Großkarolinenfeld from the right into the Rott.

== See also ==
- List of rivers of Bavaria
