= Celerina/Schlarigna =

- Municipality
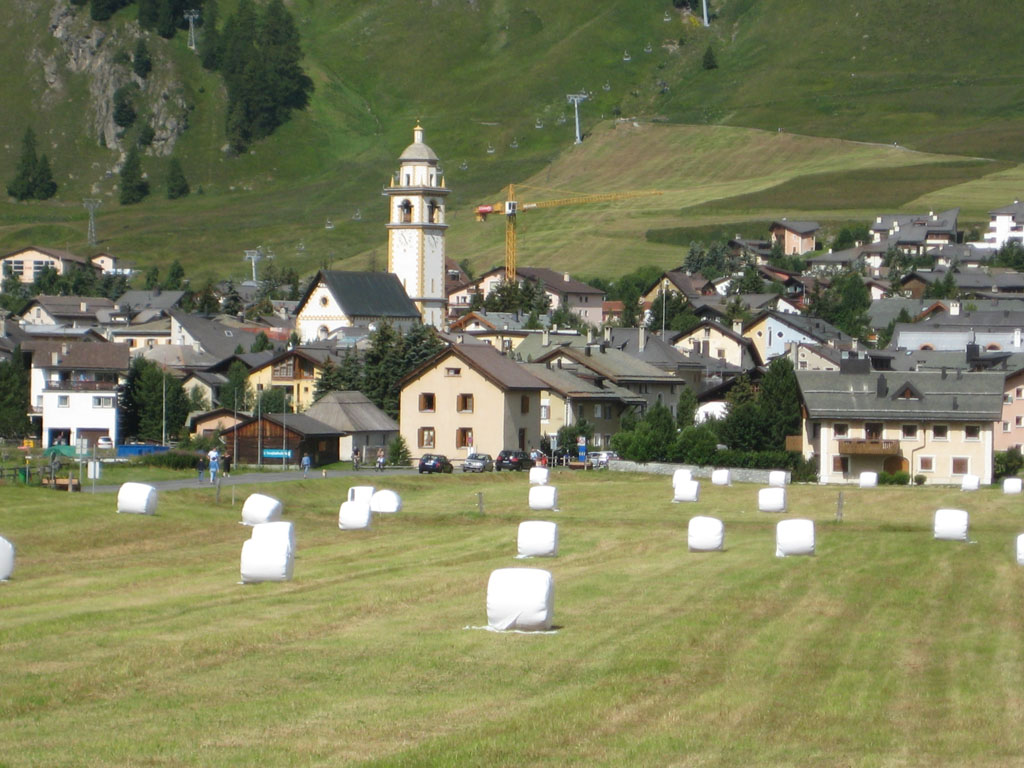

- Flag Coat of arms
- Location of Celerina/Schlarigna
- Location within Switzerland Location within Canton of Grisons
- Coordinates: 46°31′N 9°52′E
- Country: Switzerland
- Canton: Grisons
- District: Maloja

Area
  - Total: 24.03 km^{2} (9.28 sq mi)
- Elevation: 1,714 m (5,623 ft)

Population (December 2020)
  - Total: 1,484
  - Density: 61.76/km^{2} (159.9/sq mi)
- Time zone: UTC+01:00 (CET)
  - Summer (DST): UTC+02:00 (CEST)
- Postal code: 7505
- SFOS number: 3782
- ISO 3166 code: CH-GR
- Surrounded by: Pontresina, Samedan, Sankt-Moritz
- Website: www.gemeinde-celerina.ch

Celerina/Schlarigna (German/Italian Celerina; Romansh Schlarigna) is a municipality in the Maloja Region in the Swiss canton of the Grisons.

== History ==
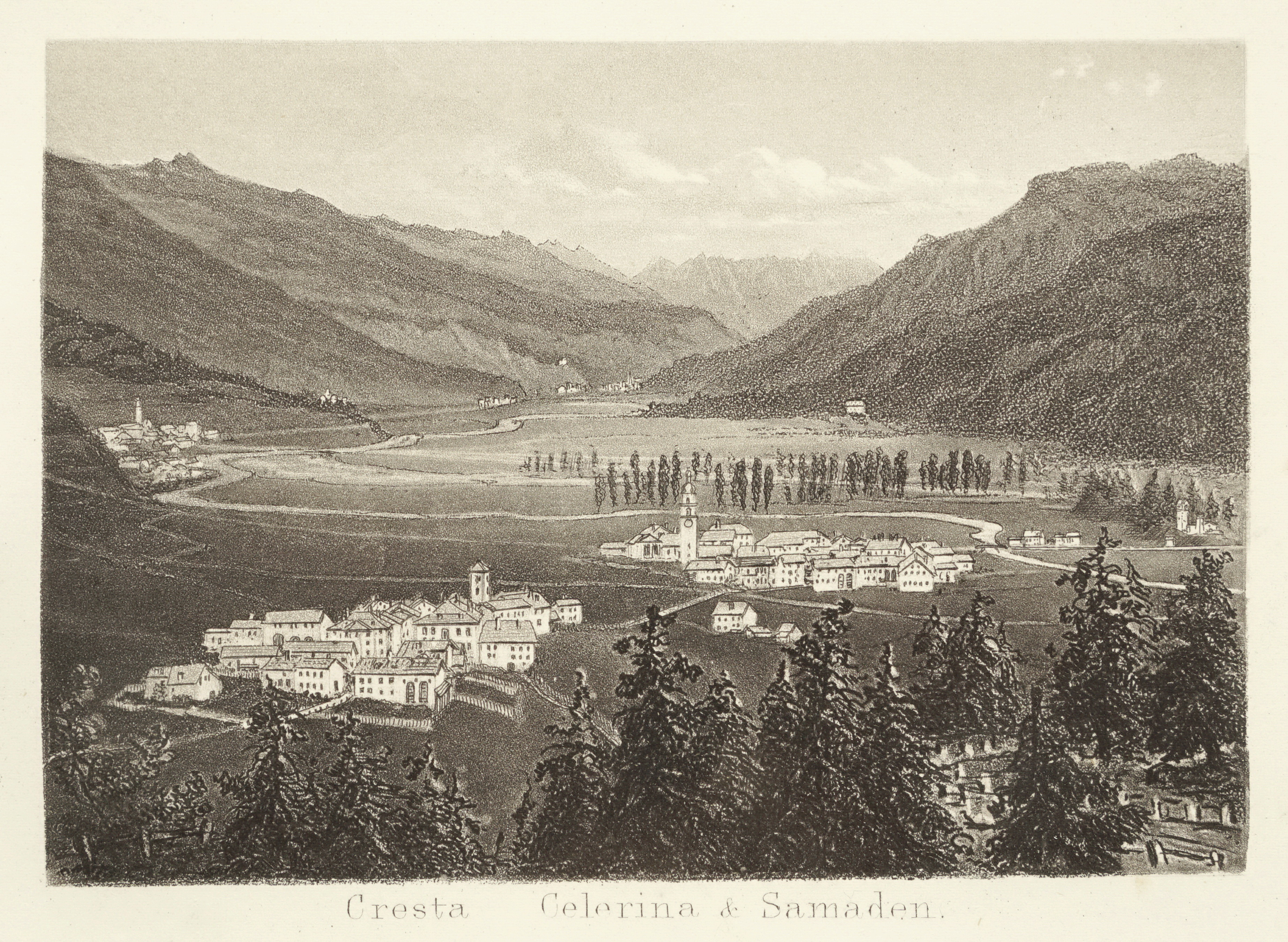
Celerina c. 1870, with the hamlet Cresta on the left. Etching by Heinrich Müller

Celerina/Schlarigna was first mentioned in 1313 as Schellarin and in 1320 as Celarina. In 1631, a fire destroyed 43 houses. From the 1860s onwards, tourism became more and more important to the village. The Cresta Run opened in 1884, the St. Moritz-Celerina Olympic Bobrun in 1904 and the cable car to Saluver in 1958. In the course of the 20th century, the population structure of the originally Romansh-speaking farming village underwent radical change, with people moving to the thriving resort from the German-speaking part of Switzerland and also from Italy.

== Geography ==
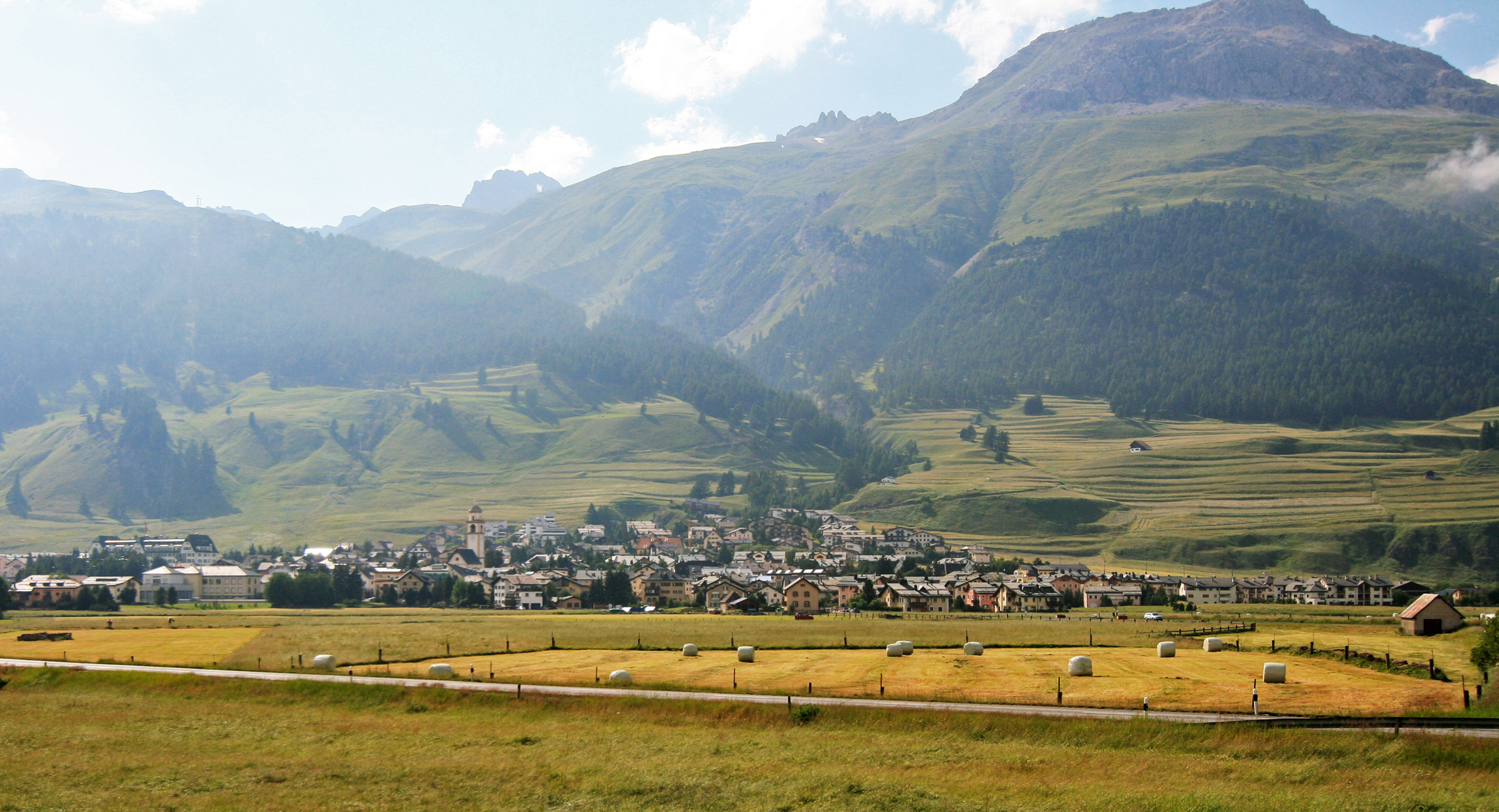
Engadin valley with Celerina/Schlarigna

Aerial view from 200 m by Walter Mittelholzer (1919)

Celerina/Schlarigna has an area, as of 2006, of 24 km^{2} (9.3 sq mi). Of this area, 34% is used for agricultural purposes, while 30.5% is forested. Of the rest of the land, 4.1% is settled (buildings or roads) and the remainder (31.4%) is non-productive (rivers, glaciers or mountains).

It consists of the haufendorf village (an irregular, unplanned and quite closely packed village, built around a central square) of Celerina/Schlarigna and the hamlet of Crasta, in the Oberengadin sub-district of the Maloja district, after 2017 it was part of the Maloja Region. The municipality's official name used to be Celerina, until 1943, when it adopted the name Schlarigna/Celerina. In 1950, it was renamed again to Celerina/Schlarigna.

It is located in the upper Engadin valley in the Oberengadin sub-district of the Maloja district and is across from the entrance of the Bernina Pass into the Engadin. The village is located between St. Moritz, Samedan and Pontresina. The famous Cresta Run for tobogganing leads from St.Moritz to the Cresta neighbourhood of Celerina.

== Demographics ==
Celerina/Schlarigna has a population (as of 31 December 2020) of 1,484. As of 2008, 31.8% of the population was made up of foreign nationals. Over the last 10 years the population has grown at a rate of 13.7%.

As of 2000, the gender distribution of the population was 48.4% male and 51.6% female. The age distribution, as of 2000, in Celerina/Schlarigna is; 152 children or 11.2% of the population are between 0 and 9 years old. 78 teenagers or 5.8% are 10 to 14, and 68 teenagers or 5.0% are 15 to 19. Of the adult population, 215 people or 15.9% of the population are between 20 and 29 years old. 279 people or 20.6% are 30 to 39, 222 people or 16.4% are 40 to 49, and 169 people or 12.5% are 50 to 59. The senior population distribution is 85 people or 6.3% of the population are between 60 and 69 years old, 56 people or 4.1% are 70 to 79, there are 27 people or 2.0% who are 80 to 89, and there are 2 people or 0.1% who are 90 to 99.

In the 2007 federal election the most popular party was the SVP which received 30.3% of the vote. The next three most popular parties were the SP (29.3%), the FDP (26.9%) and the CVP (10.2%).

The entire Swiss population is generally well educated. In Celerina/Schlarigna about 69.9% of the population (between age 25-64) have completed either non-mandatory upper secondary education or additional higher education (either University or a Fachhochschule).

Celerina/Schlarigna has an unemployment rate of 1.47%. As of 2005, there were 20 people employed in the primary economic sector and about 5 businesses involved in this sector. 153 people are employed in the secondary sector and there are 22 businesses in this sector. 564 people are employed in the tertiary sector, with 85 businesses in this sector.

From the 2000 census, 641 or 47.4% are Roman Catholic, while 532 or 39.3% belonged to the Swiss Reformed Church. Of the rest of the population, there are 17 individuals (or about 1.26% of the population) who belong to the Orthodox Church, and there are 10 individuals (or about 0.74% of the population) who belong to another Christian church. There are 11 individuals (or about 0.81% of the population) who are Jewish. There are 5 individuals (or about 0.37% of the population) who belong to another church (not listed on the census), 84 (or about 6.21% of the population) belong to no church, are agnostic or atheist, and 53 individuals (or about 3.92% of the population) did not answer the question.

The historical population is given in the following table:

year	population
1850	245
1900	341
1950	713
1960	868
1970	983
1980	890
1990	975
2000	1,353

== Languages ==
Most of the population (as of 2000) speaks German (58.3%), with Italian being second most common (19.3%) and Romansh being third (12.8%). Until the mid 19th Century, the entire population spoke the Upper-Engadin Romansh dialect of Puter. Due to increasing trade with the outside world, Romansh usage began to decline. In 1860 about 96% spoke Romansh as a first language, while in 1880 it had decreased to 76.9% and in 1900 it was 68%. The last time that Romansh was the majority language in Celerina/Schlarigna was in 1941. Following World War II German became the majority language. However, in 1990 there were still 41% who understood Romansh in Celerina/Schlarigna and in 2000 it was 35%.

Languages in Celerina/Schlarigna GR
Languages	Census 1980		Census 1990		Census 2000	
Languages	Number	Percent	Number	Percent	Number	Percent
German	390	43.82%	535	54.87%	789	58.31%
Romansh	273	30.67%	198	20.31%	173	12.79%
Italian	178	20.00%	176	18.05%	261	19.29%
Population	890	100%	975	100%	1353	100%

== Heritage sites of national significance ==
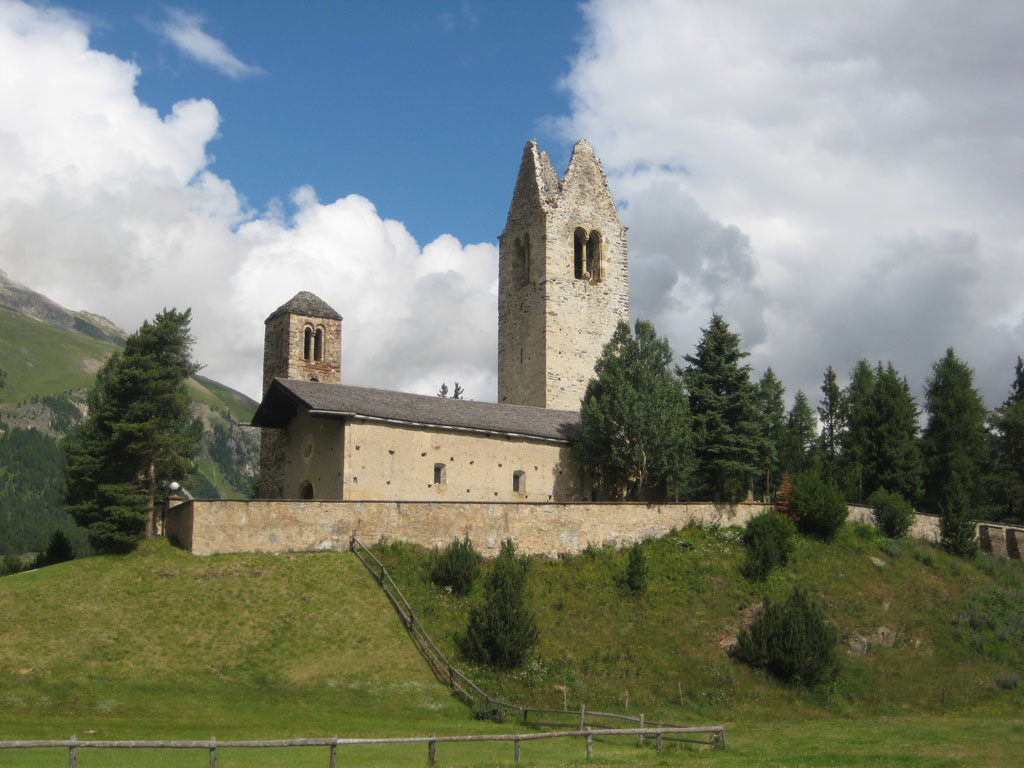
San Gian church with its ruined bell tower

The Swiss Reformed Church of San Gian is listed as a Swiss heritage site of national significance. The church is located on a hill above the Inn River. It was built in 1478 on the site of a chapel that was about 500 years older. The church is a single apse construction with a painted wood roof and notable frescoes. In 1682 the large bell tower was struck by lightning and the burned-out roof was never replaced.

== Tourism ==
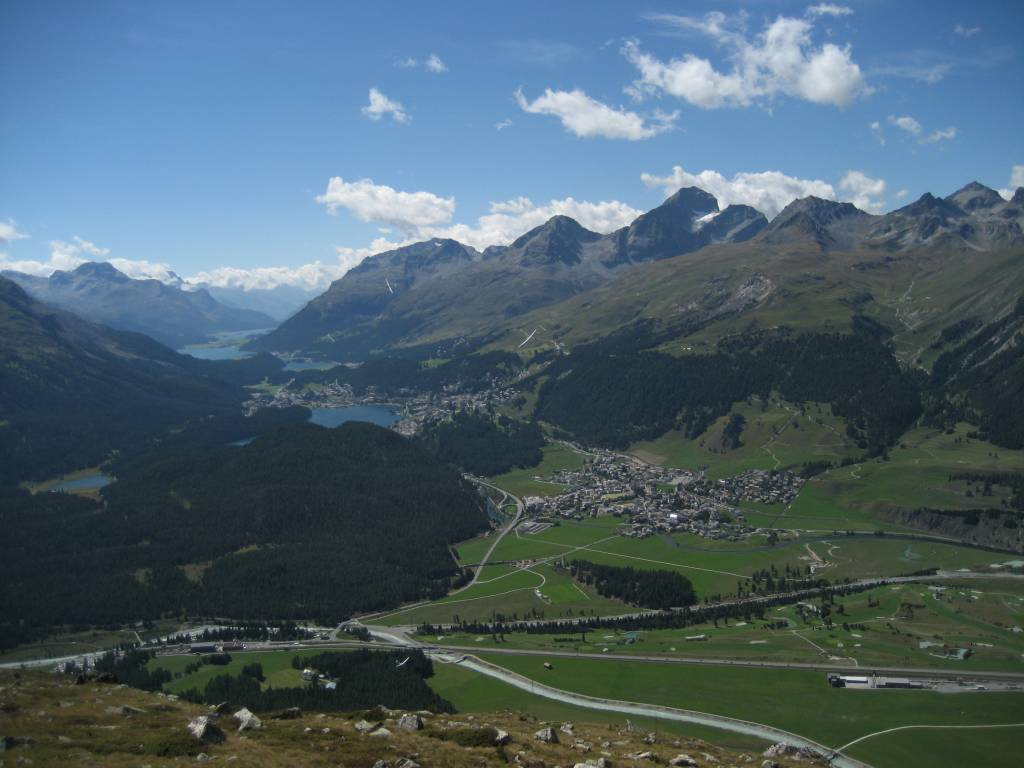
View of St Moritz and Celerina.

As Celerina/Schlarigna is located at the edge of the plain where the Flaz river (coming from the Bernina Pass) meets the Inn, this is the widest part of the Engadin valley, making Celerina the sunniest spot in the upper Engadin valley. Unlike St. Moritz, its more famous neighbouring town to the south-west, Celerina has retained many historic buildings in its town centre, many dating back to the 17th century. The town has three historic churches: the small Romanesque church in Cresta, the gothic church of San Gian (current structure dating to 1478, but based on a chapel at least 400 years older than that) in the middle of the plain, and the baroque-style, 1669 Bel Taimpel in the heart of the village.

Formerly a farming village, over the last few decades the importance of tourism has increased dramatically in Celerina/Schlarigna. There are no really big hotels, but a handful of medium and small hotels and inns. The core tourism, however, stems from vacation apartments, both owner-occupied second homes and temporary rentals. There is both summer and winter tourism. The winter season is more important. Summer guests enjoy hiking and mountaineering; mountain biking has also become popular. Nearby there are also opportunities for golf, glider flying, swimming and hang-gliding. Winter sports include both Nordic and alpine skiing, bobsleigh, and skeleton (the famous Cresta Run ends in Celerina). There is a direct skiers gondola from Celerina into the heart of the St.Moritz ski area of Corviglia/Marguns, a major portion of which lies in the municipality of Celerina/Schlarigna.

== Transportation ==
The municipality has three railway stations: Celerina, Celerina Staz, Punt Muragl Staz. All three are on lines of the Rhaetian Railway and between them have regular service to St. Moritz, Chur, Landquart, and Tirano.
