= Murn (river) =

Murn Murnbach
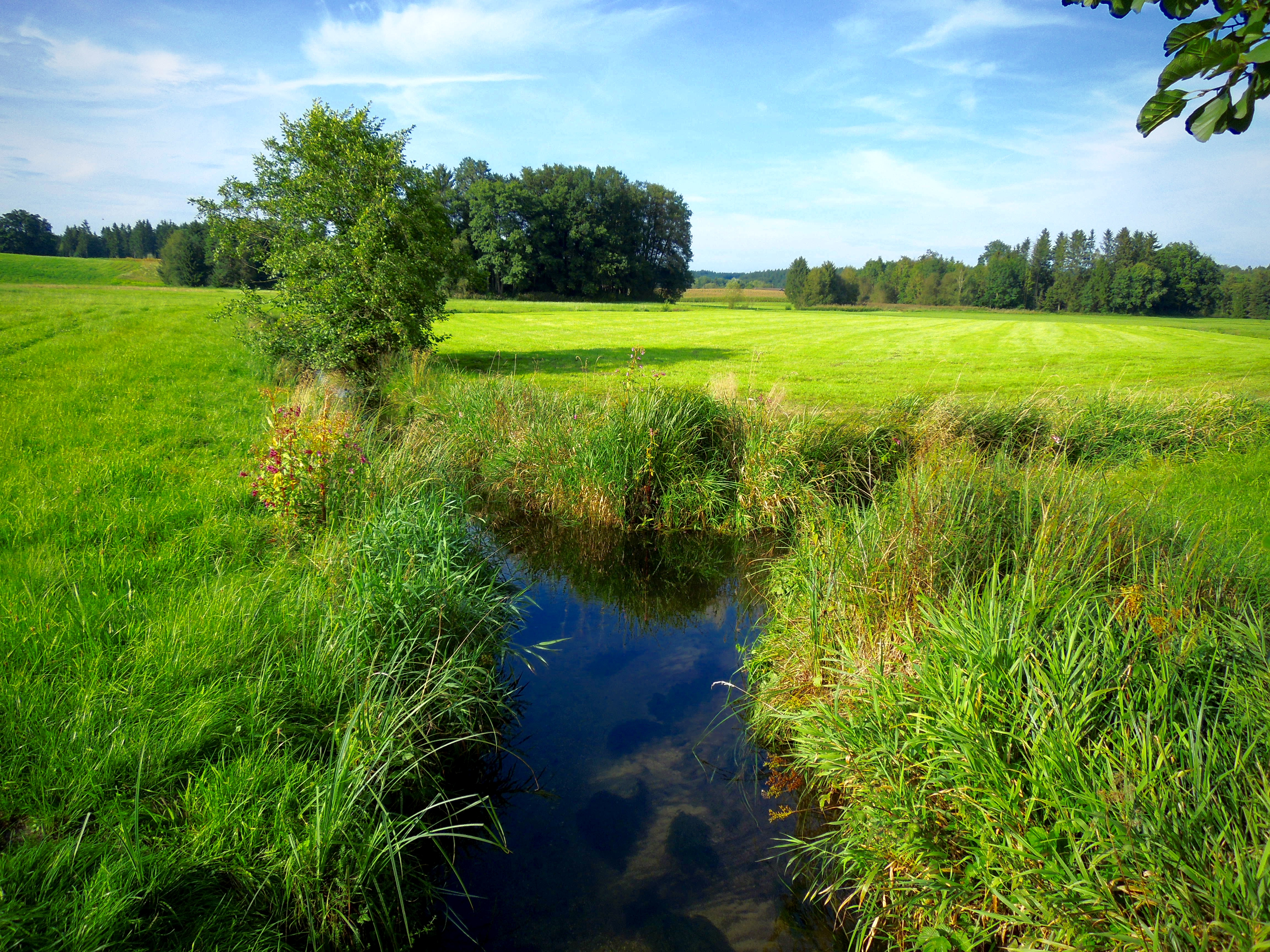
- The confluence of the Surbrunner Bach (from the left side) and the Surerbach (from the right side)

Location
- Country: Germany
- State: Bavaria

Physical characteristics
- Source
  - location: Kirchensur
- Mouth
  - location: Inn
  - coordinates: 47°58′38″N 12°09′10″E
- Length: 39.6 km (24.6 mi)
- Basin size: 179.14 km^{2} (69.17 sq mi)

Basin features
- Progression: Inn→ Danube→ Black Sea

The Murn is a river in Bavaria, Germany, and a right tributary of the river Inn.

== Name ==
The name "Murn" comes from the Bavarian word Mur (sand) and could be translated as "sand stream". Mur is a feminine word in German ("die Mur", plural: Murn ).

== Geography ==
The source of the Murn is the confluence of the two brooks Surerbach and Surbrunner Bach near Kirchensur, Landkreis Rosenheim. It starts to flow southward with the name Murnbach (German Bach means "brook") and is named Murn with increasing width. It changes direction several times until it finally flows northward into the Inn near Obermühl in the municipality of Griesstätt.
