= Pontresina railway station =

Swiss train station

Pontresina
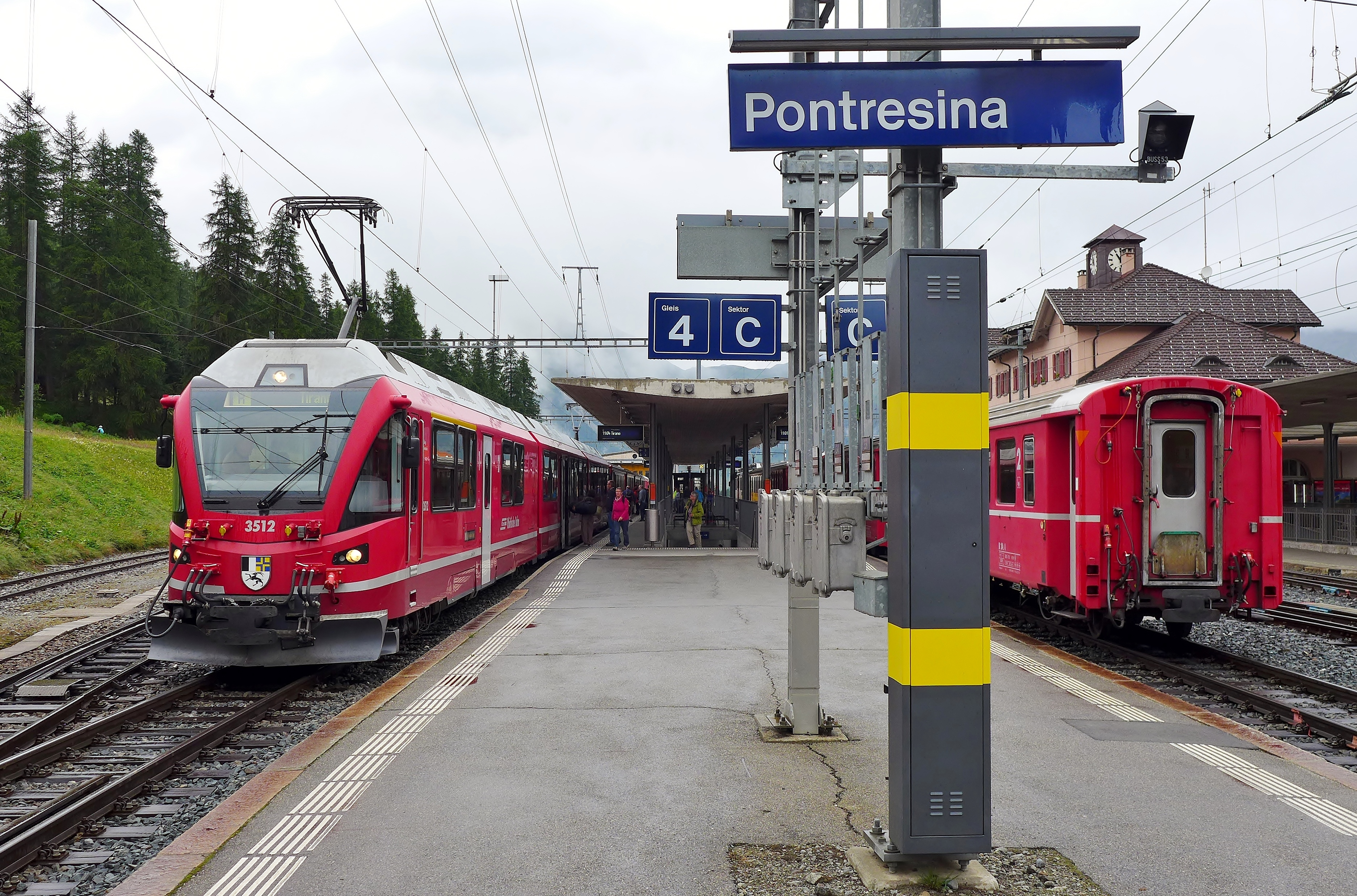
- Platforms 3 and 4 at the station in 2014

General information
- Location: Via de la Staziun; 7504 Pontresina; Pontresina; Switzerland
- Coordinates: 46°29′26″N 9°53′46″E
- Elevation: 1,773 m (5,817 ft)
- Owner: Rhaetian Railway
- Lines: Bernina line; Samedan–Pontresina line
- Distance: 103.0 km (64.0 mi) from Landquart; 5.8 km (3.6 mi) from St. Moritz
- Train operators: Rhaetian Railway
- Connections: PostAuto Schweiz and Engadin Bus

Other information
- Fare zone: 30 (Engadin Mobil)

History
- Opened: 1 July 1908

Passengers
- 2018: 1,800 per weekday

Services
Preceding station	Rhaetian Railway	Following station
Bergün/Bravuogn towards Chur	Bernina Express	Bernina Diavolezza towards Tirano
St. Moritz Terminus	Bernina Express	Bernina Diavolezza towards Tirano
Punt Muragl Staz towards St. Moritz	RE 9	Surovas towards Tirano
Punt Muragl Staz towards St. Moritz	R 19	Surovas towards Tirano
Terminus	R 15	Punt Muragl towards Scuol-Tarasp
Location

Pontresina railway station is a railway station in the municipality of Pontresina, in the Swiss canton of Graubünden. It is located at the junction of the Bernina and Samedan–Pontresina lines of the Rhaetian Railway.

The station has a large station building and seven through tracks, numbered 1 to 7, but only three of these are served by platforms. A side platform adjacent to the station building serves track 1, whilst an island platform, accessed by a pedestrian subway, serves tracks 3 and 4. Adjacent to the station is a seven track depot building, responsible for maintaining the snow clearance equipment used on the Bernina line.

== Services ==
As of the December 2023 timetable change, the following services stop at Pontresina:

- Bernina Express: Several round-trips per day between Chur or St. Moritz and Tirano.
- RegioExpress / Regio: hourly service between St. Moritz and Tirano.
- Regio: hourly service to Scuol-Tarasp.

== Layout ==
The line from Samedan is electrified using the Rhaetian Railway's standard 11 kV AC, but the Bernina line uses its own 1000 V DC electrification, which introduces some complications into the operation of the station. Tracks 1 and 2 are electrified at 11 kV AC and used by trains from Samedan terminating at Pontresina. Tracks 4 to 7 are electrified at 1000 V DC and used by trains operating between St Moritz and Tirano over the Bernina line. Track 3 has a switchable overhead line and can be used by trains on either line, as well as trains operating through between the two lines, such as Bernina Express trains between Chur and Tirano.

== See also ==
- Rail transport in Switzerland
