= Inn (river) =

River in Switzerland, Austria and Germany

Inn Romansh: En
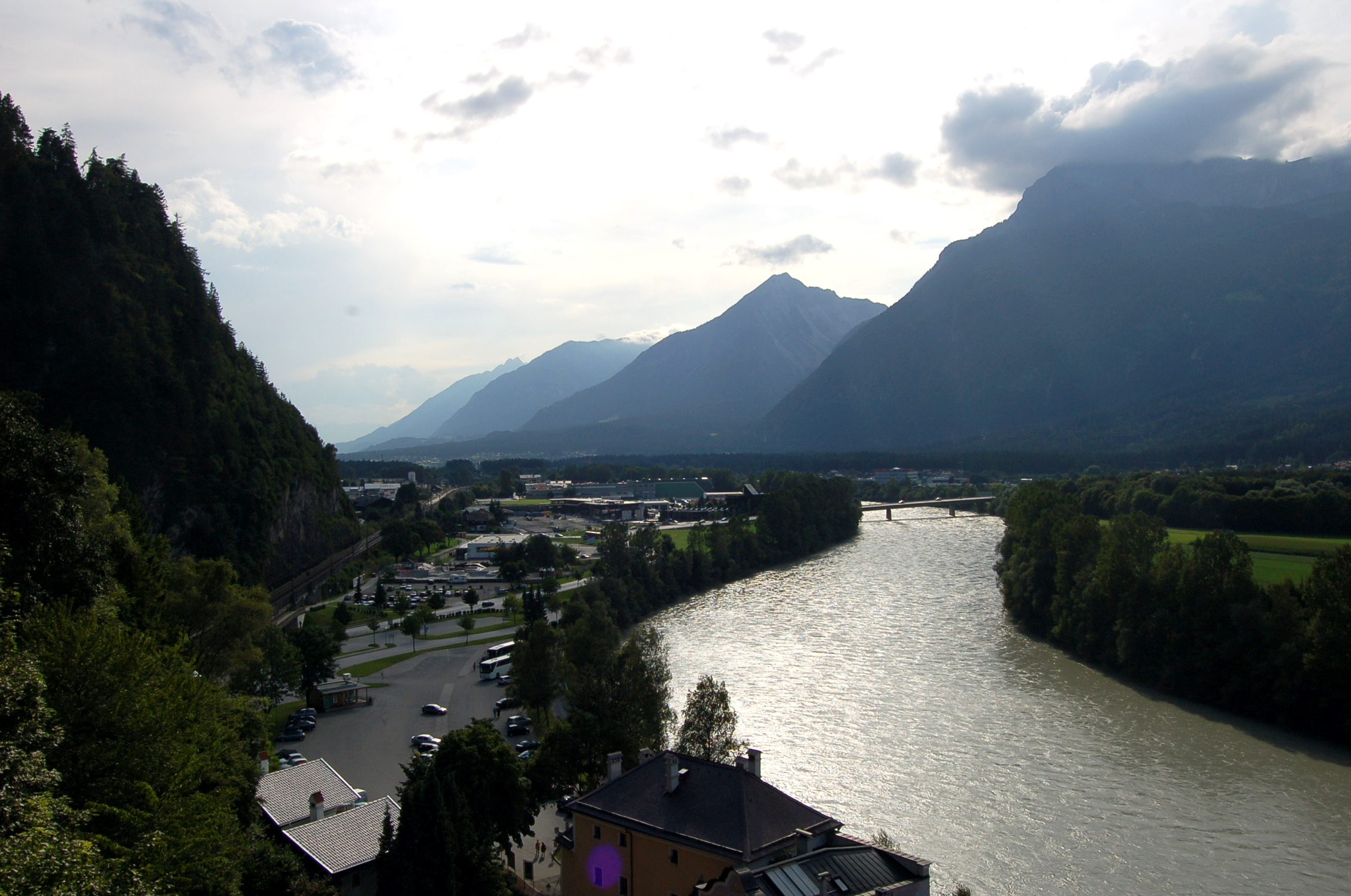
- Lower Inn valley from Rattenberg castle

Location
- Countries: Switzerland; Austria; Germany
- Cities: St. Moritz; Scuol; Landeck; Innsbruck; Wörgl; Kufstein; Rosenheim; Wasserburg am Inn; Mühldorf am Inn; Braunau am Inn; Schärding; Passau

Physical characteristics
- Source
  - location: Swiss Alps (Lägh dal Lunghin)
  - coordinates: 46.41673°N 9.67645°E
  - elevation: 2,484 m (8,150 ft)
- Mouth
  - location: Danube (Passau)
  - coordinates: 48.57353°N 13.47713°E
  - elevation: 291 m (955 ft)
- Length: 518.5 km (322.2 mi)
- Basin size: 26,053 km^{2} (10,059 sq mi)
- Discharge
  - location: mouth
  - average: 735 m^{3}/s (26,000 cu ft/s)

Basin features
- Progression: Danube→ Black Sea

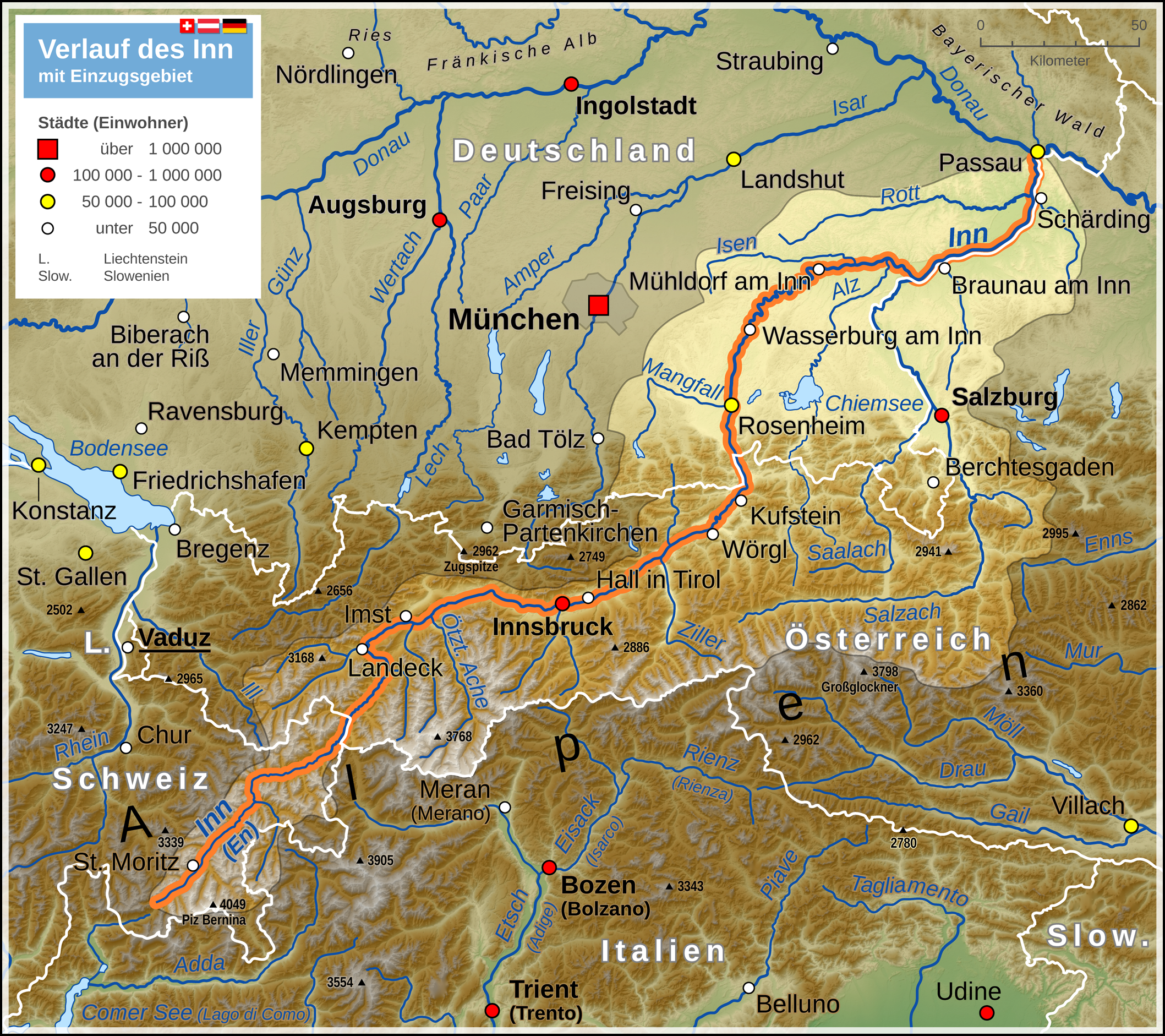
Map highlighting the Inn River

The Inn (German pronunciation: [ɪn]; Latin: Aenus; Romansh: En) is a river in Switzerland, Austria and Germany. The 518 km (322 mi) long river is a right tributary of the Danube, being the third largest tributary of the Danube by discharge. The highest point of its drainage basin is the summit of Piz Bernina at 4,049 m (13,284 ft). The Engadine, the valley of the En, is the only Swiss valley whose waters end up in the Black Sea (via the Danube).

== Etymology ==
The name Inn is derived from the old Celtic words en and enios, meaning water. In a document of 1338, the river was named Wasser (German for water). The first written mention from the years 105 to 109 (Publii Corneli Taciti historiarium liber tertius) reads: "... Sextilius Felix... ad occupandam ripam Aeni fluminis, quod Raetos Noricosque interfluit, missus..." ("... Sextilius Felix was sent to capture the banks of the Inn, which flows between the Rhaetian people and the Noric people.") The river is also mentioned by other authors of the Roman Empire as Ainos (Greek) or Aenus (Latin). In medieval Latin it was written as Enus or Oenus. The change in the old Bavarian language from e to i turned Enus to In. Until the 17th century, it was written In or Yn, but also Ihn or Yhn. The double-n appeared only in the 16th century, for example in the Tyrolian Landreim of 1557, and since the 18th century this spelling and pronunciation with a short vowel has been customary.

The mentions in Roman times refer to the lower course. The Tyrolean section was first called Aenus by Venantius Fortunatus in the 6th century. The name Engadin and the Romansh name En indicate that the upper reaches of the river have long been called this way. Even though it was occasionally believed that the Inn originated near the Adige at the Reschen Pass, since the 16th century at the latest the origin has been seen uniformly in the area of the lakes at the Maloja Pass.

A connection may exist between the name Inn and the name of the French river Ain.

== Geography ==
The source of the Inn is located in the Swiss Alps, west of St. Moritz in the Engadine region, which is named after the river (Romansh Engiadina; Latin vallis Eniatina). Shortly after it leaves its source, the Inn flows through the largest lakes on its course, Lake Sils and Lake Silvaplana. It runs north-eastwards, entering Austria, and from Landeck eastwards through the Austrian state of Tyrol and its capital, Innsbruck (bridge over the Inn), and crosses the border into Bavaria near Kufstein.

On Bavarian territory the river runs northwards and passes Rosenheim, Wasserburg am Inn, and Waldkraiburg; then it turns east, runs through Mühldorf and Neuötting and is enlarged by two major tributaries, the Alz and the Salzach. From here to the Danube, it forms the border between Germany (Bavaria) and Austria (Upper Austria). Towns on this last section of the river are Marktl am Inn, Simbach on Inn, Braunau am Inn and Schärding.

In Passau the Inn finally enters the Danube (as does the river Ilz there). Although the Inn has a greater average flow than the Danube when they converge in Passau, and its watershed contains the Piz Bernina, the highest point in the Danube watershed, the Inn is considered a tributary of the Danube, which has a greater length, drains a larger surface area, and has a more consistent flow. The Inn is the only river originating in Switzerland that ends in the Black Sea (via the Danube).

=== Tributaries ===
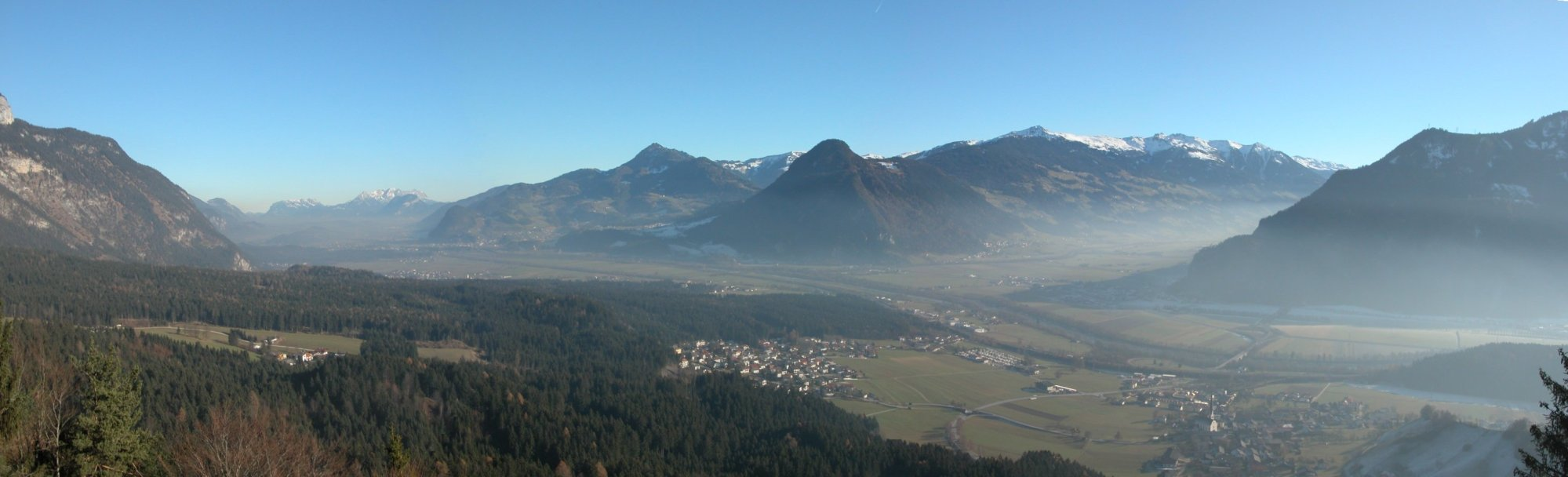
View of the Lower Inn Valley. On the right is the entrance to the Ziller Valley.

- Right tributaries (in downstream order): Flaz, Spöl, Clemgia, Faggenbach, Pitzbach, Ötztaler Ache, Melach, Sill, Ziller, Alpbach, Wildschönauer Ache, Brixentaler Ache, Weißache, Kaiserbach, Rohrdorfer Ache, Sims, Murn, Alz, Salzach, Enknach, Mattig, Ach, Hartbach, Antiesen, Pram
- Left tributaries (in downstream order; two different rivers called Rott exist): Beverin, Schergenbach, Sanna, Gurglbach, Höttinger Bach, Mühlauer Bach, Brandenberger Ache, Kieferbach, Auerbach, Kirchbach, Mangfall, Rott, Attel, Isen, Rott

== Flow ==
The average discharge at the mouth of the Inn is 735 m^{3}/s (26,000 cu ft/s).

Average monthly flow (m^{3}/s) of the Inn in Passau
Years 1921/2006

=== 2013 flood ===
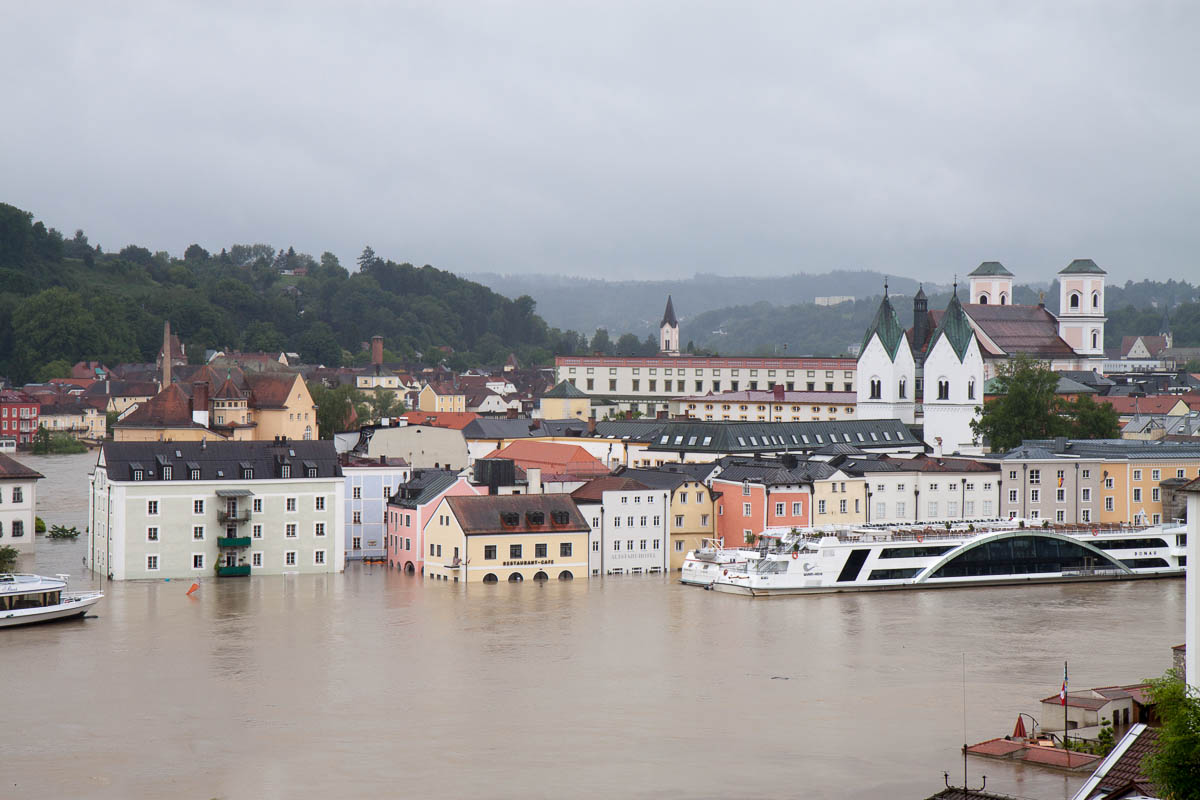
The Old City of Passau during the flood

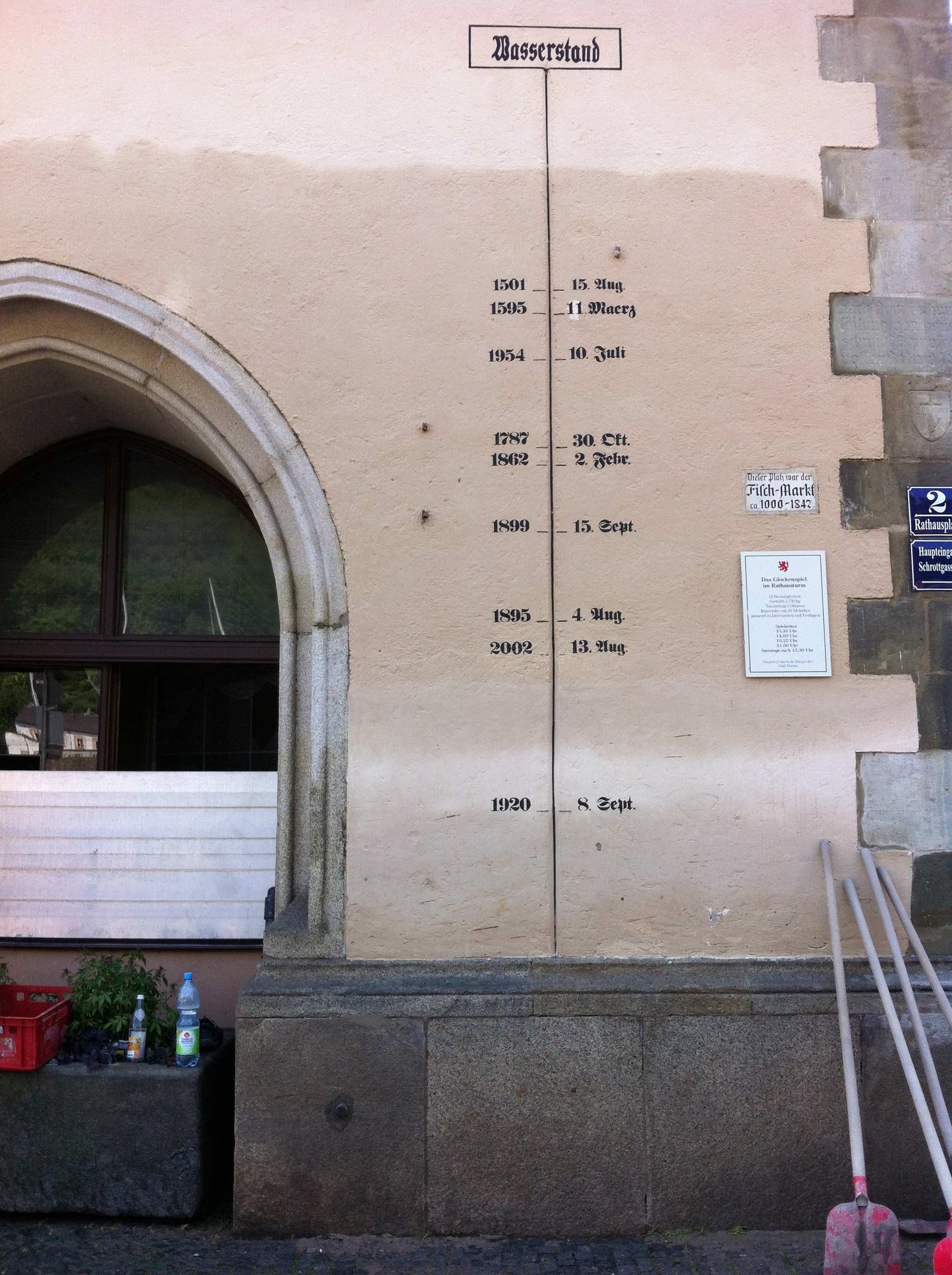
Water level marks on the Town Hall in Passau

On 3 June 2013 the discharge of the Inn in Passau reached 6,820 m^{3}/s (241,000 cu ft/s) and the water levels reached 12.85 m (42.2 ft), the highest recorded historic flood level since 1501. The historic centre of Passau, where the Danube, Inn and Ilz converge, was flooded severely.

== Hydroelectric power plants ==
Currently, there are 24 hydroelectric power plants on the Inn. 17 of them are operated by Verbund AG. The power plants are listed beginning at the headwaters:

Dam	Nameplate capacity (MW)	Annual generation (Mio. kwh)
Islas	4.3	17
Ova Spin	50	100
Pradella	288	1,000
Martina	70	290
Imst	89	550
Kirchbichl	19.3	131
Langkampfen	31.5	169
Oberaudorf-Ebbs	60	268
Nussdorf	48	245.8
Rosenheim	35	179.5
Feldkirchen	38	204
Wasserburg	29	165.7
Teufelsbruck	25	150.4
Gars	30	169.2
Jettenbach	6	30.2
Töging	85	564.6
Neuötting	26	159.4
Perach	19	128.4
Stammham	23	136.4
Braunau-Simbach	100	550
Ering-Frauenstein	72	434
Egglfing-Obernberg	84	485
Schärding-Neuhaus	96	541.8
Passau-Ingling	86	504.7

== See also ==
- List of rivers of Austria
- List of rivers of Germany
- List of rivers of Switzerland
