= Flaz =

River in Switzerland

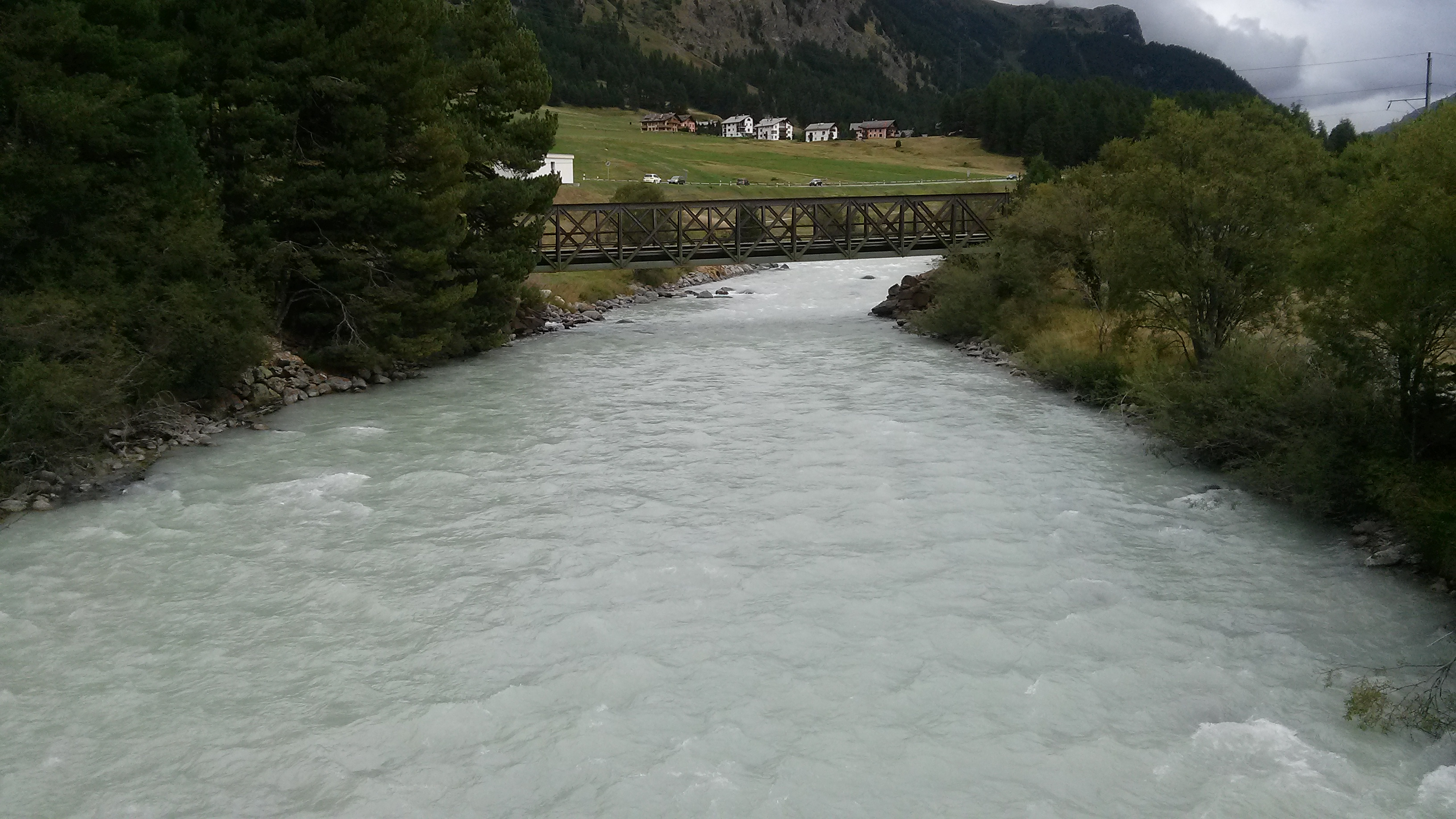
- Flaz in Engadin

Location
- Country: Switzerland

Physical characteristics
- Source
  - location: Confluence of Roseg and Bernina
- Mouth
  - location: Inn
  - coordinates: 46°32′36″N 9°53′32″E
- Basin size: Danube

Basin features
- Progression: Inn→ Danube→ Black Sea

The Flaz is a river in the Swiss region of Engadin. It is a right tributary of the Inn. The Flaz starts at the confluence of Bernina with Roseg; after that Flaz flows in the territory of Pontresina and Samedan where its waters reaches the Inn.
