= Samedan–Pontresina railway =

Narrow gauge railway line in canton of Graubünden, Switzerland

Samedan–Pontresina
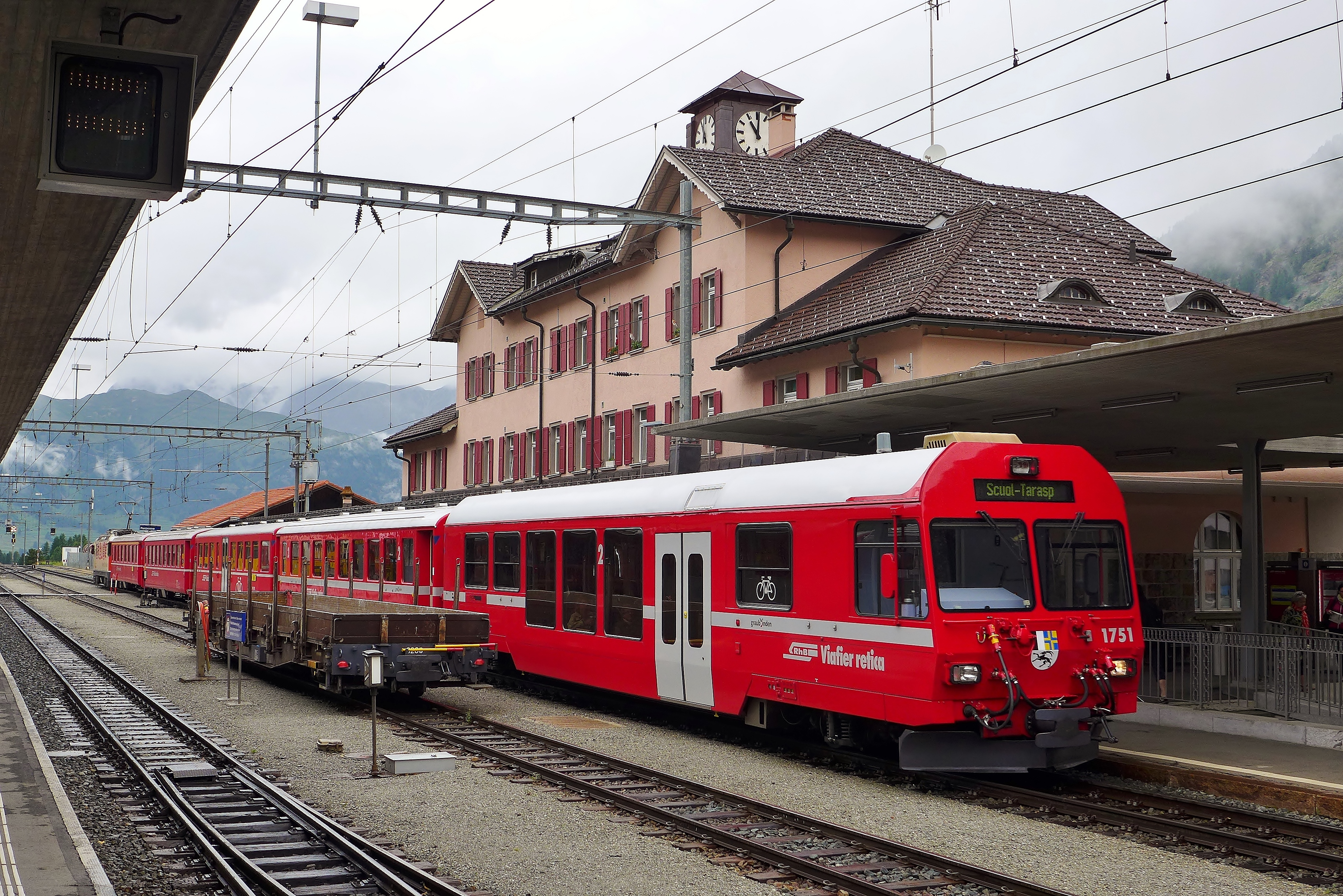
- Train to Samedan-Scoul-Tarasp in Pontresina station

Overview
- Owner: Rhaetian Railway
- Line number: 960
- Termini: Samedan; Pontresina

Technical
- Line length: 5.293 km (3.289 mi)
- Number of tracks: 1
- Track gauge: 1,000 mm (3 ft 3 3/8 in) metre gauge
- Electrification: 11 kV 16.7 Hz AC overhead catenary
- Maximum incline: 2.6%

The Samedan–Pontresina railway is a Swiss metre-gauge railway, which is operated by the Rhaetian Railway (Rhätischen Bahn; RhB). The line runs through the Upper Engadine and connects Samedan with Pontresina and provides a link between the Albula Railway and the Bernina Railway. The line is also often considered to be part of the Engadine line from Bever to Scuol-Tarasp with which it is closely linked operationally. The Samedan-Pontresina railway line is part of the RhB mainline network, so the kilometrage (chainage) has its zero point in Landquart.

== History ==
The railway line was opened by the Berninabahn-Gesellschaft (Bernina Railway Company) together with the Pontresina–Morteratsch section on 1 July 1908. It was the only connection until 1 July 1909 between the RhB trunk network and the Bernina Railway, which was already electrified but with direct current. The Samedan–Pontresina line was electrified with 11 kV 16 2/3 Hz AC in 1913.

== Operations ==
Pontresina station is a two-system station. The trains from Samedan uses tracks 1 and 2 and the trains on the Bernina Railway use tracks 4 to 7. Track 3 has a switchable overhead line and is used for example by the Bernina Express from Chur to Tirano and the so-called Heidiexpress. This allows the entry and exit of trains under the required power system as well as changing system used in the station.
