= Preda =

Village in Grisons canton, Switzerland

- Municipality
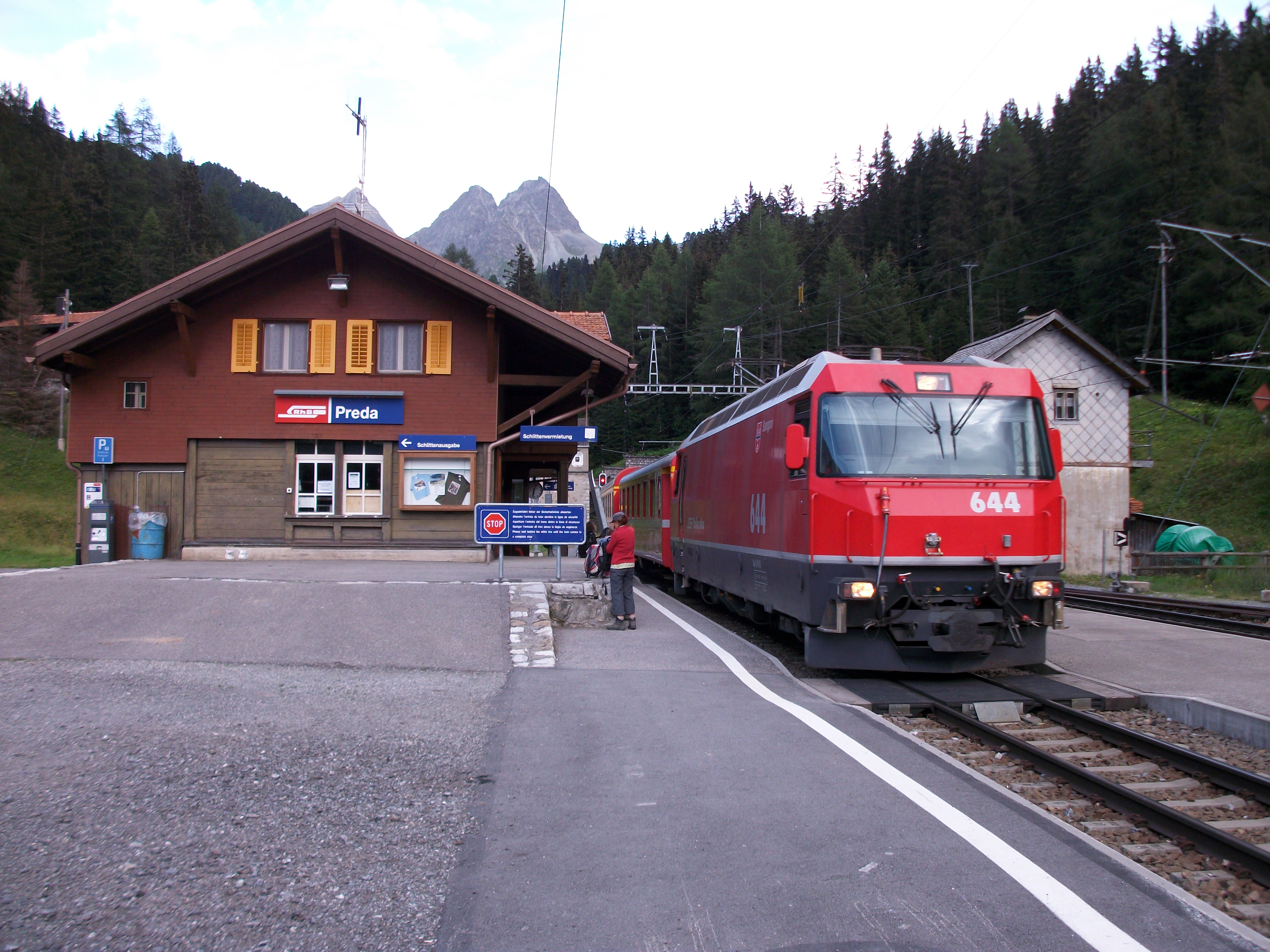
- Railway station in Preda with an electrified regional RegioExpress (RE) train

- Flag Coat of arms
- Location of Preda
- Location within Switzerland Location within Canton of Grisons
- Coordinates: 46.588328°N 9.777218°E
- Country: Switzerland
- Canton: Grisons
- District: Albula
- Municipality: Bergün Filisur
- Elevation: 1,789 m (5,869 ft)
- Time zone: UTC+01:00 (CET)
  - Summer (DST): UTC+02:00 (CEST)
- Postal code: 7482
- SFOS number: 3521
- ISO 3166 code: CH-GR
- Surrounded by: Bergün
- Website: www.berguenfilisur.ch

Preda is a small village within the Swiss municipality of Bergün Filisur (until the end of 2017 Bergün/Bravuogn), district of Albula, Canton Graubünden (Grisons), in the East of Switzerland.

The name Preda, like Prada, derives from the Latin pratum = meadow.

Preda is located in the upper valley of the Albula Alps. It lies on the road over the Albula Pass at 1789 metres above sea level (a.s.l.) and at the north portal of the Albula Tunnel of the Rhaetian Railway. To reach Preda, while avoiding too steep ramps, the Rhaetian Railway needs passing several valleys over impressive viaducts and cross-cutting the mountain in several spiralling tunnels (Kehrtunnel in German). This allows the railway to overcome a difference in altitude of 416 metres from Bergün to Preda. The line runs from Chur or Davos to St. Moritz and ends at the route of the Glacier Express.

== Infrastructures ==
The Preda railway station is an important crossing point for the trains on the Rhaetian Railway: It has a long double-track line and shunting area with sidings. In summer 2014, the construction works of the Albula Tunnel began to make a 2nd tube.

Since the construction of the railway line, Preda also benefits from a hydroelectric power station supplied with water through a tunnel from Lake Palpuogna.

The Preda hamlet has a hotel, a guest and group house, a farm, and several chalets.

== Geography and soil occupation ==
Historical aerial photograph by Werner Friedli, 1947

East of Preda, at the 2312-metre-high Albula Pass, lies the drainage divide between the Rhine river (North Sea drainage basin) and the Inn river (Black Sea basin).

The valley floor is used for agriculture. Above there are extensive wooded areas. Beyond the tree line are several alps.

In the immediate vicinity of Preda, down the valley, is located the intermediate Alpine pasture settlement (Maiensäss) Naz. The place is located one kilometre west of the Preda hamlet at an altitude of 1,747 m above sea level in the Albula Valley, at the entrance to the left side valley, Val Mulix. Today it is mainly used as a holiday resort.

== Snow sport and summer activities ==
=== Sledging ===

The sledging Preda-Bergün and Darlux-Bergün is a popular winter sport in the area. When the pass above Preda is closed in the winter and there is sufficient snow, the road below Preda to Bergün serves as a toboggan run for sleds (longest natural toboggan run in Europe). The sledders and their sledges are transported to Preda by regular trains and additional "sledge trains". In winter there is also a snowshoe trail at Preda.

=== Hiking ===

In the summer, there are numerous hiking trails. Preda is the starting point of a 7 km long railway trail to Bergün, which mostly follows the railway line down the valley.

== Rhaetian Railway and the spectacular Albula line ==

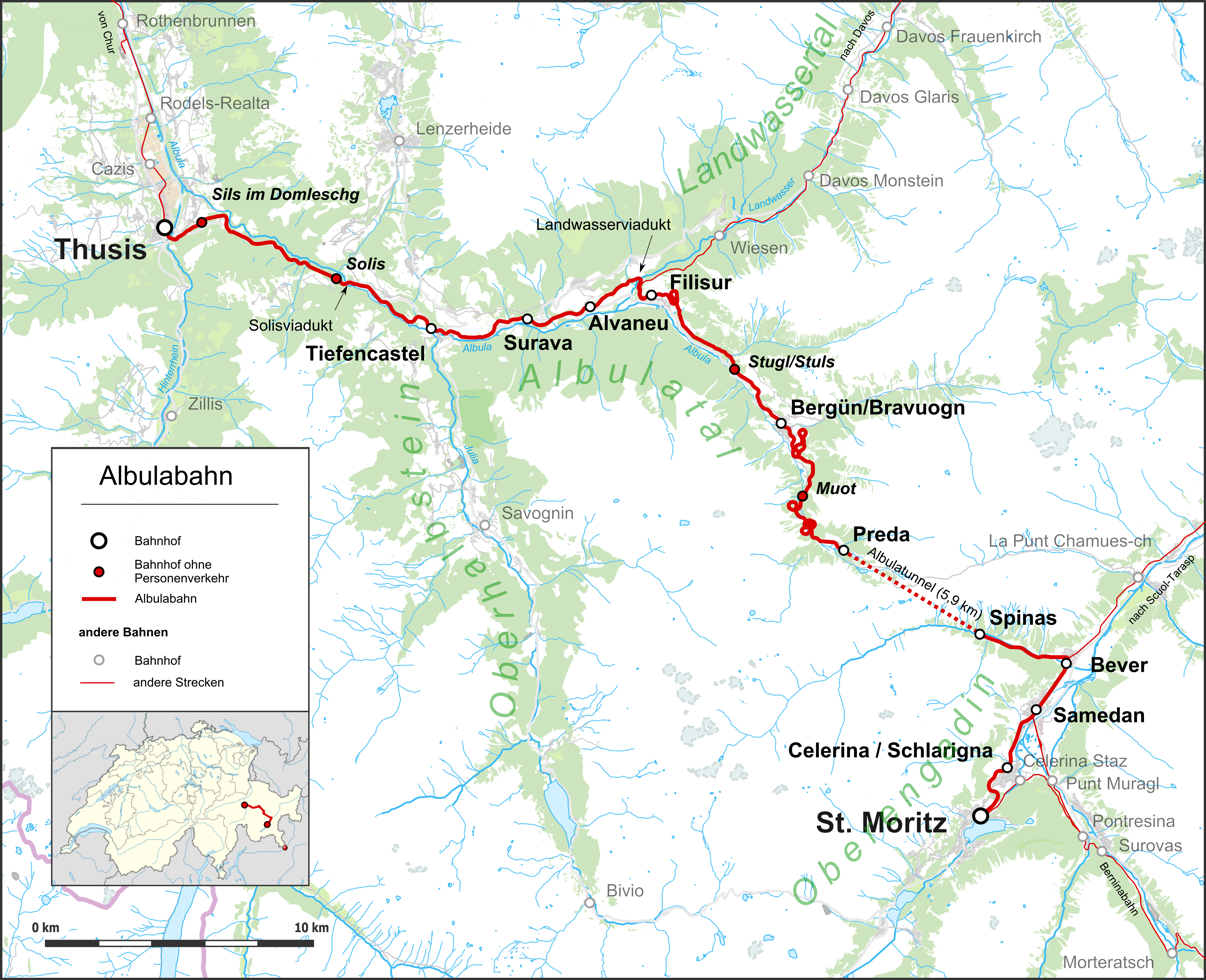
Albula Railway map

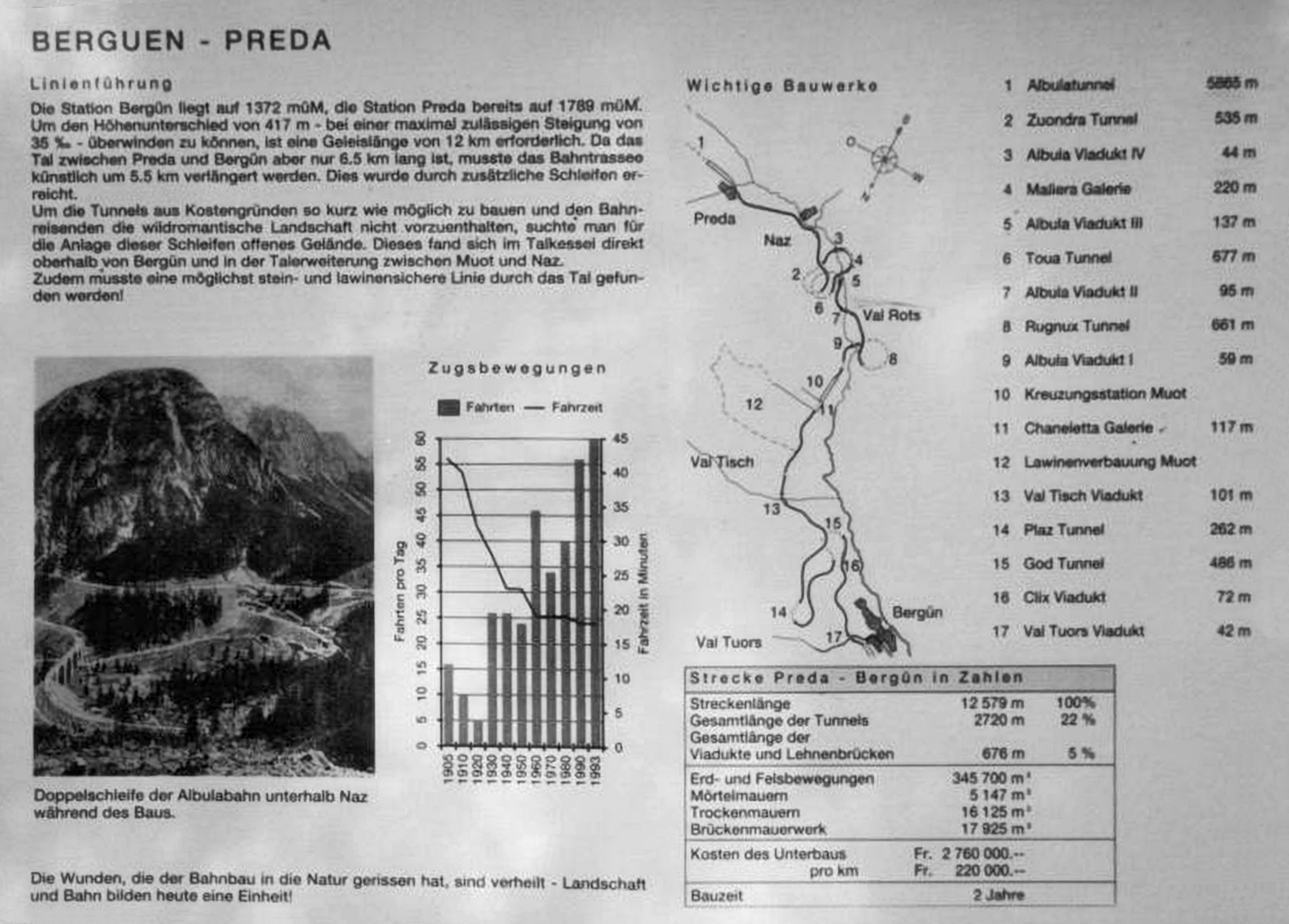
Albula Railway construction works

The Rhaetian Railway (German: Rhätische Bahn; French: Chemin de fer rhétique; Italian: Ferrovia retica; Romansh: Viafier retica), abbreviated RhB, is a Swiss transport company owning the largest network of all private railway operators in Switzerland.

Headquartered in Chur, the RhB operates all the railway lines of the Swiss canton of Grisons, except two lines.

The construction of the Albula Railway begun in September 1898 under the supervision of the German-Swiss civil engineer Friedrich Hennings, a pioneer of railway construction in Switzerland. The line was opened on 1 July 1903 and its extension to St. Moritz started operations on 10 July 1904.

Because at its conception, the Albula line was intended to be operated by steam locomotives and that their power was still restricted at this time, it was necessary to limit the slope of the railway to maximum 3.5% (gradient of 3.5 m altitude over a distance of 100 m).

The ascent of the valley between Bergün/Bravuogn and Preda was especially problematic. There, over a distance of 5 km as the crow flies, it was necessary to overcome a difference in altitude of more than 400 m. Friedrich Hennings, the designer of the Albula line, had to devise a complex succession of curved or spiral tunnels and viaducts in order to lengthen the path of the railway by 12 km to respect the maximum value of the slope (< 3.5 %) imposed by engineering constraints. Two curved tunnels, three spiral tunnels, and a number of bridges were needed to solve the engineering problem, by winding the track around like the thread of a screw. Elegant, but robust, viaducts were constructed over the valleys to connect the tunnels.

Beyond Preda, the centrepiece of the line is the 5,866 m long Albula Tunnel, which passes under the watershed between the Rhine and the Danube, a few kilometres west of the Albula Pass.

Today, the Rhaetian Railway continues to serve several famous touristic destinations, such as St. Moritz and Davos. The Rhaetian Railway provides services to the Preda station. Preda is on the railway line between Chur and St. Moritz. InterRegio trains deliver hourly service while Regio trains offer a more limited service between Chur and St. Moritz.

In 2008, the RhB section from the Albula-Bernina area, including St. Moritz, was added to the list of UNESCO World Heritage Sites.

In 2011, the Albula-Bernina line was the first rail line in the world to be photographed by Google and put on Google Street View. The line is electrified, but RhB sometimes also operates several historic (steam, or diesel) trains on the network.

In 2022, to celebrate the 175th anniversary of Switzerland's first railway, the Rhaetische Bahn, supported by the Swiss train-builder Stadler Rail, came together to run the world's longest-ever passenger train, composed of 100 cars (2,990 tonnes) stretching almost two kilometres long (1,906 metres). The record-breaking train convoy was formed of 25 "Capricorn" electric trains. It took about an hour to cover 25 kilometres (16 mi) over the spectacular Albula Line from Preda to Alvaneu.

Rhaetian Railway (Rhätische Bahn, RhB) between Filisur, Bergün and Preda: Viaducts and spiral tunnels
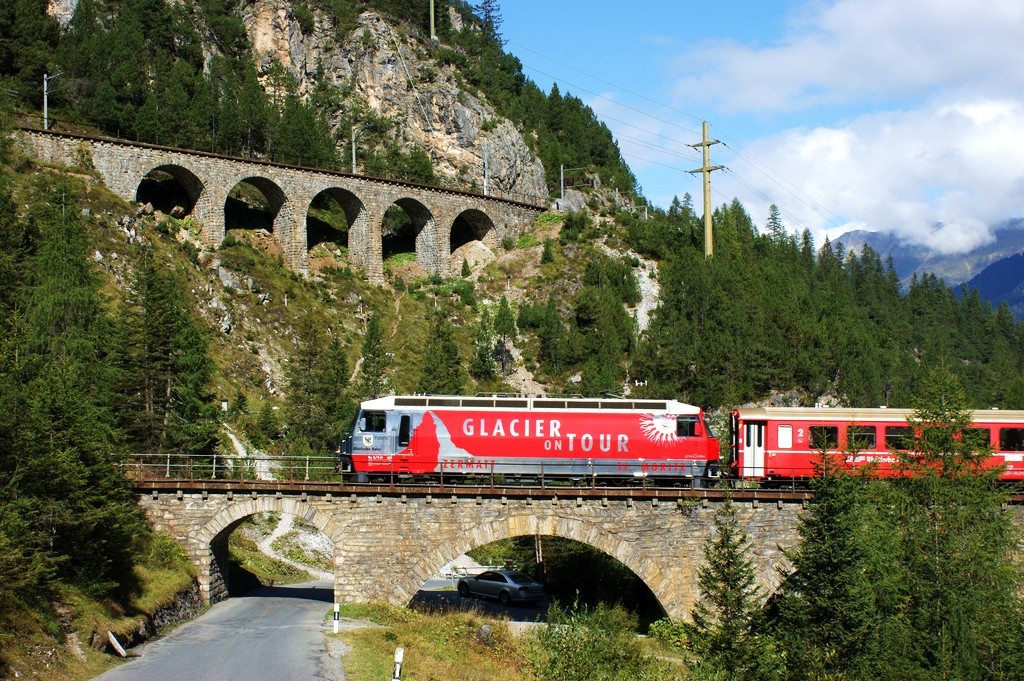
A Rhaetian Railway (Rhätische Bahn, RhB) train amidst the helical tunnels.

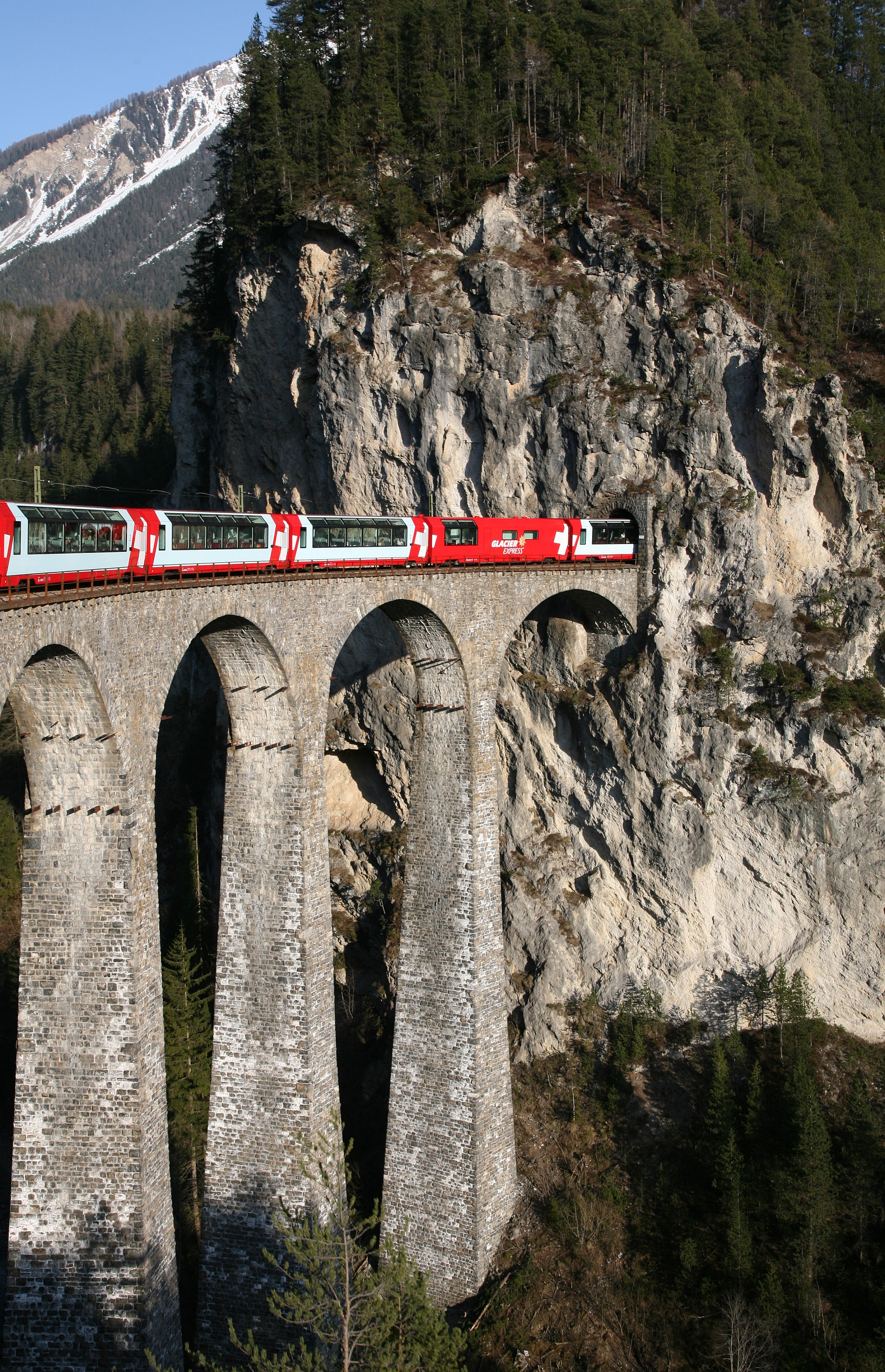
Rhaetian Railway Glacier Express on the Landwasser Viaduct near Filisur entering the Landwasser tunnel.

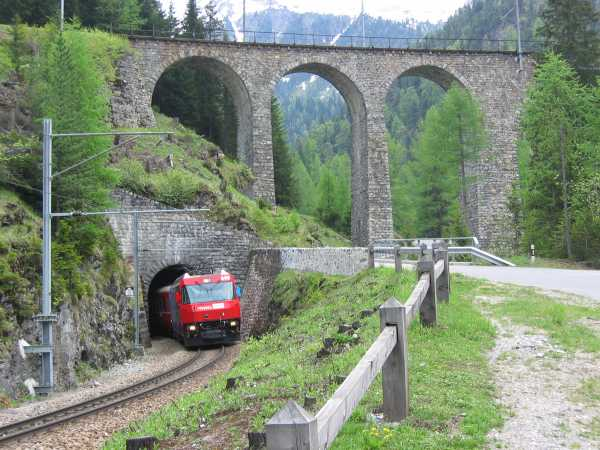
Route of the Albula Railway from Preda to Bergün: Toua spiral tunnel.

== See also ==
- Albula Pass
- Albula Railway
- Albula Railway Museum
- Albula Tunnel
- Albula Valley
- Preda railway station
- Spiral (railway)
