= Albula Tunnel =

Railway tunnel in Switzerland

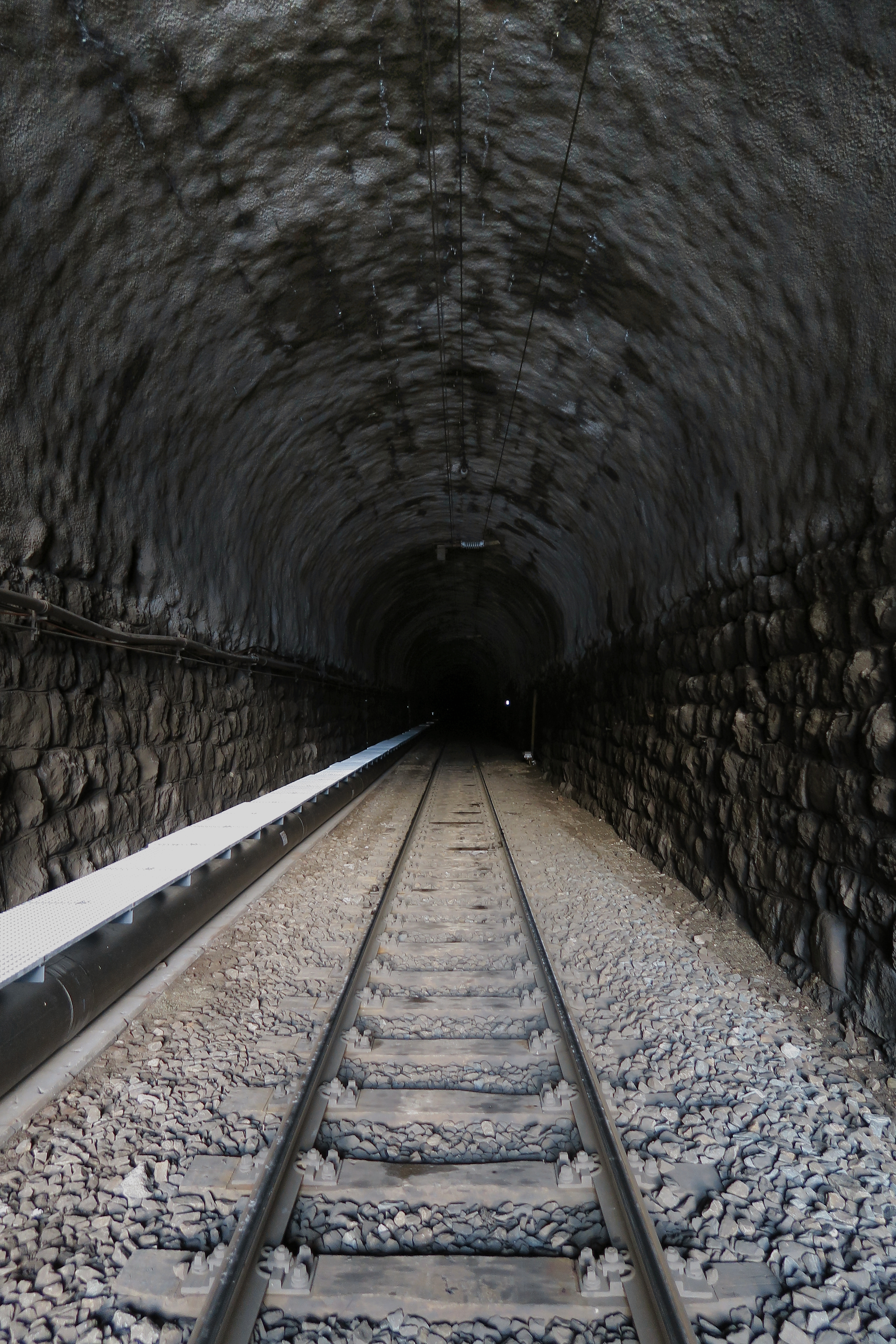
- View from the Spinas portal
- Interactive map of Albula Tunnel

Overview
- Line: Albula Railway
- Location: Albula, Graubünden, Switzerland
- Coordinates: 46°34′30″N 9°48′32″E
- Status: Open
- System: Rhaetian Railway

Operation
- Work began: 1898
- Opened: 1 July 1903
- Owner: Rhaetian Railway
- Operator: Rhaetian Railway
- Traffic: Train
- Character: Passenger and freight

Technical
- Length: 5,865 m (3.644 mi)
- No. of tracks: Single track
- Track gauge: 1,000 mm (3 ft 3 3/8 in)
- Electrified: Overhead catenary, 11 kV AC 16 2/3 Hz
- Max elevation: 1,820 m (5,970 ft) above sea level

The Albula Tunnel is the centrepiece of the Albula Railway, which forms part of the Rhaetian Railway network, in the Canton of Graubünden, Switzerland. With its maximum elevation of 1,820 m (5,970 ft) above sea level, it is amongst the highest tunnels in the Alps, and has a mountain overlay of up to 950 m (3,120 ft). The original tunnel has a length of 5,865 m (3.644 mi) and was opened for traffic in 1903.

The northern portal of the tunnel is at Preda, in Bergün Filisur, and the southern portal at Spinas, in the Bever valley. At a total length of 5,865 m (3.644 mi), the tunnel connects the Albula Valley with the Engadin Valley, and, in so doing, passes under the watershed between the Rhine and the Danube a few kilometres west of the Albula Pass. The tunnel serves both passenger and freight traffic. The Glacier Express passes through it daily. During the winter season, car transporter trains operating between Thusis and Samedan also used the tunnel until 2011.

Due to the threat of rockfalls and general deterioration over time, it was planned for the original tunnel to have been renovated during the 2020s. But in 2010, the Rhaetian Railway announced that it had identified the construction of a second tunnel alongside the first as its preferred option, with one of several reasons being a relatively minor difference in cost. Costed at around CHF 244 million, construction commenced during 2014. In comparison to the original Albula Tunnel, the new bore is considerably larger due to newer operational and safety standards. The second tunnel was opened to traffic on June 12, 2024, with completion of the project including refurbishment of the original tunnel by 2025. Once completed, around 15,000 trains are predicted to use the tunnel each year; it has been built to allow for a maximum speed of 120 km/h (75 mph).

== History ==
=== Construction ===
The Albula Tunnel is a major feature of the Rhaetian Railway (RhB), an extensive metre-gauge network in the southeast of Switzerland that was launched during 1889. The railway's management had placed a significant emphasis on the line being attractive to the growing tourism market, thus the line traverses the northern valleys in a deliberately spectacular manner. The highest point of the line, being roughly 1,800 metres (5,900 ft) above sea level, is where the Albula tunnel was constructed.

The construction effort was impacted by multiple unusual problems. The cold, 6 °C (42.8 °F), water outflows transformed the already fractured rock into a pulpy mass, regularly clogging up the shell of the northern tunnel lead (or adit). At the same time, a strong water source above the northern tunnel portal dried up. The water streaming in at 300 L/s (66 impgal/s; 79 USgal/s) had to be painstakingly diverted with pipelines. As a result, construction virtually came to a standstill: in the ten weeks from May 1900, only two metres (6.6 ft) of tunnel were driven. These difficulties could not be overcome by the head construction contractor Ronchi & Carlotti, which entered into bankruptcy.

From 1 April 1901, the Rhaetian Railway took the construction work into its own hands. With the use of a bonus system, it was able to regain part of the lost time. At 03:00 hours on 29 May 1902, the breakthrough of the two tunnel leads was achieved, at a point 3,030.5 m (9,943 ft) from the north portal, and 2,835 m (9,301 ft), from the south portal.

The finished tunnel had a length of 5,864 metres and contained a single track. It cost 7,828,000 Swiss francs to build. A total of 1,316 people were employed in the tunnel's construction. Overall, there were 16 fatal accidents involving construction workers; a stone memorial to commemorate these victims has been placed at the Preda station.

On July 1, 1903, the tunnel was opened to traffic. Early working of the tunnel was by steam locomotives, however both it and the entire route were later electrified using the standardised 11 kV, 16 2/3Hz system. Various passenger services use the tunnel on a routine basis, such as the luxurious Glacier Express. According to industry publication Rail Engineer, the danger posed by rock falls became ever-present towards the latter half of the twentieth century.

By 2006, inspections of the tunnel determined its condition to have degraded to the point where significant renovations were required. By this time, around 7.4 million passengers, including 2.3 million commuters, along with a high volume of freight traffic, was using the tunnel every year, thus any closure would have been highly disruptive. In June 2009, the Rhaetian Railway announced that it was conducting investigations into either fundamental modernisation or reconstruction of the tunnel.

While a second tunnel was constructed during the 2010s, the original Albula Tunnel has been retained. A total of 12 cross passages are to be excavated between the two tunnels, which shall enable personnel to travel between either bore, useful during emergency situations and routine maintenance activities alike. Following the completion of the second tunnel, the older tunnel has been scheduled to be temporarily closed to rail traffic while extensive repair works are carried out; this activity is to be largely focused on the stabilisation of its walls and roof.

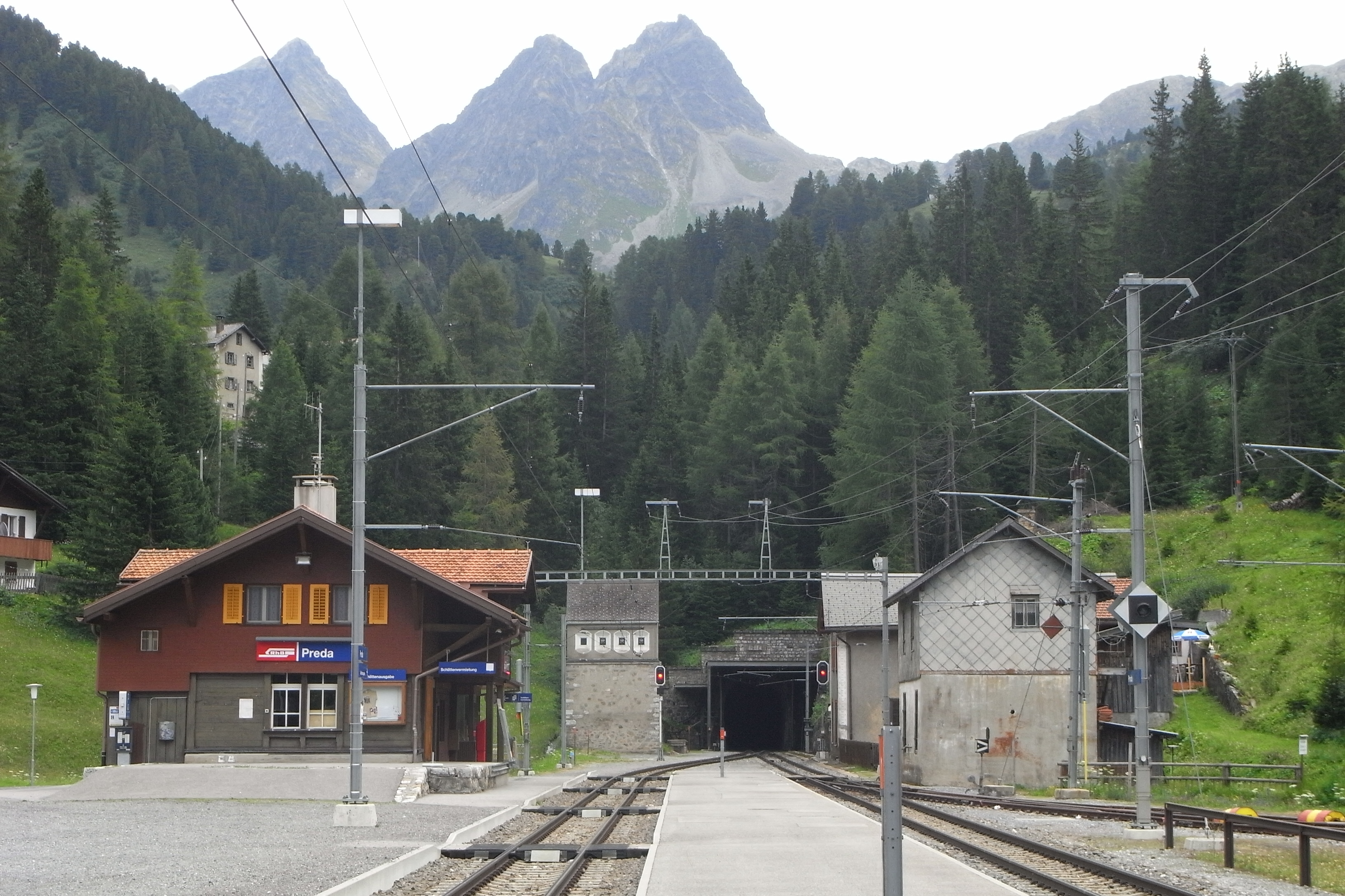
Preda station and the northern tunnel portal (1,789 m [5,869 ft] a.s.l.).

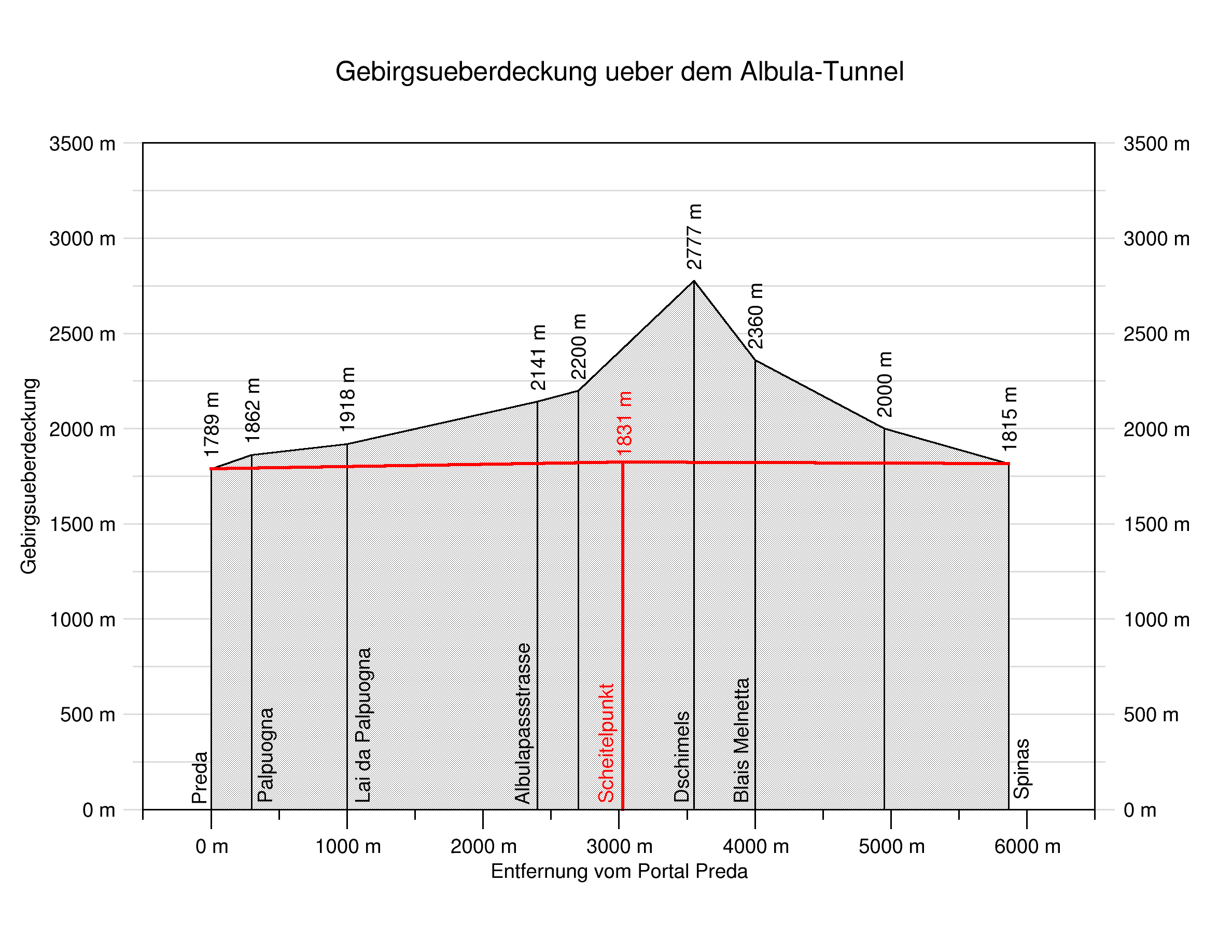
Mountain overlay above the Albula Tunnel.

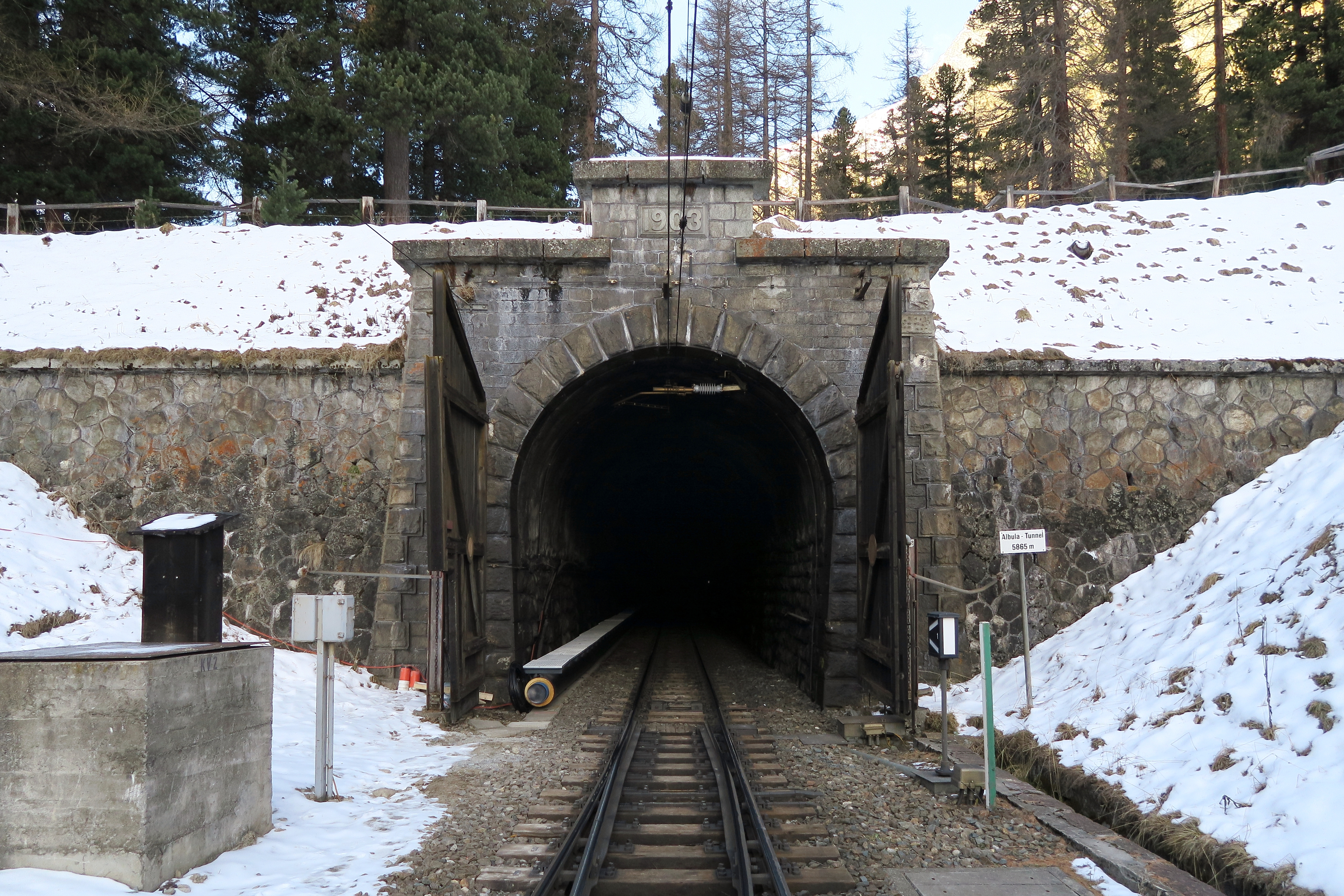
Southern tunnel portal from Spinas station (1,815 m [5,955 ft] a.s.l.).

== Second tunnel ==
Due to the declining condition of the original tunnel, the prospects for the construction of a brand new tunnel alongside the old was evaluated alongside other options; Studies determined that the total cost of such a tunnel would be around CHF 244 million. During 2010, the RHB announced that the building of a new tunnel had been identified as the optimal solution; detailed planning work commenced that same year. There were several advantages presented by this option. Most obviously, the old tunnel would be able to remain in use throughout the construction of the new tunnel, thus avoiding a lengthy closure of the line for its renovation. The presence of the existing tunnel also enabled it to act as a rescue bore for the new tunnel if ever required to do so. During December 2012, RhB handed over the plans for approval to the Federal Office of Transport. Close cooperation between RhB and authorities is necessary, particularly due to the location being an UNESCO-recognised World Heritage Site.

During 2014, construction of the second tunnel formally commenced. In comparison to the original Albula Tunnel, the new bore is considerably large in terms of both width and height, which is primarily a result of the need to implement various newer operating standards and a greater consideration on its safety. The larger dimensions of the tunnel enables it to accommodate walkways throughout its length, as well as facilitating ideal clearances for the OLE fixtures. During its construction, the bore was sufficiently large and flat enough for road vehicles to directly reach the rock face, enabling conventional machinery to be brought in. Despite its increased width, the new tunnel is actually slightly shorter than the original bore, being roughly 5,860 m (19,230 ft) in length.

The tunnelling method was in line with conventional practices of the time. Construction sites were established at each of the future portals of the tunnel, which accommodated conveyor systems for moving excavated spoil from the tunnel bore to rail sidings for removal. The boring involved a pattern of drilling, blasting, spoil removal, and ancillary safety inspections. Fresh air was piped up to the rock face, creating a slightly higher pressure within the tunnel to help blow out both dust and diesel fumes being emitted by the excavation activities. Channels were also driven to handle water ingress, while both the roof and walls of the bore were stabilised via the application of wet-mix concrete.

Whilst the geology surrounding the tunnel is principally granite, a 110 m (360 ft) section close to the Preda end consists of three different types of rock, known as cellular dolomite, while a 20 m (66 ft) section is largely dominated by a soft and porous type of dolomite akin to fine sand. Due to the absence of solid material, the risk of tunnel collapse was notably elevated during this section's construction. It was stabilised by freezing the surrounding ground to a minimum of 2.5 m (8.2 ft) outside the excavation zone prior to boring work, which was followed up within the space of a week by the application of a 120 cm (3.9 ft) thick lining of reinforced concrete; these measures resulted in slow progress however.

As a result of the heavy snowfall typically present in the Swiss Alps during the winter months, which caused unavoidable accessibility disruptions to the tunnel site, all construction work was suspended between mid-December and the end of February. Outside of this seasonal shutdown, the site was worked 24 hours per day each day via shift working. According to Rail Engineer, an average distance of 6.5 m (21 ft) would be driven during a single day. However, due to geological complications present at one part of the bore, the rate of progress was decreased to only around 0.7 m (2.3 ft) per day. Boring shall involve a total of roughly 244,000 m^{3} (8,600,000 ft^{3}) of rock being excavated.

The construction phase has been forecast to last 8.5 years; by August 2018, the tunnel's completion was expected sometime in 2022. On 2 October 2018, breakthrough between the two ends of the new bore occurred, a key milestone in the construction programme. In addition to the new tunnel itself, both Spinas and Preda stations on either side of the tunnel shall be modified. Once completed, around 15,000 trains are predicted to traverse the tunnel each year; it has been built to allow for a maximum speed of 120 km/h (75 mph).

On June 12, 2024, the new tunnel was opened to traffic. The opening ceremony was held on Jun 8, with 300 guests attending.

== Sources and references ==
=== References ===
- Gian Brüngger, Tibert Keller, Renato Mengotti: Abenteuer Albulabahn. Chur 2003, ISBN 3-85637-279-2
- Gion Caprez und Peter Pfeiffer: Albulabahn. Harmonie von Landschaft und Technik. Zürich 2003, ISBN 3-905111-89-6
- Hubertus von Salis Soglio: Bahnhistorischer Lehrpfad Preda-Bergün. Herausgegeben vom Verkehrsverein Bergün. Thusis ^{5}1997 (sold at RhB outlets or at the Bergün station).
- Henning Wall: Albula–Schlagader Graubündens. Aachen 1984, ISBN 3-921679-33-8
- Eisenbahn Journal Sonderausgabe Rhätische Bahn (I). Hermann Merker Verlag, Fürstenfeldbruck 1.1988, S. 34–102. ISSN 0720-051X
- Friedrich Hennings: Projekt und Bau der Albulabahn. Chur 1908.
- Hennings: Die neuen Linien der Rhätischen Bahn. In: Schweizerische Bauzeitung. Bd. 37/38, 1901, ISSN 0036-7524, S. 5–7 (PDF; 2,3 MB).
