= Lej da Gravatscha =

Lake in Graubünden, Switzerland

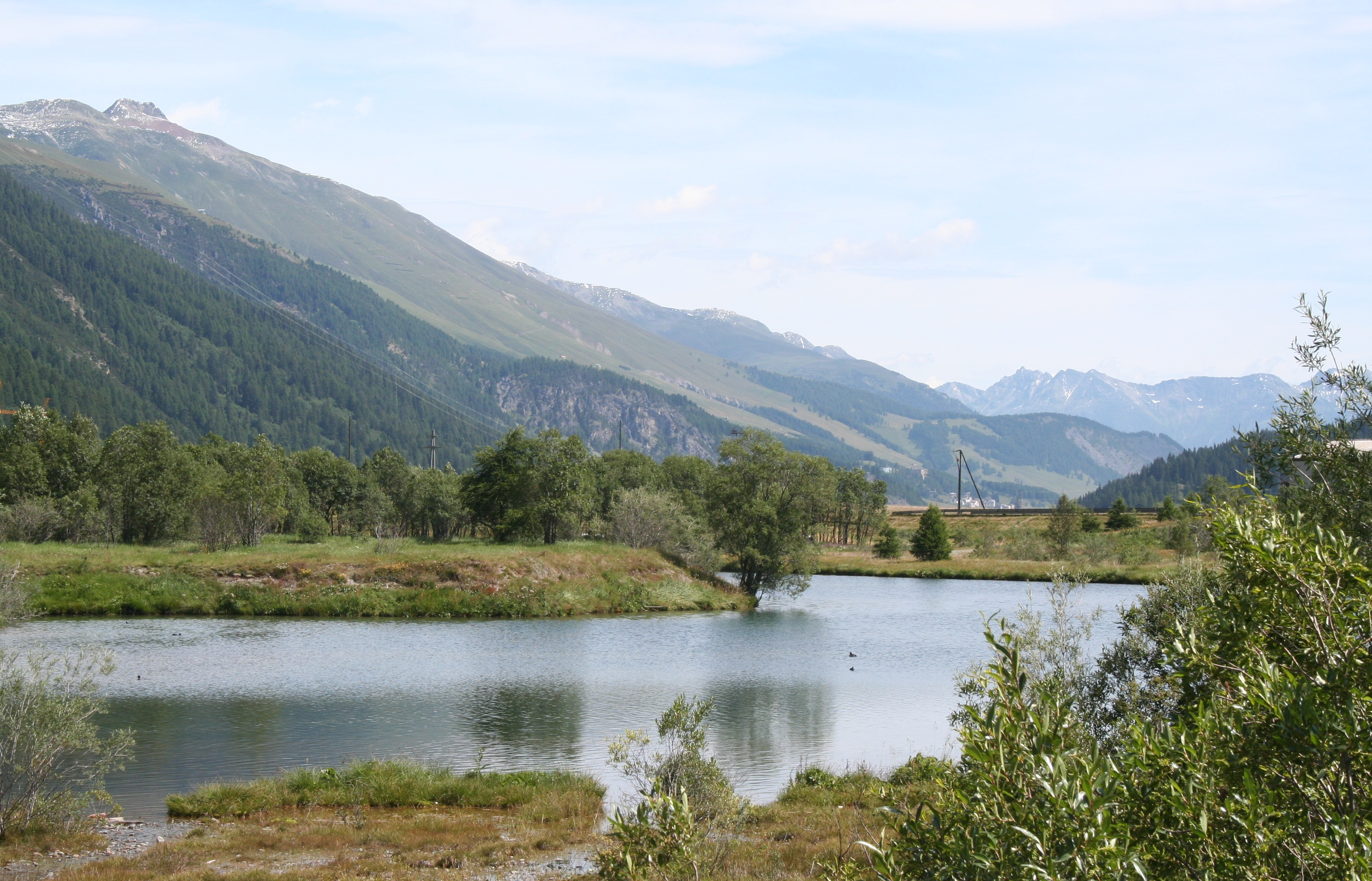

- Location within Canton of Graubünden Location within Switzerland Location within Alps
- Interactive map of Lej da Gravatscha
- Location: Engadin, Grisons
- Coordinates: 46°32′46″N 9°54′01″E
- Primary inflows: Ova Müsella, Ova da Val Champagna
- Basin countries: Switzerland
- Surface elevation: 1,698 m (5,571 ft)

Lej da Gravatscha is an artificial lake next to the Inn River near Bever in the Upper Engadin, Grisons, Switzerland.
