= Spinas railway station =

Railway station in Switzerland

Spinas
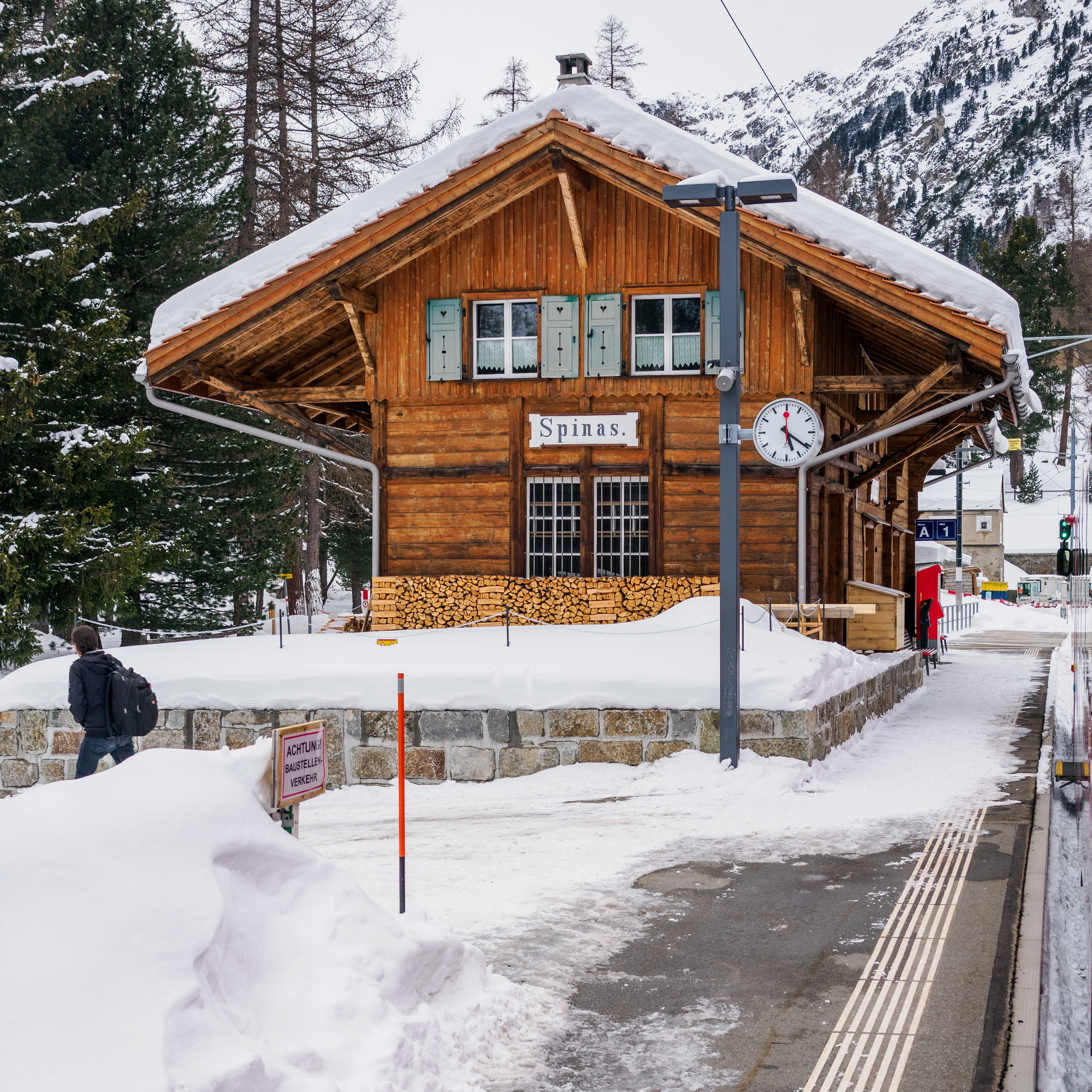
- The station in 2026

General information
- Location: Culögnas; Bever; Switzerland
- Coordinates: 46°33′35″N 9°50′43″E
- Elevation: 1,814 m (5,951 ft)
- Owner: Rhaetian Railway
- Line: Albula line
- Distance: 91.8 km (57.0 mi) from Landquart
- Platforms: 2
- Train operators: Rhaetian Railway

Other information
- Fare zone: 41 (Engadin Mobil)

History
- Opened: 1 July 1903
- Electrified: 20 April 1919

Passengers
- 2018: 50 per weekday

Services
Preceding station	Rhaetian Railway	Following station
Samedan towards St. Moritz	IR 38	Preda towards Chur
Location

Spinas railway station is a railway station at the south portal of the Albula Tunnel in the municipality of Bever, in the Swiss canton of Graubünden. It is located on the 1,000 mm (3 ft 3 3/8 in) metre gauge Albula line of the Rhaetian Railway. Services operate every two hours to this station.

== Services ==
As of the December 2023 timetable change, the following services stop at Spinas:

- InterRegio: service every two hours between Chur and St. Moritz.
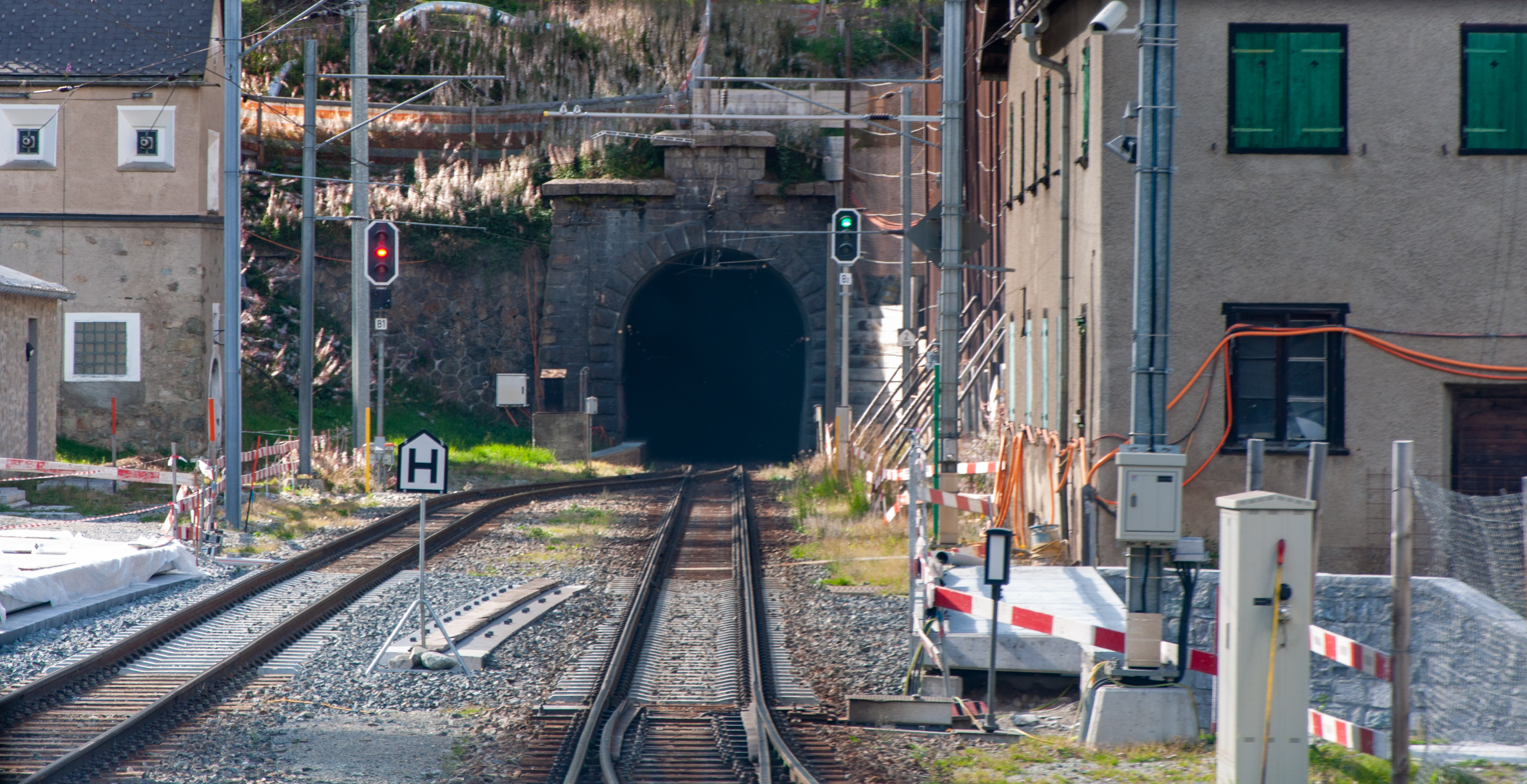
Albula Tunnel south portal (2018)

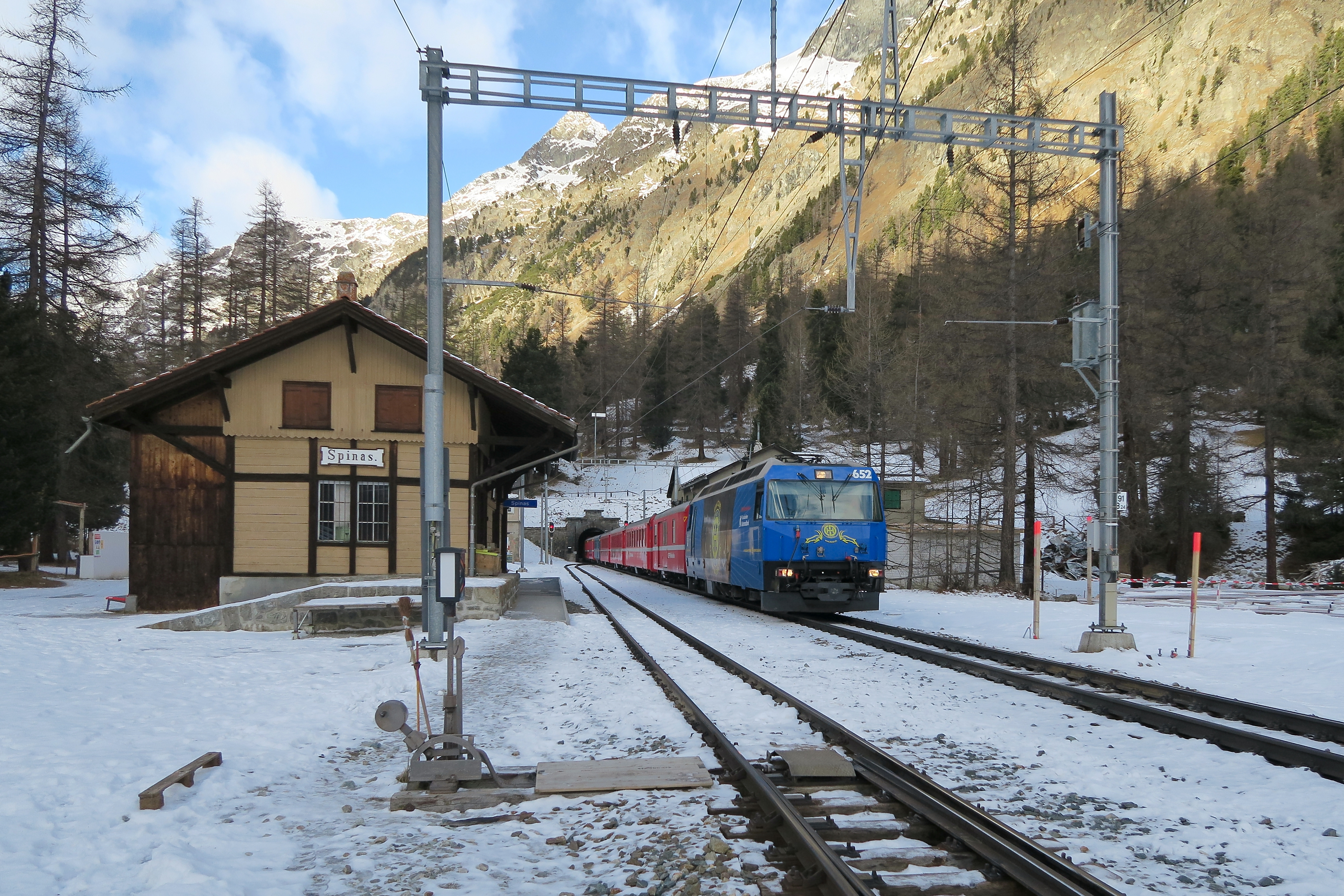
station building, winter view (2014)

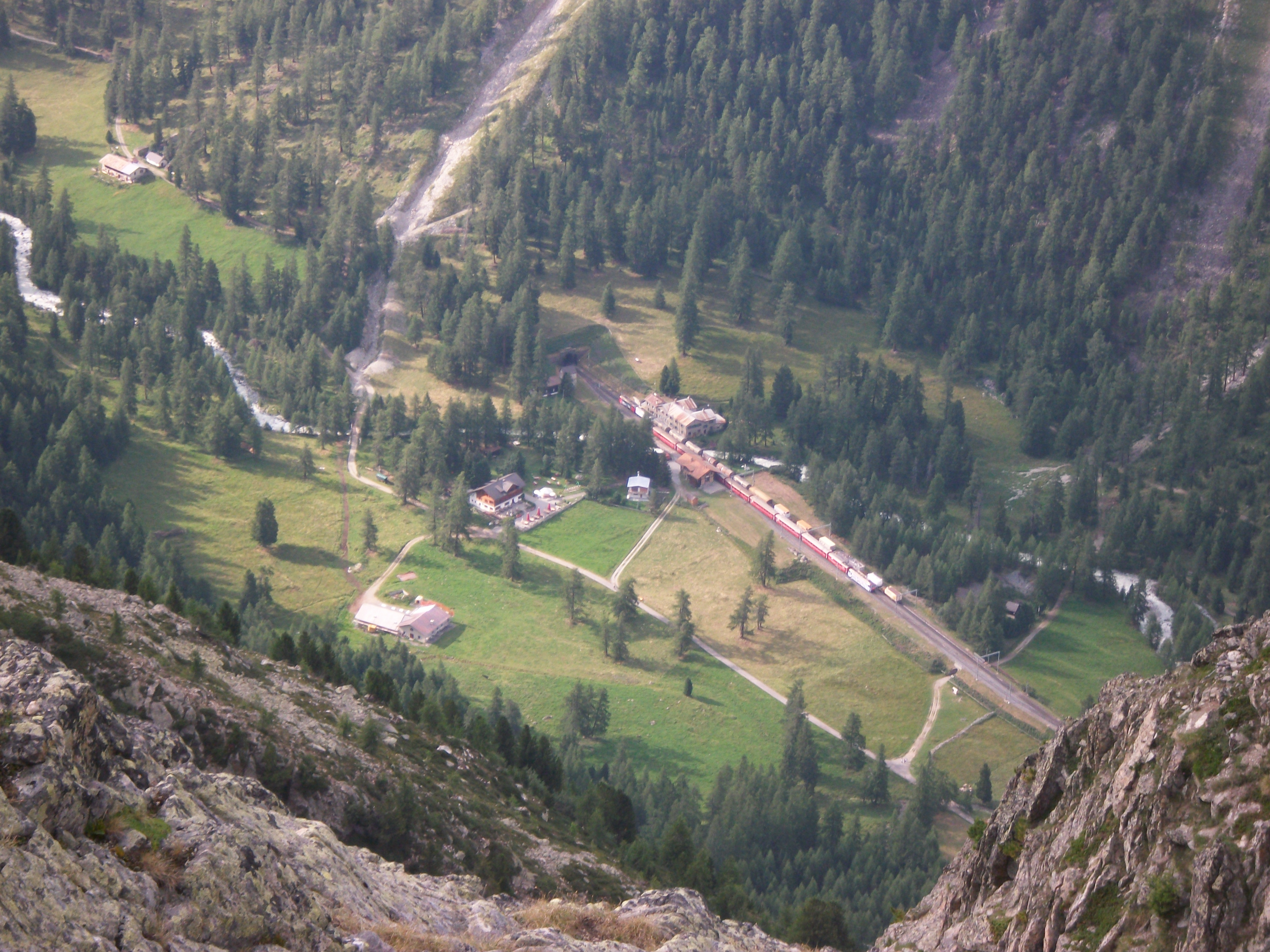
station from above (2013)

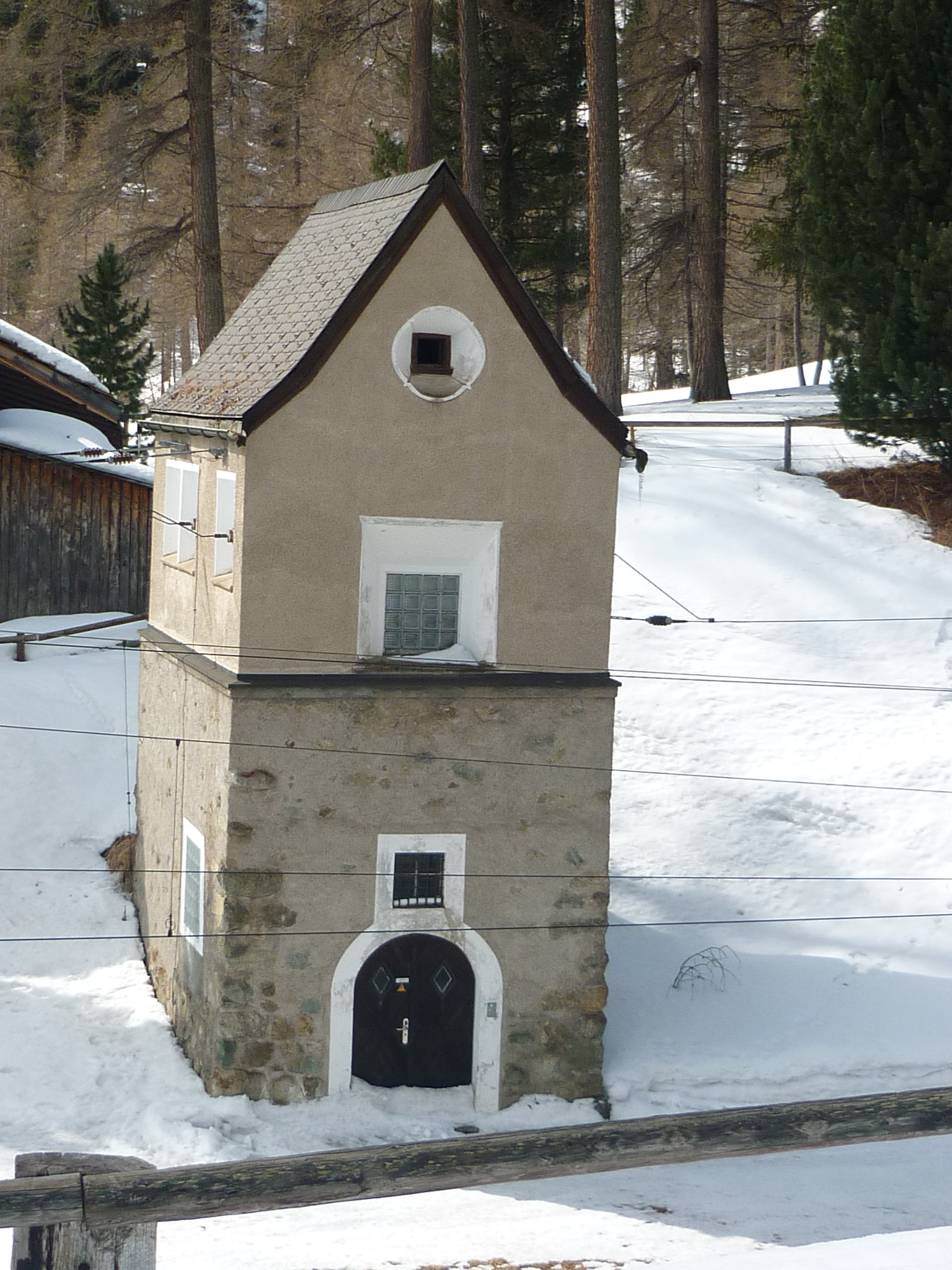
trafo tower structure (2013)

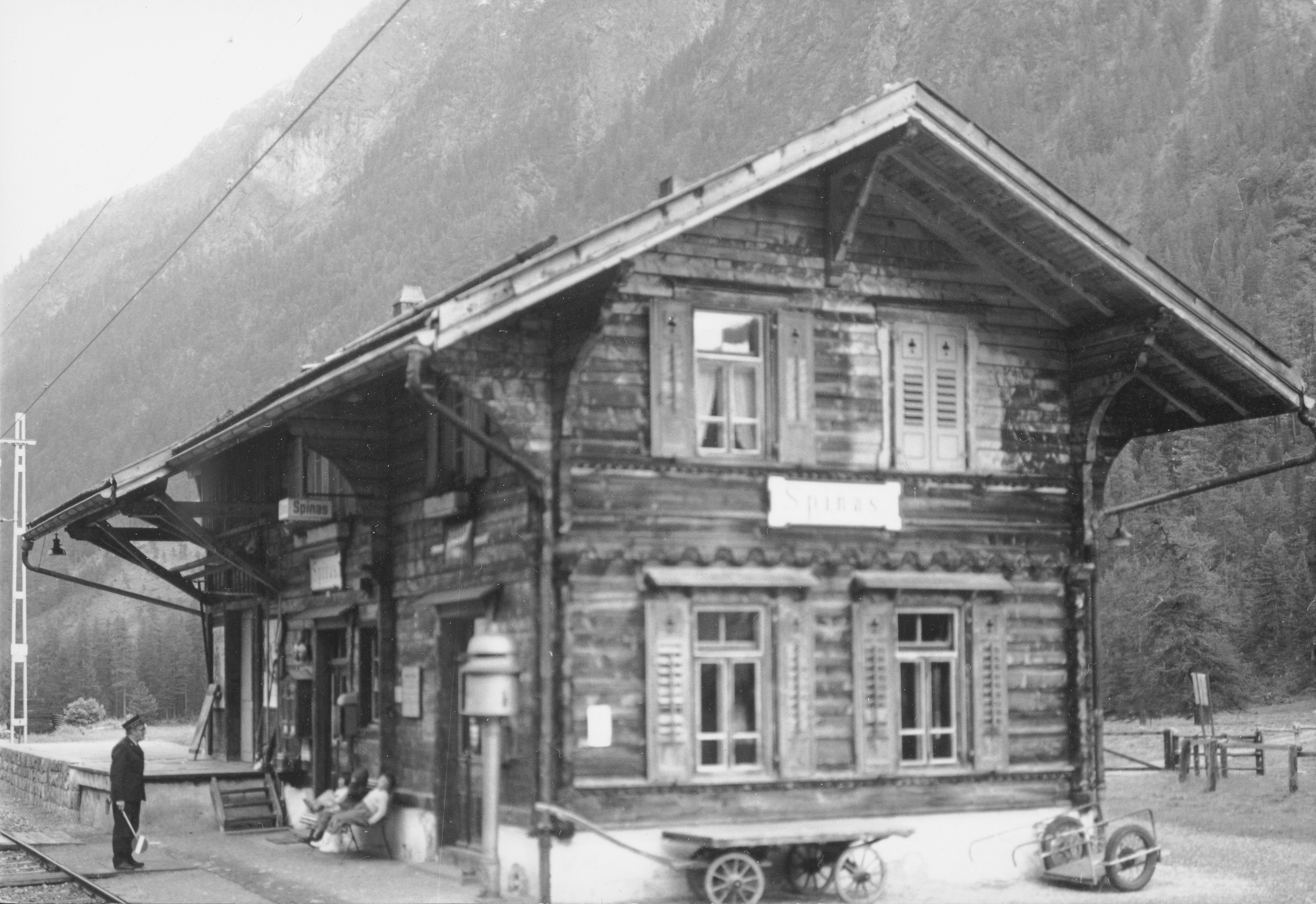
station building (1965)
