= Bever, Switzerland =

Bever
- Municipality
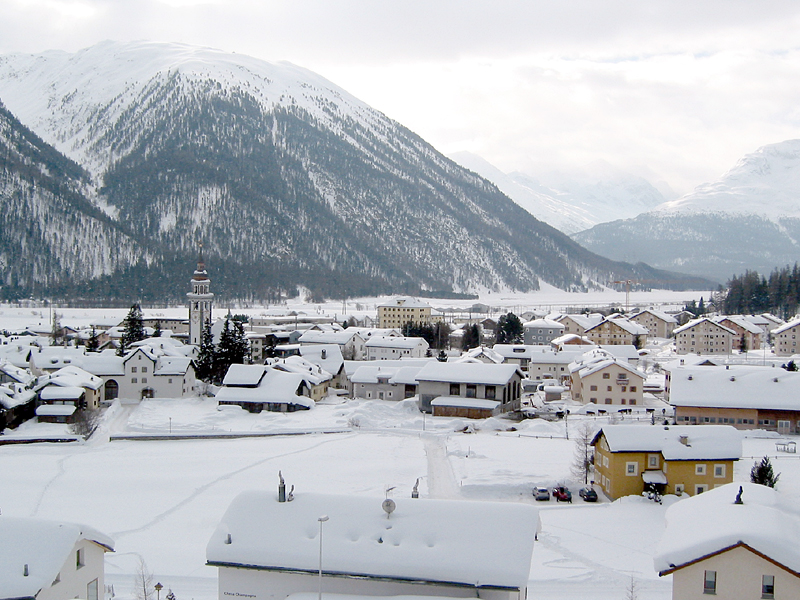

- Flag Coat of arms
- Location of Bever
- Location within Switzerland Location within Canton of Grisons
- Coordinates: 46°33′N 9°53′E
- Country: Switzerland
- Canton: Grisons
- District: Maloja

Area
  - Total: 45.65 km^{2} (17.63 sq mi)
- Elevation: 1,708 m (5,604 ft)

Population (December 2015)
  - Total: 627
  - Density: 13.7/km^{2} (35.6/sq mi)
- Time zone: UTC+01:00 (CET)
  - Summer (DST): UTC+02:00 (CEST)
- Postal code: 7502
- SFOS number: 3781
- ISO 3166 code: CH-GR
- Surrounded by: Bergün/Bravuogn, Bivio, La Punt Chamues-ch, Marmorera, Samedan, Sankt-Moritz, Silvaplana, Sur, Tinizong-Rona
- Website: www.bever.ch

Bever (Romansh: [ˈbevəɾ]; German and official until 1943 Bevers) is a municipality in the Maloja Region in the Swiss canton of the Grisons.

== History ==
Bever is first mentioned in 1139 as ad Bevero.

== Geography ==
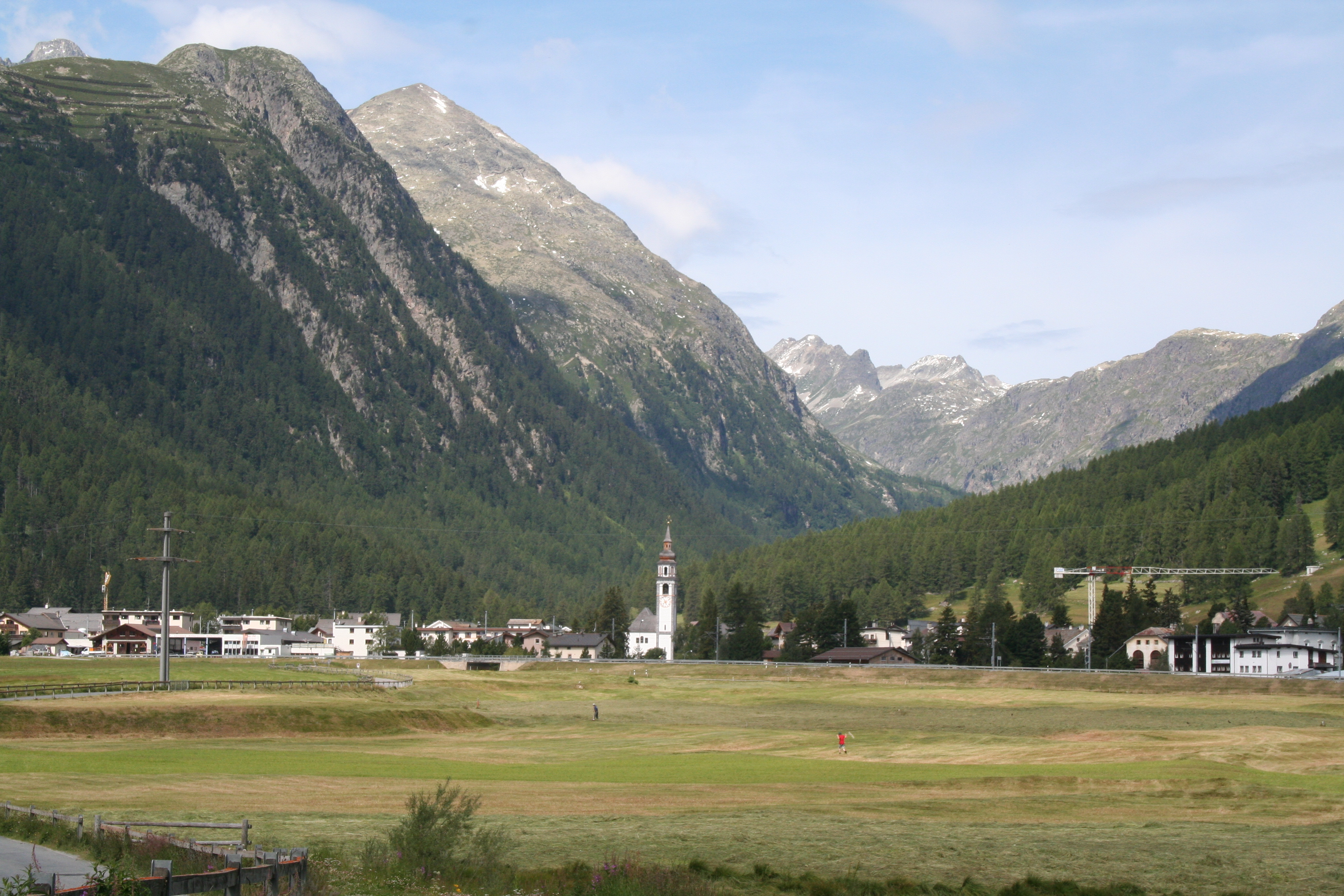
View of Bever

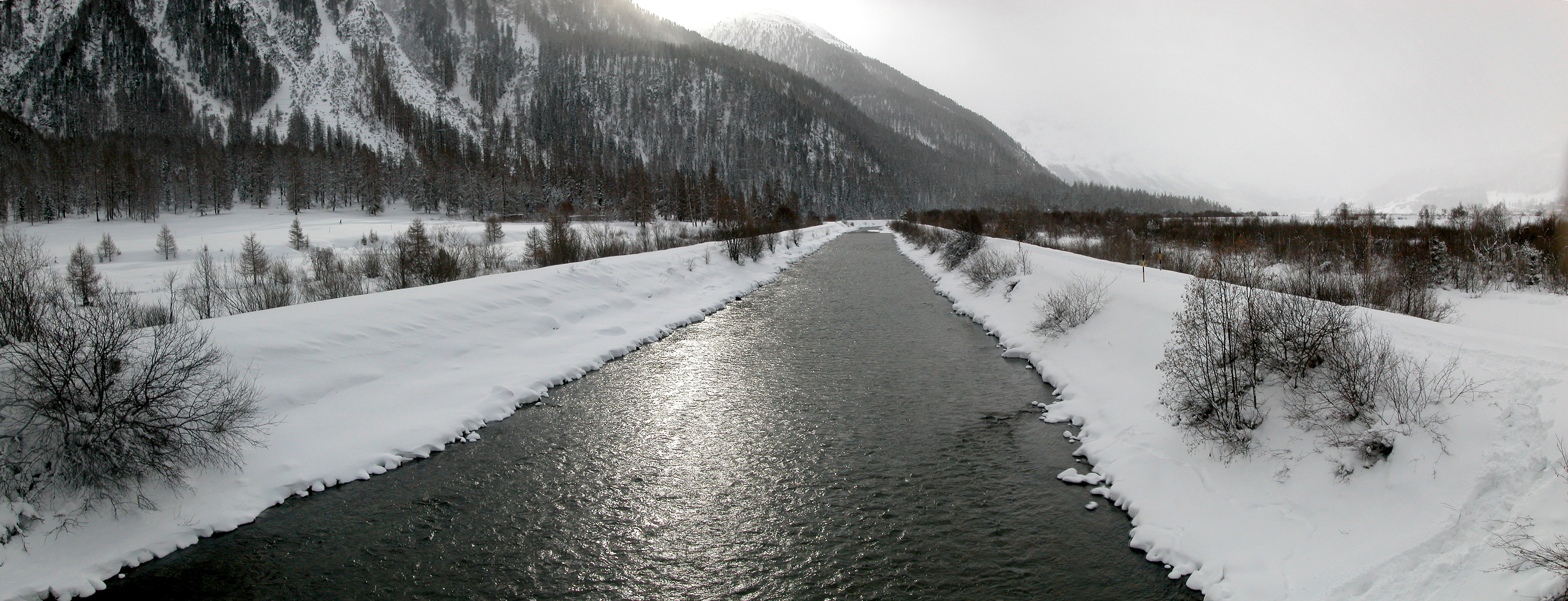
Inn at Bever

Aerial view from 2100 m by Walter Mittelholzer (1919)

Bever has an area, (as of the 2004/09 survey) of 45.75 km^{2} (17.66 sq mi). Of this area, about 15.3% is used for agricultural purposes, while 15.1% is forested. Of the rest of the land, 1.2% is settled (buildings or roads) and 68.4% is unproductive land. Over the past two decades (1979/85-2004/09) the amount of land that is settled has increased by 9 ha (22 acres) and the agricultural land has decreased by 41 ha (100 acres).

Until 2017 the municipality was located in the Oberengadin sub-district of the Maloja district, after 2017 it was part of the Maloja Region. It is located on the Inn River, and the artificial lake Lej da Gravatscha is nearby. It consists of the village of Bever and the hamlet of Spinas at the entrance to the Albula Tunnel. Until 1943 Bever was known as Bevers.

== Demographics ==
Bever has a population (as of December 2020) of 584. As of 2013, 17.4% of the population are resident foreign nationals. Over the last 3 years (2010-2013) the population has changed at a rate of -4.09%. The birth rate in the municipality, in 2013, was 3.2 while the death rate was 7.9 per thousand residents.

As of 2000, the gender distribution of the population was 51.5% male and 48.5% female.

As of 2013, children and teenagers (0–19 years old) make up 14.8% of the population, while adults (20–64 years old) are 68.6% and seniors (over 64 years old) make up 16.6%.

In 2013 there were 289 private households in Bever with an average household size of 2.17 persons. Of the 183 inhabited buildings in the municipality, in 2000, about 39.9% were single family homes and 37.2% were multiple family buildings. Additionally, about 32.8% of the buildings were built before 1919, while 19.1% were built between 1991 and 2000. In 2012 there was no new housing construction in the municipality. The vacancy rate for the municipality, in 2014, was 0.32%.

== Historic population ==
The historical population is given in the following chart:

== Politics ==
In the 2015 federal election the most popular party was the SVP with 28.4% of the vote. The next three most popular parties were the SP (26.0%), the FDP (15.5%) and the BDP (14.4%). In the federal election, a total of 242 votes were cast, and the voter turnout was 51.9%. The 2015 election saw a large change in the voting when compared to 2011. The percentage of the vote received by the SVP increased sharply from 22.5% in 2011 to 28.4% in 2015

In the 2007 federal election the most popular party was the SP which received 34.8% of the vote. The next three most popular parties were the SVP (30.9%), the FDP (20%) and the local, small right-wing parties (7.5%).

== Education ==
In Bever about 80.5% of the population (between age 25-64) have completed either non-mandatory upper secondary education or additional higher education (either university or a Fachhochschule).

== Economy ==
As of 2012, there were a total of 335 people employed in the municipality. Of these, a total of 22 people worked in 7 businesses in the primary economic sector. The secondary sector employed 144 workers in 8 separate businesses. Finally, the tertiary sector provided 169 jobs in 50 businesses. In 2013 0.0% of the population received social assistance.

== Languages ==
Most of the population (as of 2000) speaks German (66.6%), with Romansh being second most common (18.9%) and Italian being third (11.7%). Until the mid 19th Century, the entire population spoke the Upper-Engadin Romansh dialect of Puter. Due to increasing trade with the outside world, Romansh usage began to decline. In 1880 about 81% spoke Romansh as a first language, while in 1910 it was only 59%. The last time that Romansh was the majority language in Bever was in 1941. Following World War II German became the clear majority language. However, in the 1990s many German speakers moved away from the village causing the percentage of Romansh speakers to increase. In 1990 there were 47% who understood Romansh in Bever and in 2000 it was 45%.

Languages of Bever
Languages	Census 1970		Census 1980		Census 1990		Census 2000	
Languages	Number	Percent	Number	Percent	Number	Percent	Number	Percent
German	135	36.8%	175	40.5%	292	58.9%	420	66.6%
Romansh	123	33.5%	156	36.1%	120	24.2%	119	18.9%
Italian	104	28.3%	87	20.1%	73	14.7%	74	11.7%
TOTAL	367	100%	432	100%	496	100%	631	100%

== Transportation ==
The municipality has two railway stations, Bever and Spinas. Both are on lines of the Rhaetian Railway and between them have regular service to St. Moritz, Scuol-Tarasp, Chur, Landquart, and Pontresina.
