= Preda railway station =

Railway station in Switzerland

Preda
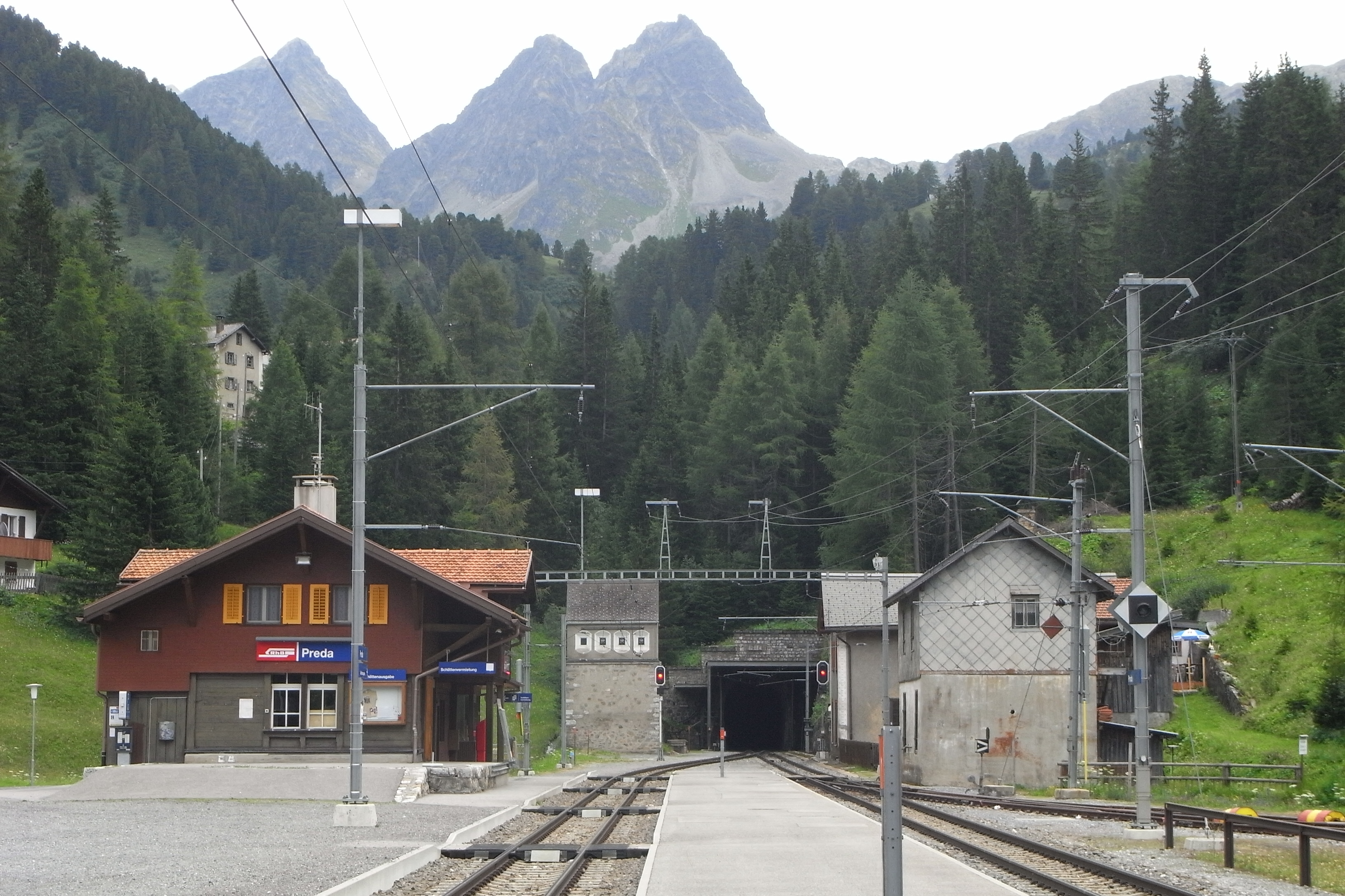
- Looking south at the station in 2008

General information
- Location: Stulzerstrasse; Bergün Filisur; Switzerland
- Coordinates: 46°35′17″N 9°46′38″E
- Elevation: 1,788 m (5,866 ft)
- Owner: Rhaetian Railway
- Line: Albula line
- Distance: 85.7 km (53.3 mi) from Landquart
- Platforms: 2
- Train operators: Rhaetian Railway
- Connections: PostAuto Schweiz buses

History
- Opened: 1 July 1903
- Electrified: 20 April 1919

Passengers
- 2018: 420 per weekday

Services
| Preceding station | Rhaetian Railway | Following station |
|---|---|---|
| Spinas towards St. Moritz | IR 38 | Bergün/Bravuogn towards Chur |
Location

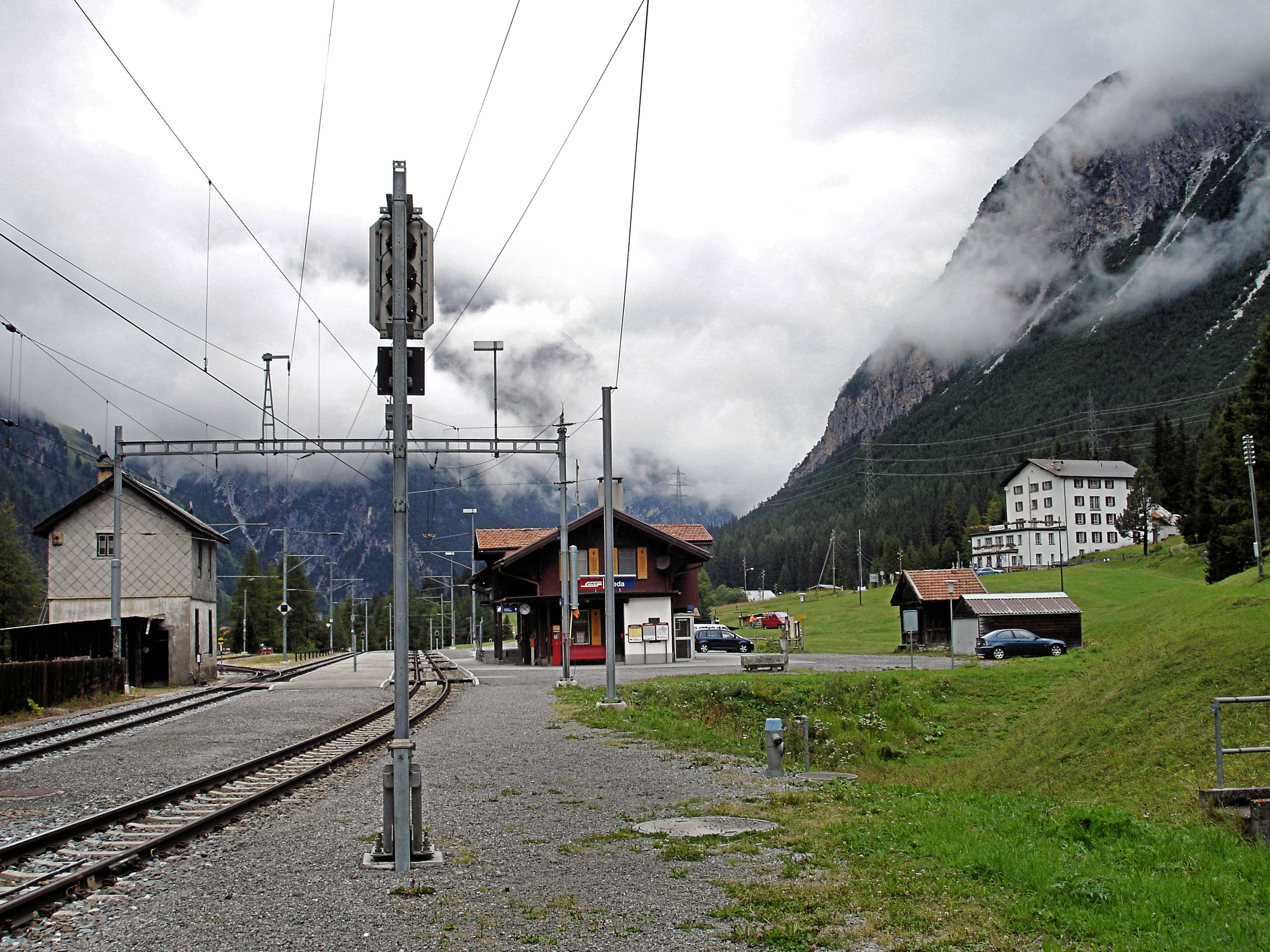
Preda station looking north

Preda railway station is a railway station in the municipality of Bergün Filisur, in the Swiss canton of Graubünden. It is located on the 1,000 mm (3 ft 3 3/8 in) metre gauge Albula line of the Rhaetian Railway. Hourly services operate on this section of the line.

== Services ==
As of the December 2023 timetable change, the following services stop at Preda:

- InterRegio: hourly service between Chur and St. Moritz.
