= Stadler Allegra =

Family of swiss electric multiple units

Allegra is a family of multiple unit trains developed by Stadler Rail for the Rhaetian Railway. It comprises the following train classes:

- Rhaetian Railway ABe 8/12, the dual voltage three car train delivered from 2009 for use on the Rhaetian Railway core network and on the Bernina Railway (15 trains ordered)
- Rhaetian Railway ABe 4/16, the single voltage four car train scheduled for delivery from the end of 2010, for use on the core network (5 trains ordered).
