= Achilles Schucan =

Swiss engineer (1844–1927)

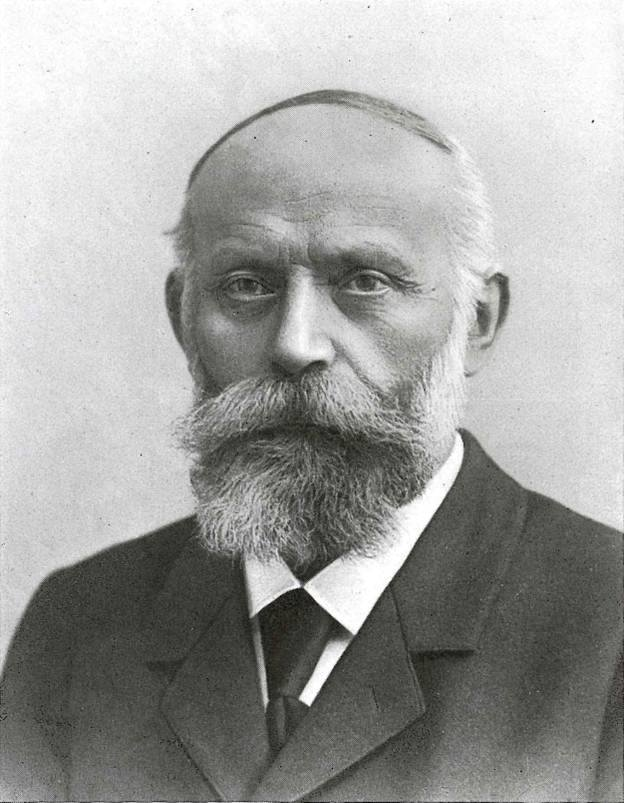
- Achilles Schucan (ca. 1910)
- Born: 19 January 1844; Avignon, France
- Died: 18 July 1927 (aged 83); Zürich, Switzerland
- Occupations: Railway engineer, railway director
- Known for: Directing the Rhaetian Railway

Achilles Schucan (19 January 1844 – 18 July 1927) was a Swiss engineer and rail industry executive. He was the first director of the Rhaetian Railway, which expanded from a single line to a substantial rail network under his direction.

== Early life and education ==
Achilles Schucan was born on 19 January 1844, in Avignon. His father was Luzi Schucan, a confectioner from the Engadin valley in the Swiss canton of Grisons. After attending school in Zuoz, Ftan, and Winterthur, he graduated from the cantonal school in Zürich, earning his Matura. He then enrolled at the ETH Zurich and graduated with an engineering degree in 1864.

== Career ==
Schucan started his professional career in Pirmasens, Germany, as an assistant to a construction site manager. In 1869, he worked as a construction supervisor on a section of the Nuremberg–Regensburg railway. After the opening of the railway, he returned to Switzerland in 1872, where he worked as section engineer for the Jura Railway and later for the Bernese Oberland Railway. He then took a position as assistant to the Federal Railroad Inspector in 1879. From 1885 to 1888, he served as director of the Seetal railway line.

He returned to his home canton of Grisons on 1 February 1888 to work for Willem Jan Holsboer, who planned to build a narrow-gauge railway from Landquart to Davos. Schucan took up the position of chief engineer and director of operations of the newly established Landquart-Davos AG. The railway was inaugurated in 1890.

In 1895, the company changed its name to Rhaetian Railway to reflect plans for the large-scale expansion of its rail network, which started one year later. Schucan served the Rhaetian Railway as director until 1909, when he became chairman of the company, a position he held until his retirement in 1918. Under his direction, the Rhaetian Railway expanded from a single line to a rail network covering a substantial part of the canton of Grisons. He died on 18 July 1927 in Zürich.

== Honours ==
In 1913, the ETH Zurich awarded Schucan an honorary doctorate in recognition of his contributions to the Rhaetian Railway, on the occasion of his 25th work anniversary.

The Rhaetian Railway multiple unit No. 3104, an Allegra ABe 4/16 model that entered service in June 2012, is named after Achilles Schucan.
