= Rhaetian Railway ABe 4/4 (core network) =

Swiss metre-gauge railcar class

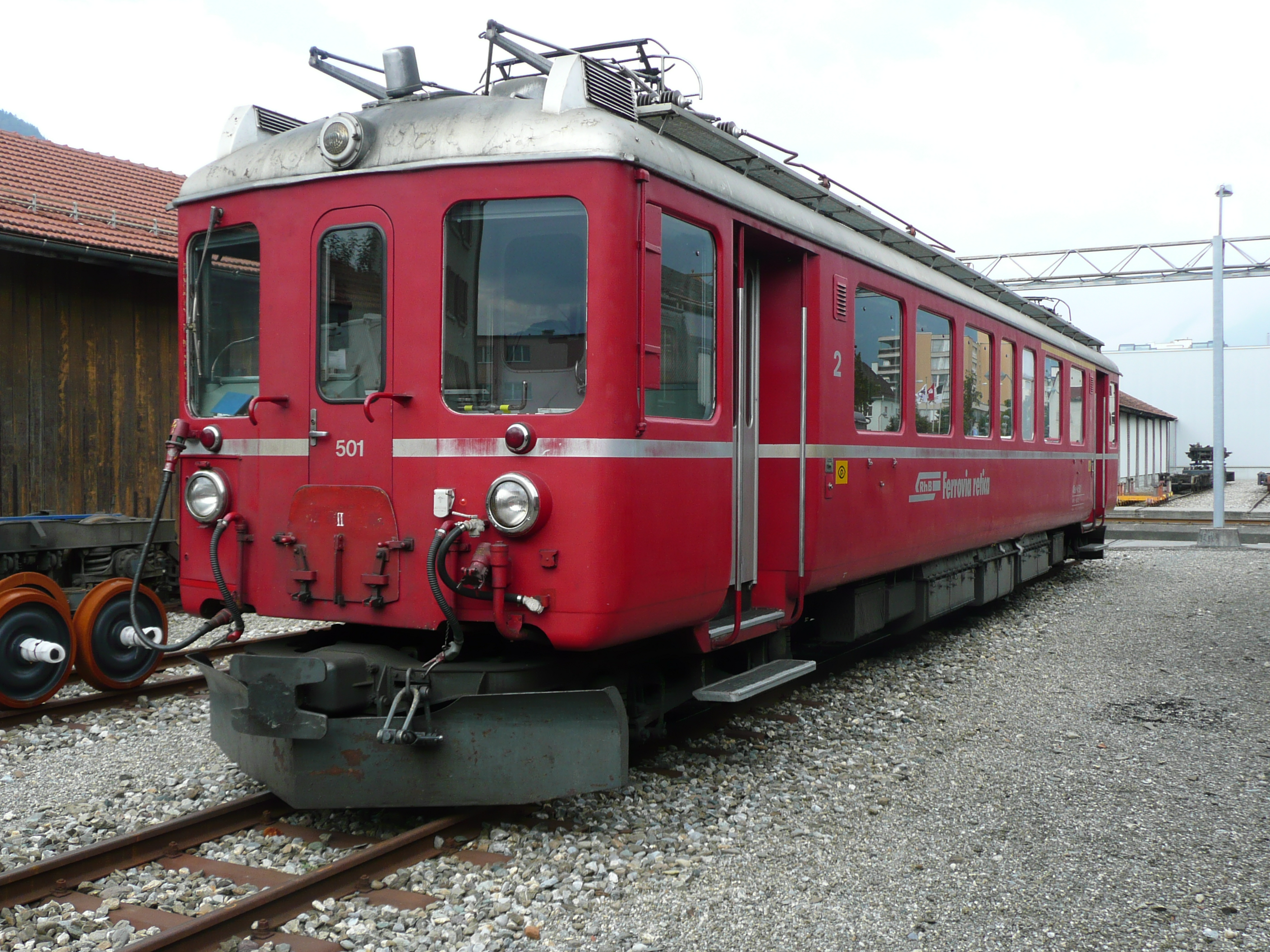
- ABe 4/4 no 501 at Landquart locomotive depot.
- In service: 1939–1990s
- Manufacturer: BBC, MFO, and SWS
- Constructed: 1939–1940
- Number built: 4
- Number preserved: 1
- Number scrapped: 3
- Fleet numbers: 501–504
- Capacity: 12 First, 28 second
- Operators: Rhaetian Railway

Specifications
- Car length: 18,000 mm (59 ft 1 in)
- Maximum speed: 70 km/h (43 mph)
- Weight: 39 tonnes (38 long tons; 43 short tons)
- Power output: 440 kW (590 hp)
- Electric system(s): 11 kV 16.7 Hz AC Overhead
- Current collection: Pantograph
- UIC classification: Bo′Bo′
- Track gauge: 1,000 mm (3 ft 3 3/8 in) metre gauge

The Rhaetian Railway ABe 4/4 was a class of 11 kV 16.7 Hz AC metre gauge railcars operating on the so-called core network of the Rhaetian Railway (RhB), which is the main railway network in the Canton of Graubünden, Switzerland.

The class was so named under the Swiss locomotive and railcar classification system. According to that system, ABe 4/4 denotes an electric railcar with first and second class compartments, and a total of four axles, all of which are drive axles.

The four members of the ABe 4/4 class, nos 501 to 504, entered service in 1939–1940, and were withdrawn from service at the end of the 1990s. One of them, no 501, has been preserved.

== Technical details ==
The ABe 4/4 class, known until 1956 as the BCe 4/4 class, comprised vehicles weighing 39 tonnes (38 long tons; 43 short tons) and having a top speed of 65 kilometres per hour (40 mph). These vehicles developed 440 kilowatts (590 hp) at 44 kilometres per hour (27 mph). Their mechanical components were manufactured by Schweizerische Wagons- und Aufzügefabrik AG Schlieren-Zürich (SWS), and their electrical equipment by Brown, Boveri & Cie and Maschinenfabrik Oerlikon (MFO).

== The ABe 4/4s in service ==
The four ABe 4/4 vehicles were procured in response to an increase in road transport in Graubünden.

The Rhaetian Railway, with its heavy mixed trains requiring shunting at many stations, and with its Ge 6/6 ^{I} class locomotives capable of only 55 kilometres per hour (34 mph), could not then match its road-borne competition. However, a new concept — simple, fast, frequent train services operated by the four new railcars — was seen as capable of winning back patronage on the most important railway lines to Davos and St Moritz. Together with the four powered vehicles, the Rhaetian Railway procured eight passenger cars, similarly in light steel construction, and promoted the new offering under the name Flying Rhaetian.

This attempt to deal with the competition failed, for two reasons. First, the short railcar powered trains could not cope with the increased demand. Secondly, there were so many technical failures, most of them due to the extremely lightweight construction, that the railcars were often out of service. From 1949, however, the Rhaetian Railway had greater success with the more solidly built Ge 4/4 ^{I} class locomotives.

After the Rhaetian Railway's main workshop at Landquart had succeeded in solving the technical problems afflicting the ABe 4/4s, the four railcars could be used reliably. From 1968, they could also be operated in pairs, using their newly installed multiple-unit train controls.

The last phase of the ABe 4/4s' working life began in 1982, as the Rhaetian Railway placed into service the three control cars, nos BDt 1721–1723. From then onwards, push-pull trains each made up of an ABe 4/4, an intermediate car if required, and a control car served the Oberengadin branch line Samedan – Pontresina, until the opening of the Vereina line in 1999, and the associated introduction of the NEVA Retica timetable concept made them superfluous.

ABe 4/4s nos 502 to 504 were withdrawn from service at the end of the 1990s and later scrapped. No 501 is still based at the Landquart locomotive depot as a heritage vehicle.

== Sources, further reading ==
=== Literature ===
- Claude Jeanmaire: Die elektrischen und Diesel-Triebfahrzeuge schweizerischer Eisenbahnen. 13. Teil: Rhätische Bahn: Stammnetz-Triebfahrzeuge. Archiv Nr. 219, (Verlag Eisenbahn), 1995, ISBN 3-85649-219-4
- Patrick Belloncle, Gian Brünger, Rolf Grossenbacher, Christian Müller "Das grosse Buch der Rhätischen Bahn 1889–2001" ISBN 3-9522494-0-8
- Wolfgang Finke, Hans Schweers "Die Fahrzeuge der Rhätischen Bahn 1889–1998 Band 3: Triebfahrzeuge" (SCHWEERS + WALL) ISBN 3-89494-105-7
- Hans-Bernhard Schönborn "Schweizer Triebfahrzeuge", 2004, (GeraMond) ISBN 3-7654-7176-3
