= Rhaetian Railway Ge 6/6 II =

Swiss electric locomotive

Rhaetian Railway Ge 6/6 ^{II}
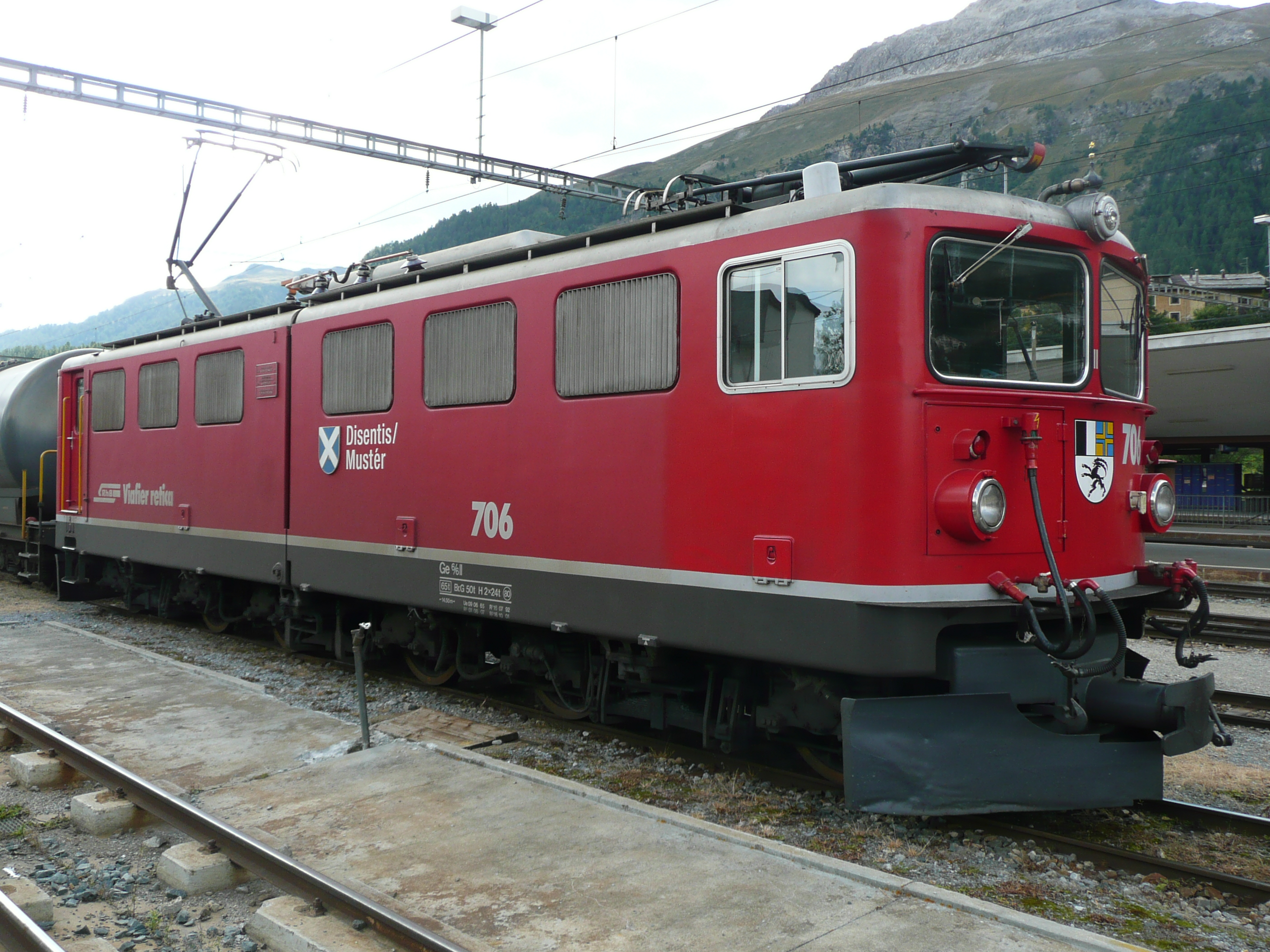
- Ge 6/6 II 706 "Disentis/Mustér" on 24 September 2008 at Filisur.
Type and origin
- Power type: Electric
- Builder: SLM, BBC and MFO
- Build date: 1958, 1965
- Total produced: 7
Specifications
- Configuration
  - UIC: Bo′Bo′Bo′
- Gauge: 1,000 mm (3 ft 3 3/8 in)
- Length: 14,500 mm (47 ft 7 in)
- Width: 2,650 mm (8 ft 8 in)
- Loco weight: 65 tonnes (64.0 long tons; 71.7 short tons)
- Electric system/s: 11 kV 16.7 Hz AC Overhead
- Current pickup: Pantograph
- Traction motors: 6 (Type 8SW570)
Performance figures
- Maximum speed: 80 km/h (50 mph)
- Power output: 1,764 kW (2,370 hp)
- Tractive effort: 213.9 kN (48,090 lbf)
Career
- Operators: Rhaetian Railway
- Numbers: 701–707
- Locale: Graubünden, Switzerland
- Current owner: Rhaetian Railway
- Disposition: Most have been withdrawn, and some have been scrapped. One will be saved for preservation in the future,

The Rhaetian Railway Ge 6/6 ^{II} is a class of heavy metre gauge electric locomotives operated by the Rhaetian Railway (RhB), which is the main railway network in the Canton of Graubünden, Switzerland.

The class is so named because it was the second class of locomotives of the Swiss locomotive and railcar classification type Ge 6/6 to be acquired by the Rhaetian Railway. According to that type designation, Ge 6/6 denotes a narrow gauge electric adhesion locomotive with a total of six axles, all of which are drive axles.

The twelve-wheel Ge 6/6 ^{II} machines (UIC classification Bo′Bo′Bo′) are currently used mainly to haul goods trains.

== History ==
=== Background ===
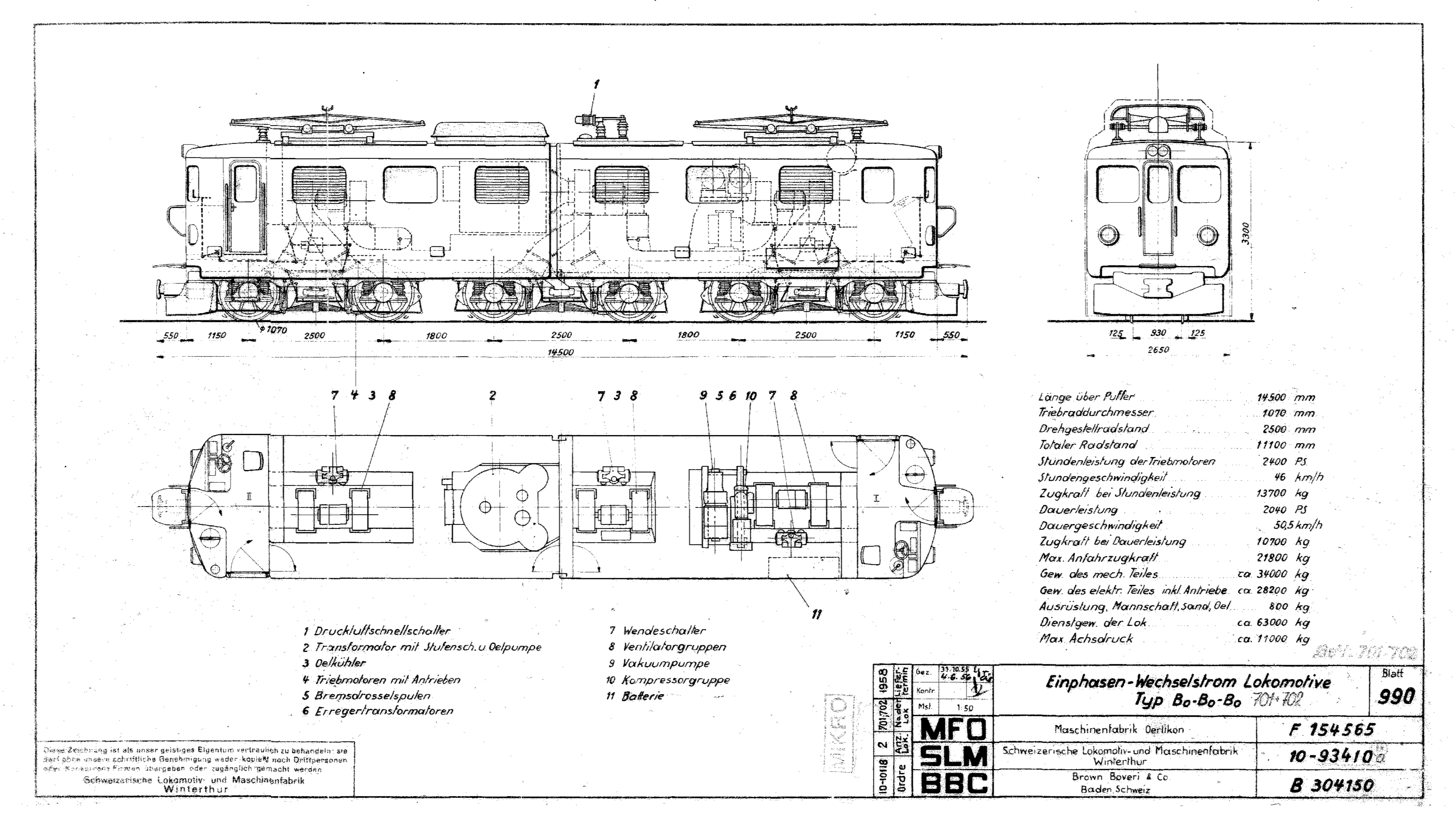
Technical drawing of the Ge 6/6 701 and 702

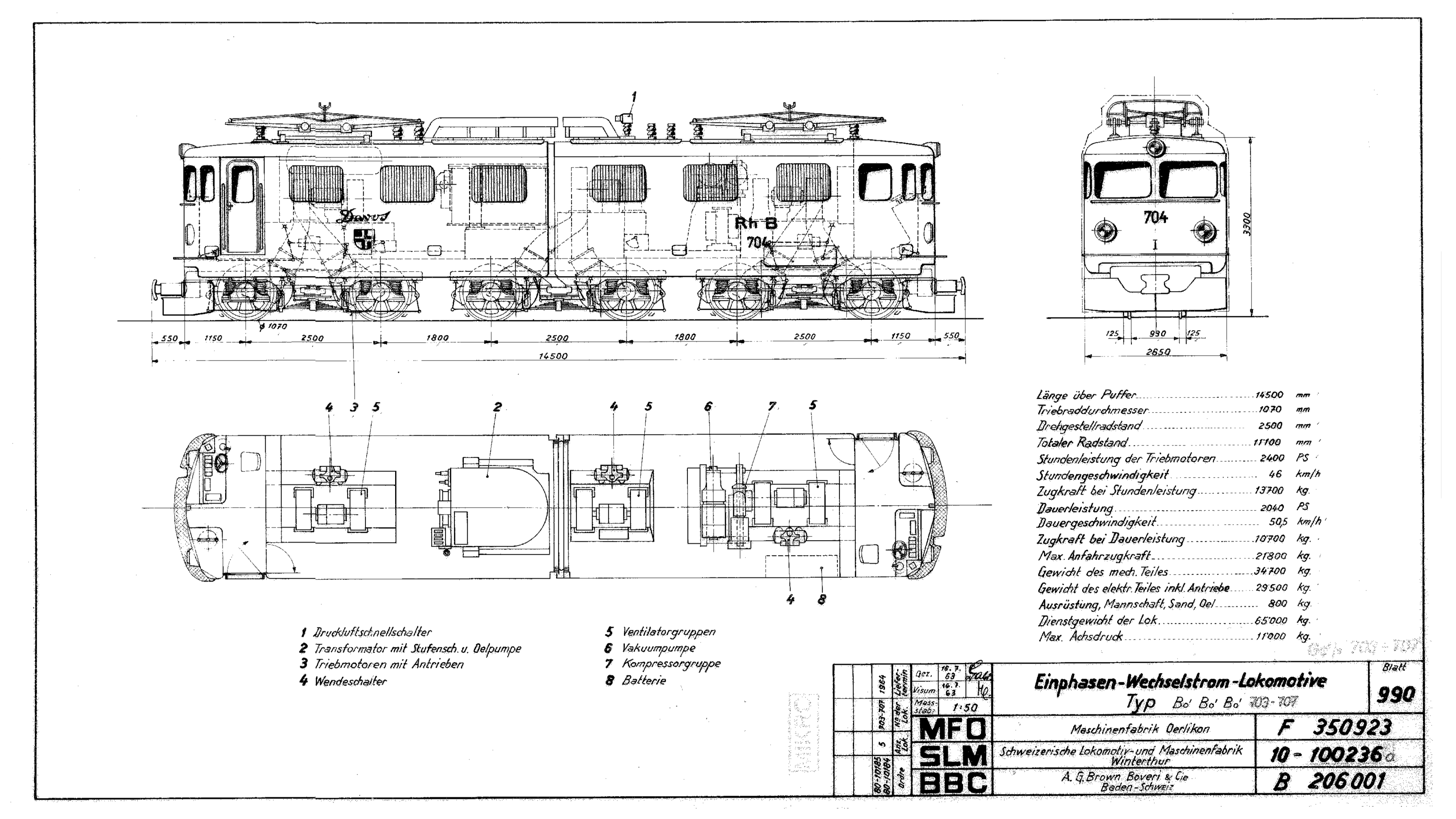
Technical drawing of the Ge 6/6 703 to 707

In the 1950s, traffic on the Rhaetian Railway grew so strongly that the existing Ge 6/6 Crocodiles and the Ge 4/4 ^{I} Bo-Bo locomotives were no longer sufficient. Construction of the Bergell power station, begun in 1958 by the Elektrizitätswerk der Stadt Zürich, required the transfer of up to 1,000 tonnes (980 long tons; 1,100 short tons) of cement per day from the Untervaz to the Engadin. For that task, the Rhaetian Railway required a locomotive that could haul a load of 250 tonnes (250 long tons; 280 short tons) on the 3.5% gradients of the Albula Railway.

=== Commissioning ===
The two locomotives of the first production run (numbers 701 and 702) were delivered by the manufacturers Schweizerische Lokomotiv- und Maschinenfabrik (SLM), Brown, Boveri & Cie (BBC) and Maschinenfabrik Oerlikon (MFO) at a price of 230,000 Swiss francs each. The remaining locomotives in the class (numbers 703 to 707, each placed in service in 1965) were each 200,000 francs more expensive.

== Construction ==
=== As delivered ===
Technically, the electrical components of the Ge 6/6 ^{II} class corresponded with the then state of the art: (low voltage) on-load tap-changer transformer, and single phase universal traction motors.

The two outermost bogies and the traction motors were exchangeable with the Ge 4/4 ^{I}. The box joint between the two halves of the locomotive permits only vertical movements.

The Ge 6/6 ^{II} locomotives have a top speed of 80 kilometres per hour (50 mph), weigh 65 tonnes (64 long tons; 72 short tons), and develop 1,776 kilowatts (2,382 hp) at 46 kilometres per hour (29 mph). The maximum towing load is 205 tonnes (202 long tons; 226 short tons) at a gradient of 4.5%, and 280 tonnes (280 long tons; 310 short tons) at a 3.5% gradient.

=== Modifications ===
The first two locomotives were fitted with communication doors on the cab fronts. These were welded up in 1968–69, but the complete assimilation of the first two locos with the second series (which have two instead of three cab end windows) occurred only towards the end of the 1980s. In 1985 the Rhaetian Railway began reliverying the class from green to red, and in 1998 the original diamond shaped pantographs were replaced with modern single arm pantographs.

== The Ge 6/6 ^{II} today ==
After completion of the Bergell power station, the 700s were used predominantly to haul fast passenger trains on the Albula Railway. Since these duties were taken over by the Ge 4/4 ^{III} class, which was placed in service in 1993, the Ge 6/6 ^{II} has been found mainly at the head of goods trains on the whole of the Rhaetian Railway's core network (apart from the Arosa line). However, the 700s can still be seen hauling some passenger trains.

Loco 701 carries the name of the Roman province of Raetia, which to this day has remained as a synonym for the Swiss province of Graubünden. Loco 702 bears the name Curia, which is the Latin name of the canton's capital city, Chur. The remaining locos, numbered 703–707, are named after major Graubünden municipalities, each situated at an end point of the core network. Adjacent to the name on every locomotive is the traffic number in white, along with the coat of arms of the applicable municipality (on loco 701, the Graubünden coat of arms).

As for the future of the Ge 6/6 II class one locomotive is to be retained by Rhb Historic for preservation Loco 704 Davos for forseable future. In July 2020, locomotive 701 was the first locomotive of this series to be taken out of service, followed by locomotive 705 at the beginning of January 2021. On February 10, 2021, locomotive 701 was the first locomotive in Chur to be scrapped. In mid-May 2021, locomotive 705 was put into service again because locomotive 704 suffered major damage. Locomotive 706 was putting out of service after an engine failure, locomotive 703 after a minor fire and engine failure. On November 1, 2021, all other locomotives (702, 705, 707) were taken out of service. Locomotive 704 was to be preserved as an operational museum vehicle, however due to its poor condition, the RhB ultimately decided to keep locomotive 707 instead ,which was transferred to Samedan on November 19, 2021. Locomotive 702 were transferred into the Verkehrshaus Luzern in March 2023, but it should be in the future return to the RhB and being restored in its original condition, while all the other ones except 705 and 707 scrapped.

== List of locomotives ==
The following locomotives in the class are in service on the Rhaetian Railway:

List of the Ge 6/6 ^{II} locomotives of the Rhaetian Railway
Road number	Name	Coat of arms	Commissioning	Status
701	Raetia		09.05.1958	scrapped in Chur on February 10, 2021
702	Curia		19.06.1958	exhibited in Verkehrshaus Luzern since March 2023, to be brought back to RhB and restored in original condition
703	St. Moritz		05.04.1965	scrapped in Chur on June 14. 2022
704	Davos		03.02.1965	scrapped in Chur on July 10, 2022
705	Pontresina/Puntraschigna		05.05.1965	out of service, stored at Landquart
706	Disentis/Mustér		09.06.1965	scrapped in Chur on December 14, 2023
707	Scuol^{1}		05.07.1965	out of service, stored at Samedan, preserved as future historic locomotive
^{1} until 1971 Schuls/Scuol

== See also ==
- History of rail transport in Switzerland
- Rail transport in Switzerland
