= Bernina-Bahngesellschaft Ge 4/4 82 =

Swiss electric heritage locomotive

Bernina-Bahngesellschaft Ge 4/4 82 Rhaetian Railway Ge 4/4 182
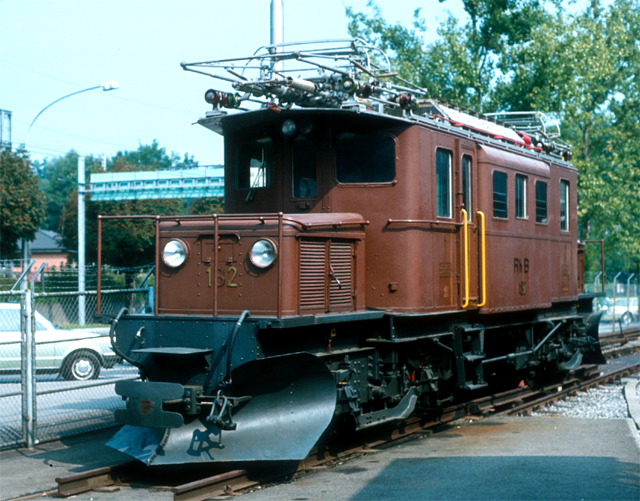
- Ge 4/4 182 at the Swiss Transport Museum, Lucerne during the Crocodile Exhibition in 1982.
Type and origin
- Power type: Electric
- Builder: SLM and BBC
- Build date: 1928
- Total produced: 1
Specifications
- Configuration
  - UIC: B′B′
- Gauge: 1,000 mm (3 ft 3 3/8 in)
- Electric system/s: 1000 V DC Overhead
- Current pickup: Pantograph
- Transmission: electrical / mechanical
Performance figures
- Maximum speed: 55 km/h (34 mph)
Career
- Operators: Bernina Railway → Rhaetian Railway
- Class: Ge 4/4
- Numbers: BB: 82; RhB: 182
- Nicknames: Bernina Crocodile
- Locale: Graubünden, Switzerland
- Retired: 1977
- Restored: 2001–
- Current owner: Club 1889
- Disposition: Undergoing restoration

The Bernina-Bahngesellschaft Ge 4/4 82, later known as the Rhaetian Railway Ge 4/4 182, is a 1,000 V DC metre gauge B′B′ electrically powered heritage locomotive made in Switzerland.

The Ge 4/4 is so named under the Swiss locomotive and railcar classification system. According to that system, Ge 4/4 denotes a narrow gauge electric locomotive with a total of four axles, all of which are drive axles.

Less formally, the locomotive is nicknamed the Bernina Crocodile, due to its external similarity to the Crocodile locomotives of Rhaetian Railway type Ge 6/6 ^{I}, and Swiss Federal Railways types Ce 6/8 ^{II} and Ce 6/8^{III}. However, the Ge 4/4 182 is not an articulated locomotive, and therefore the Crocodile nickname is not entirely accepted as appropriate for it.

== History ==
After entering service in 1928, the Ge 4/4 operated on the Bernina Railway, linking St Moritz in Switzerland with Tirano in Italy, via the Bernina Pass. Its fleet number in its Bernina Railway service was 82.

In 1943, the previously independent Bernina Railway was taken over by the Rhaetian Railway (RhB), which is the main railway network in the Canton of Graubünden, Switzerland. At the time of the takeover, the Ge 4/4, like all of the Bernina Railway's other motive power, was similarly acquired by the Rhaetian Railway. The locomotive continued to haul trains on the Bernina Railway. In 1962, the locomotive was renumbered 182, to help free up the numbers in the range 51-99 for use on rail tractors. It was withdrawn from service in 1977.

The locomotive was then transferred to the Swiss Transport Museum in Lucerne, where it remained until 1981. In 1984, it was taken over by the French metre gauge Chemin de Fer de La Mure. However, the Ge 4/4 never operated there, because it was discovered, only after the locomotive's release to that railway, that it could not be used at that railway's operating voltage of 2,400 V DC. In 1999, the locomotive was transferred again, this time to Associazione 182 of Club 1889 — a Graubünden railway club — which has since returned the now static and weathered machine back to Switzerland.

After a long restoration it was presented on 10 April 2010 to the public at Poschiavo newly restored back into working order. In 2018 the locomotive was transferred to the Blonay-Chamby museum railway, including also special trips on the neigbouring networks of MOB and GFM up to Saanen and Bulle.
