= Rhaetian Railway ABe 4/16 =

Class of Swiss multiple units

Rhaetian Railway ABe 4/16 STZ
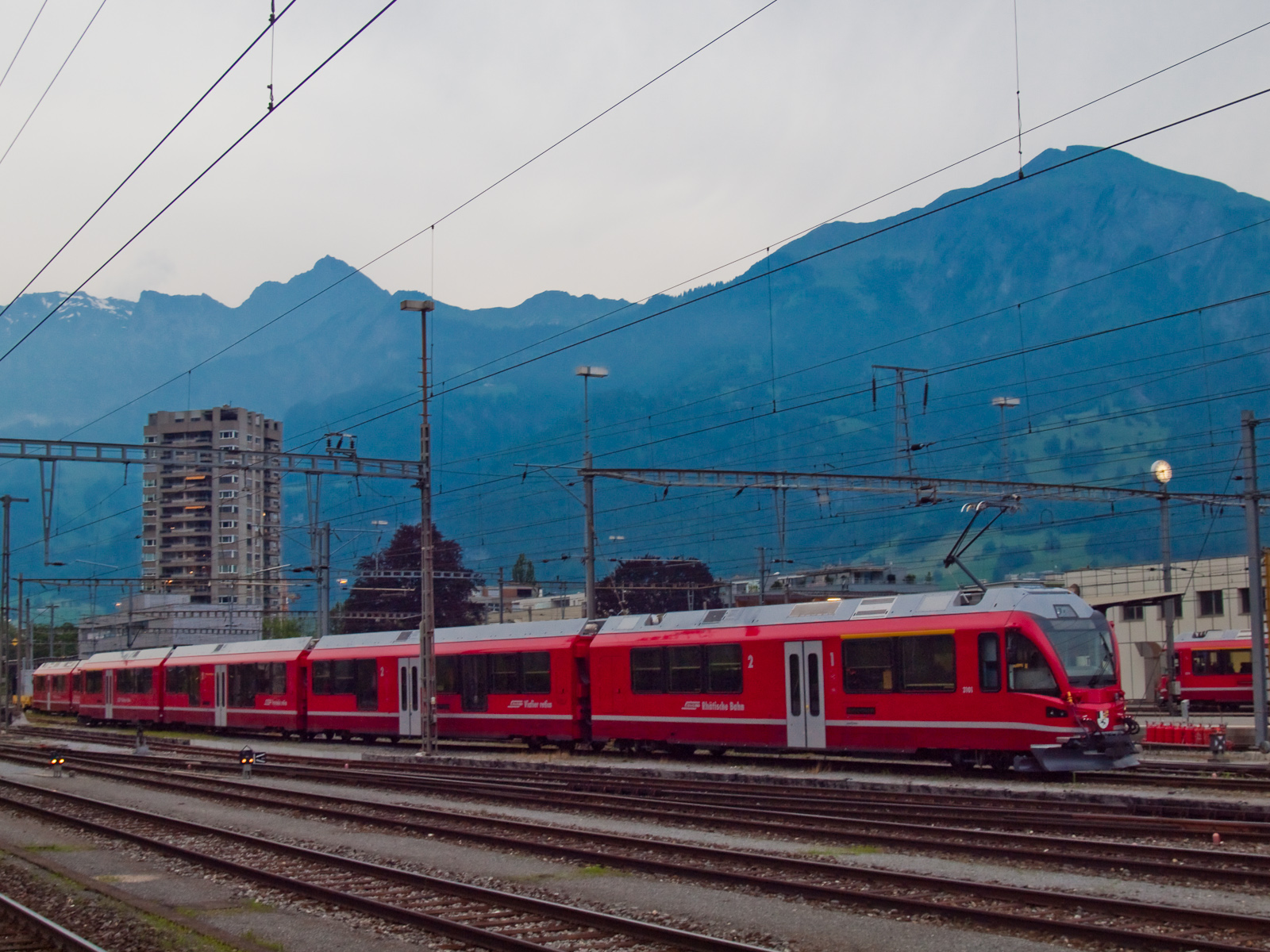
- The first member of the class seen during its test period at Landquart station.
- Manufacturer: Stadler Rail
- Constructed: 2011
- Number under construction: 5
- Operators: Rhaetian Railway

Specifications
- Train length: 74,900 mm (245 ft 8 7/8 in)
- Width: 2,650 mm (8 ft 8 3/8 in)
- Maximum speed: 100 km/h (62 mph)
- Weight: 105 tonnes (103 long tons; 116 short tons)
- Power output: 1,300 kW (1,740 hp)
- Tractive effort: 130 kN (29,230 lbf)130 kN (29,230 lbf)
- Electric system(s): 11 kV 16.7 Hz AC Overhead
- Current collection: Pantograph
- UIC classification: Bo′Bo′+2′2′+2′2′+2′2′
- Track gauge: 1,000 mm (3 ft 3 3/8 in) metre gauge

The Rhaetian Railway ABe 4/16 is a class of metre gauge four-car electric multiple unit trains of the Rhaetian Railway (RhB), which is the main railway network in the Canton of Graubünden, Switzerland.

The class is so named under the Swiss locomotive and railcar classification system. According to this system, ABe 4/16 denotes an electric railcar train with first and second class compartments, and a total of 16 axles, four of which are drive axles.

The ABe 4/16 trains for the Rhaetian Railway were scheduled to be delivered from late 2010. Entry into service was somewhat later. It was intended that the trains would be used mainly on commuter trains on the railway's core network, which is electrified at 11 kV 16.7 Hz AC.

Each train is almost 75 metres long and is equipped with comfortable air-conditioned compartments for 24 first class and 156 second class passengers. One of the end cars of each train has four powered axles; the twelve axles under the other three cars are unpowered.
