= Rhaetian Railway Ge 4/4 I =

Swiss electric locomotive

Rhaetian Railway Ge 4/4 ^{I}
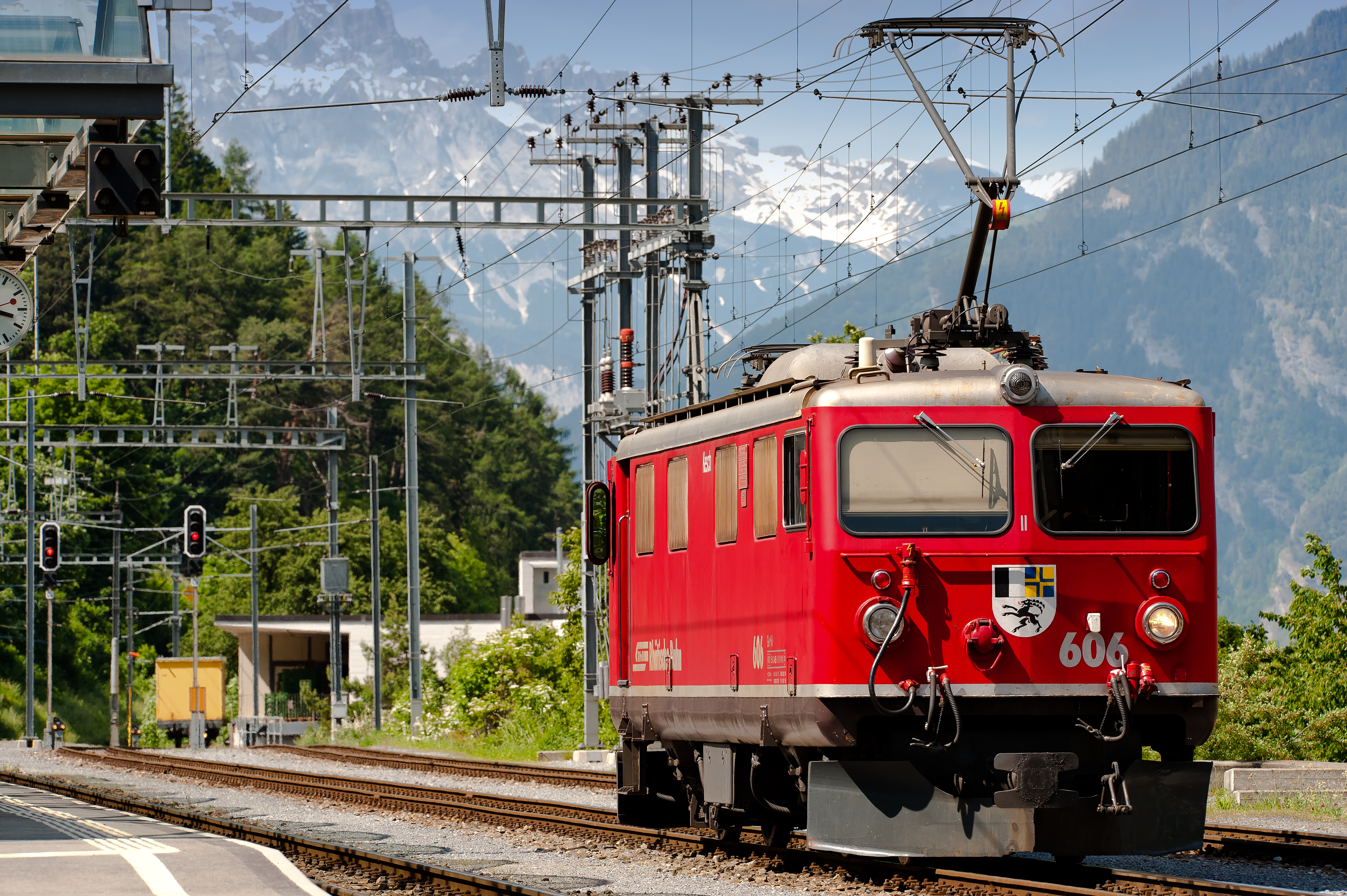
- Ge 4/4 ^{I} No. 606 Kesch at Thusis, 2009.
Type and origin
- Power type: Electric
- Builder: SLM, BBC and MFO
- Build date: 1947, 1953
- Total produced: 10
- Rebuild date: 1986–1991
Specifications
- Configuration
  - UIC: Bo′Bo′
- Gauge: 1,000 mm (3 ft 3 3/8 in)
- Length: 12,100 mm (39 ft 8 in)
- Width: 2,650 mm (8 ft 8 in)
- Loco weight: Originally: 47 tonnes (46.3 long tons; 51.8 short tons); Rebuilt: 48 tonnes (47.2 long tons; 52.9 short tons)
- Electric system/s: 11 kV 16.7 Hz AC Overhead
- Current pickup: Pantograph
- Traction motors: Four (type 8 SW 570)
Performance figures
- Maximum speed: Originally: 75 km/h (47 mph), Rebuilt: 80 km/h (50 mph)
- Power output: 1,180 kW (1,580 hp)
- Tractive effort: 142 kN (31,920 lbf)
Career
- Operators: Rhaetian Railway
- Numbers: 601–610
- Locale: Graubünden, Switzerland
- Current owner: Rhaetian Railway
- Disposition: Six scrapped, four in service. two will be preserved by Rhb in the future.

The Rhaetian Railway Ge 4/4 ^{I} is a class of metre gauge Bo′Bo′ electric locomotives operated by the Rhaetian Railway (RhB), which is the main railway network in the Canton of Graubünden, Switzerland.

The class is so named because it was the first class of locomotives of the Swiss locomotive and railcar classification type Ge 4/4 to be acquired by the Rhaetian Railway. According to that type designation, Ge 4/4 denotes a narrow gauge electric adhesion locomotive with a total of four axles, all of which are drive axles.

The 10 machines in the Ge 4/4 ^{I} class were also the first RhB electric locomotives without rod drive.

== History ==
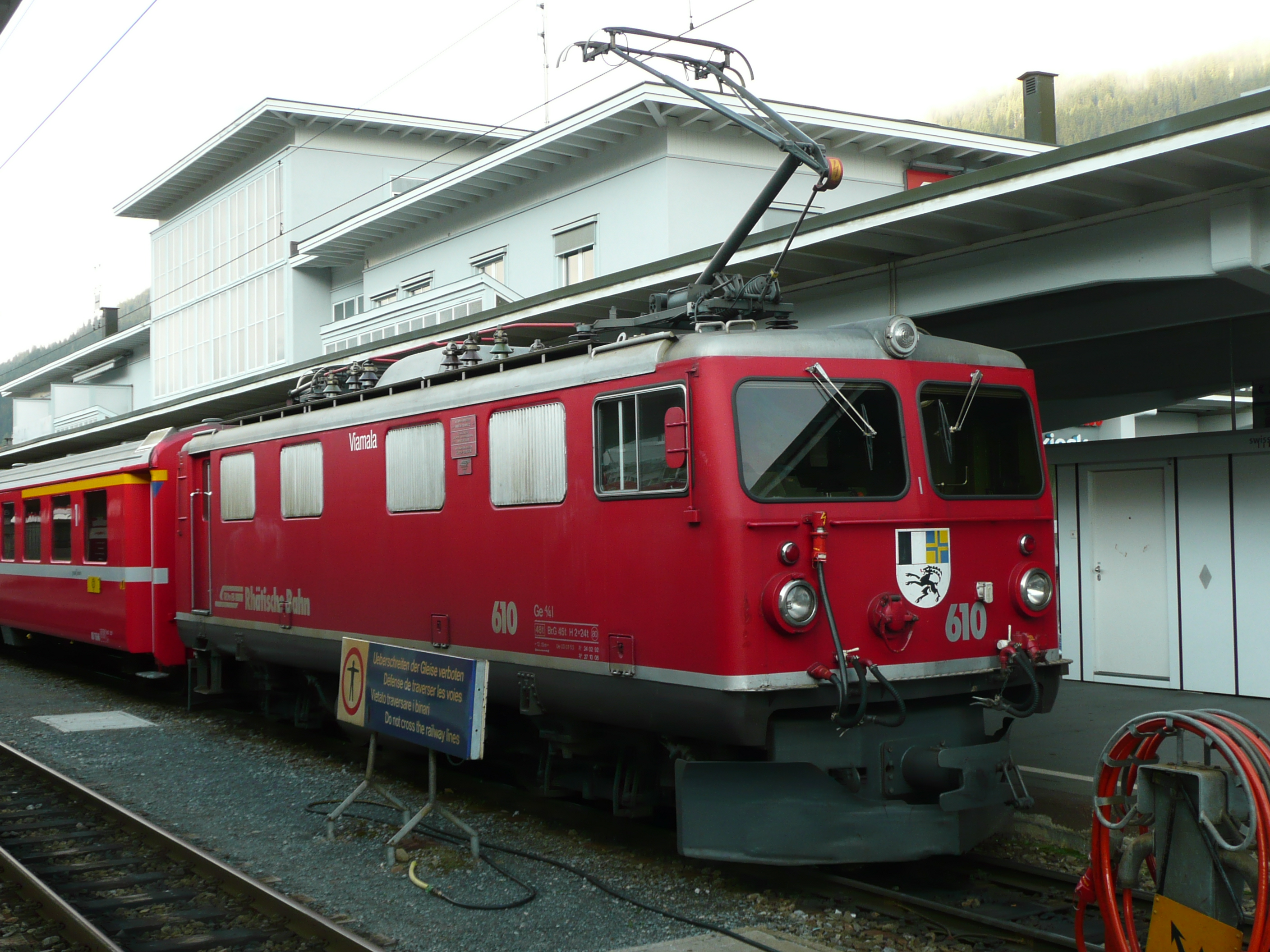
Ge 4/4 ^{I} No. 610 Viamala in Davos.

In 1944, the Rhaetian Railway ordered four Ge 4/4 ^{I} class locomotives from the Swiss Locomotive and Machine Works (SLM). The first of these machines was commissioned in July 1947. In service primarily in the haulage of fast trains, they proved themselves so well that in 1953 the Rhaetian Railway ordered six further examples.

The later entry into service of the Ge 6/6 ^{II} and the Ge 4/4 ^{II} class locomotives led to the cascading of the Ge 4/4 ^{I} class into lesser responsibilities.

Between 1986 and 1991, the Ge 4/4 ^{I} class was completely modernised. For example, the old cab fronts with their communication doors were replaced with new cab fronts. Since their modernisation, the locomotives in the class have continued to render loyal service to the Rhaetian Railway right up to today.

== Specifications ==
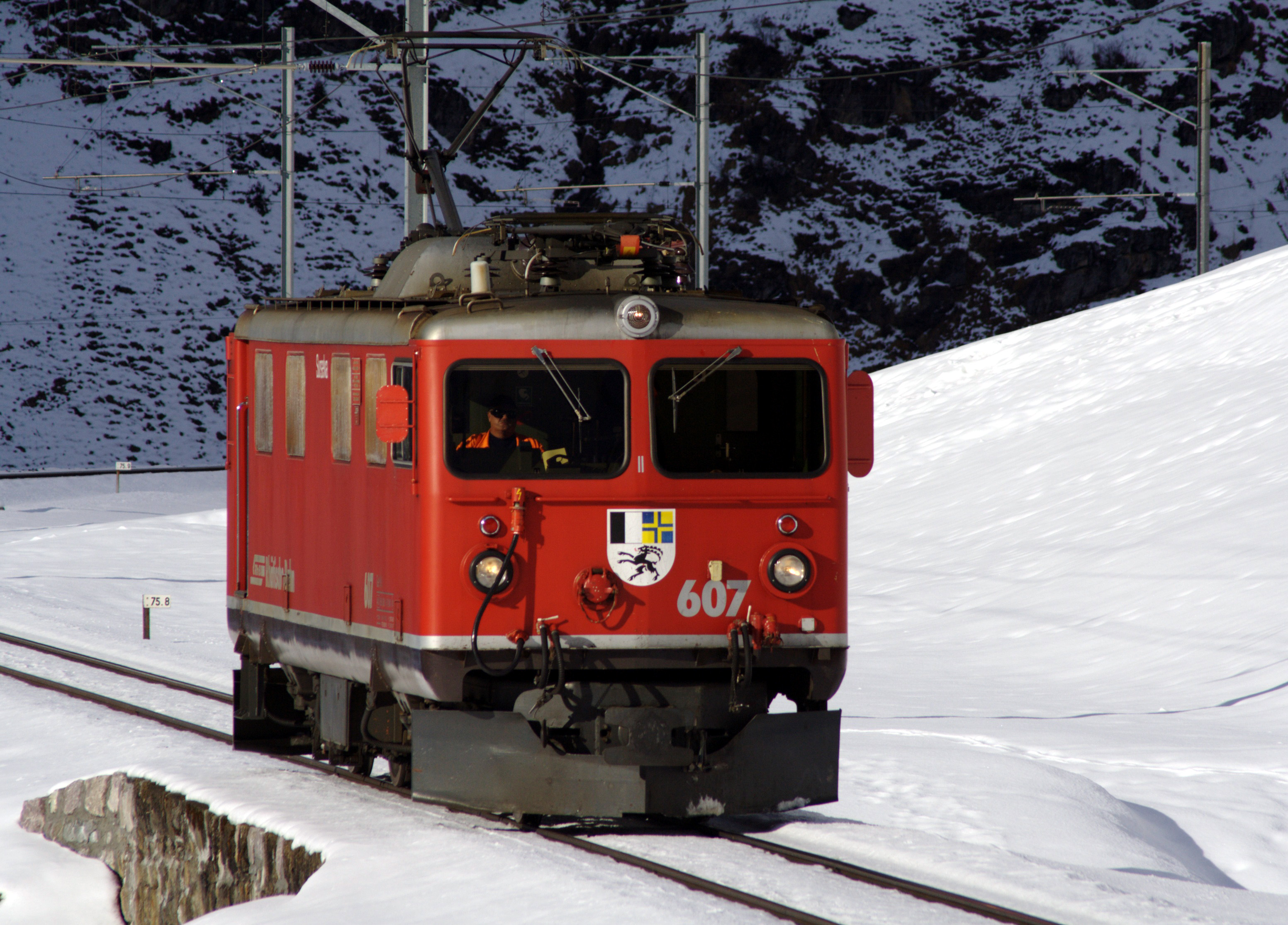
Ge 4/4 ^{I} No. 607 Surselva.

The Ge 4/4 ^{I} class locomotives presently have a top speed of 80 kilometres per hour (50 mph) (originally 75 kilometres per hour or 47 miles per hour) and a power output of 1,184 kilowatts (1,588 hp). They now weigh 48 tonnes (47 long tons; 53 short tons) (originally 47 tonnes or 46 long tons or 52 short tons) and are 12,100 millimetres (39 ft 8 in) long.

Beginning in 1997, the Ge 4/4 ^{I} class's old diamond-shaped pantographs were replaced by new single-arm pantographs, to enable deployment of the class on the Chur-Arosa line, which at that time was having its electrification system changed.

The names of the 10 locomotives in the class commemorate the names of certain valleys, mountains and mountain ranges in Graubünden. The names are located high on the left and right sides of the locomotives, in white script on a red background. The service numbers 601–610 are on both cab ends, and also on the lower sides.

== Current operations ==
An important present day area of operation for the Ge 4/4 ^{I} class is the Rhaetian Railway line from Davos to Filisur, with its many tunnels. Since December 2004, the class has operated three car push-pull trains, consisting of a Steuerwagen BDt 172x, an Einheitswagen I B and an Einheitswagen III A, on this line. Previously, modernised centre entry cars were used on these services. Between Davos and Filisur, the introduction of the push pull trains has reduced the operating requirement to one consist of cars, instead of the two sets that were previously required.

In winter, the Ge 4/4 ^{I} class also hauls the Bergün-Preda-Bergün toboggan trains, and a few other wintersport trains in Prättigau.

== Disposal and preservation ==
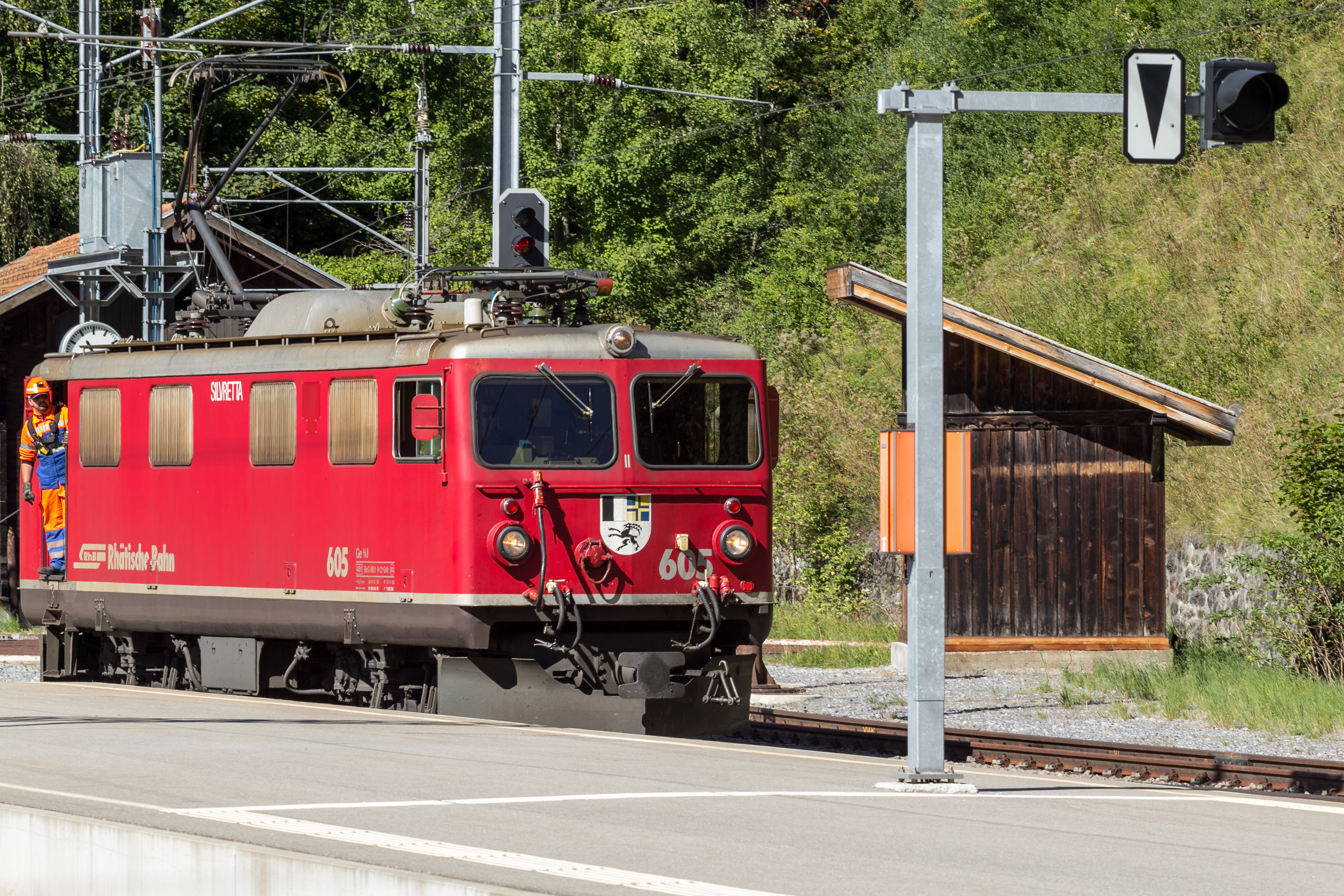
Ge 4/4 I 605 Silvretta in Filisur

During November 2010, the Rhaetian Railways began taking most of the locomotives of this series after more than 50 years of service, and within a year six of them were scrapped. From the remaining four three are still existing nowadays, and two of them should be preserved as historic vehicles.

Locomotive 602 named "Bernina" was passed on March 7, 2012, to the Museum of Transport, in Lucerne on a five-year loan but returned earlier to Landquart for service again. It should be preserved with a restoration in its original condition. Locomotice 603 "Badus" was meant to preserved in the Museum Augsburg Railway Park in Germany, but this plan has failed, its future is unclear. Locomotive 605 "Silvretta" is operational even nowdays, and should be preserved in its current condition.

== List of locomotives ==
The following locomotives in the class have served on the Rhaetian Railway:

List of the Ge 4/4 ^{I} locomotives of the Rhaetian Railway
Traffic number	Name	Commissioning	Status
601	Albula	8 July 1947	scrapped November 2010
602	Bernina	21 July 1947	exhibited the Transport Museum in Lucerne on a five-year loan, from March 2012, but returned to RhB at 16, November 16, 2015, out of service since 2022, to be restored as a historic locomotive in its original condition
603	Badus	13 August 1947	stored in Landquart
604	Calanda	23 August 1947	scrapped March 2011
605	Silvretta	12 March 1953	in service, to be preserved in its last operational condition
606	Kesch	15 June 1953	scrapped in April 2011
607	Surselva	24 April 1953	scrapped in March 2011
608	Madrisa	15 June 1953	scrapped in March 2011
609	Linard	13 May 1953	scrapped in May 2011
610	Viamala	3 July 1953	foreseen as historic locomotive, but scrapped on 13. March 2025

== See also ==
- History of rail transport in Switzerland
- Rail transport in Switzerland
