= Rhaetian Railway =

Swiss transport company

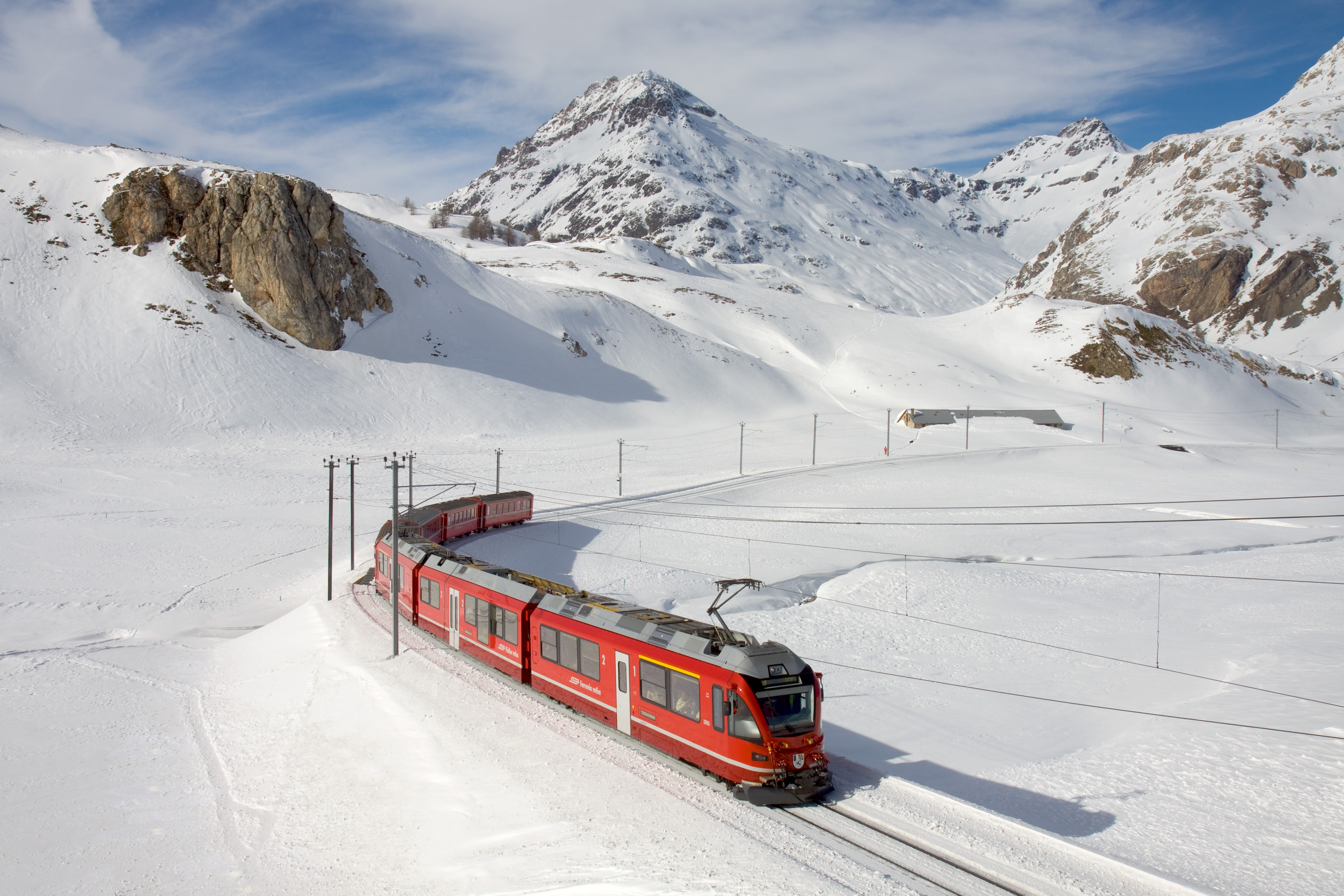
- Stadler Allegra approaching the Bernina Pass.

Overview
- Native name: Rhätische Bahn, Ferrovia retica, Viafier retica
- Status: operating
- Owner: Canton of Grisons (51.3%); Swiss Federal Railways (43.1%)
- Locale: Canton of Grisons, Switzerland, Lombardy, Italy
- Stations: 102
- Website: www.rhb.ch

Service
- Type: Commuter and heavy rail
- Services: 10
- Ridership: 12 Million per year

History
- Opened: 1888; 138 years ago

Technical
- Line length: 385 km (239 mi)
- Character: Mountain railway
- Track gauge: 1,000 mm (3 ft 3 3/8 in)
- Electrification: 11 kV 16 2/3 Hz (322 km); 1000 V DC (62 km, Bernina line)
- Operating speed: 100 km/h (62 mph)
- Highest elevation: 2,254 m (7,395 ft)
Route map

The Rhaetian Railway (German: Rhätische Bahn; Italian: Ferrovia retica; Romansh: Viafier retica), abbreviated RhB, is a Swiss transport company that operates the second-largest railway system in Switzerland after the Swiss Federal Railways (SBB CFF FFS). Headquartered in Chur, the RhB operates all the railway lines of the Swiss canton of Grisons, except for the line from Sargans to the cantonal capital, Chur, which is operated by Swiss Federal Railways, as well as the line from Disentis/Mustér to the Oberalp Pass and further on to Andermatt, Uri, which is operated by Matterhorn Gotthard Bahn (MGB). Inaugurated in 1888 and expanded from 1896 onwards in various sections, the RhB network is located almost entirely within Grisons, with one station across the Italian border at Tirano. The system is majority-owned by the government of Grisons with the Swiss Federal Railways holding a large minority share.

The Rhaetian Railway serves a number of major tourist destinations, such as St. Moritz and Davos. One of the RhB lines, the Bernina Railway, crosses the Bernina Pass at 2,254 metres (7,395 ft) above sea level and runs down to Tirano, Lombardy in Italy.

In 2008, the RhB section from the Albula/Bernina area (the part from Thusis to Tirano, including St. Moritz) was added to the list of UNESCO World Heritage Sites. The Albula-Bernina line is the first rail line in the world to be photographed and put on Google Street View. The line also operates several historic trains on the network.

== History ==
Rhaetian Railway

Technical
- Rack system: None
- Track gauge: 1,000 mm (3 ft 3 3/8 in) metre gauge
- Electrification: 11 kV 16 2/3 Hz (322 km); 1000 V DC (62 km, Bernina line)
- Maximum incline: Bernina line: 7%

The establishment of the Rhaetian Railway traces back to Willem Jan Holsboer, a Dutchman who owned a hotel in Davos. He proposed a railway line from Landquart to Davos in 1888. Holsboer founded the Landquart-Davos AG to begin construction of a standard-gauge line, but the mountainous terrain lacked sufficient space. On 29 June 1888, a ground-breaking ceremony took place for a narrow-gauge railway instead. By 1890, the railway line served Davos.

In 1895, Holsboer changed his company's name to the Rhaetian Railway (Rhätische Bahn) to reflect his plans for network expansion. The first director of the Rhaetian Railway was engineer Achilles Schucan, who served the company in various roles from its foundation in 1888 to 1918. Under his direction, the company expanded from a single line to a rail network covering a substantial part of the canton of Grisons.

By 1896, the lines Chur–Landquart and Chur–Thusis were operating. Following a referendum in June 1897, a cantonal railway act was passed and the canton of Grisons acquired a majority stake of the Rhaetian Railway, thereby making it the ‘state railway’ of the Grisons.

This was followed by the opening of Albula line in 1903, which connected Thusis with Celerina, and was extended to St. Moritz in 1904. During the years 1907 to 1913, the Rhaetian Railway, in collaboration with the federal and cantonal governments, undertook a large-scale expansion of its network.

All RhB lines are 1,000 mm (3 ft 3 3/8 in) metre gauge wide and electrified:

- 61 km (37.9 mi) (the Bernina Railway from St Moritz to Tirano) is electrified at 1000 V DC.
- 321 km (199.5 mi) is electrified at 11 kV 16.7 Hz (including since 1997 Chur-Arosa and the new Vereina tunnel).

The network contains 84 tunnels (the longest being the 19.042-kilometre (11.832 mi) Vereina Tunnel, opened on 19 November 1999, and the 5.864-kilometre (3.644 mi) Albula Tunnel including the new bore opened in 2024 and 383 bridges. The maximum gradient is 7% on the Bernina railway, 6% on the Chur–Arosa line and 4.5% on Landquart–Davos line.

In 2022, to celebrate the 175th anniversary of Switzerland's first railway, the Rhaetische Bahn, supported by Swiss train-builder Stadler, came together to run the world's longest-ever passenger train, composed of 100 cars stretching almost two kilometres long.

== Network ==
The Rhaetian Railway operates a 385-kilometre-long railway network with 10 railway lines and 102 stations.

In 2002 the annual traffic carried by the RhB was 300 million passenger-kilometres and 54 million tonne-kilometres of freight. 80% of the passenger income comes from tourist traffic, although 40% of passengers are local commuters.

=== Current lines ===
==== Landquart–Davos line ====
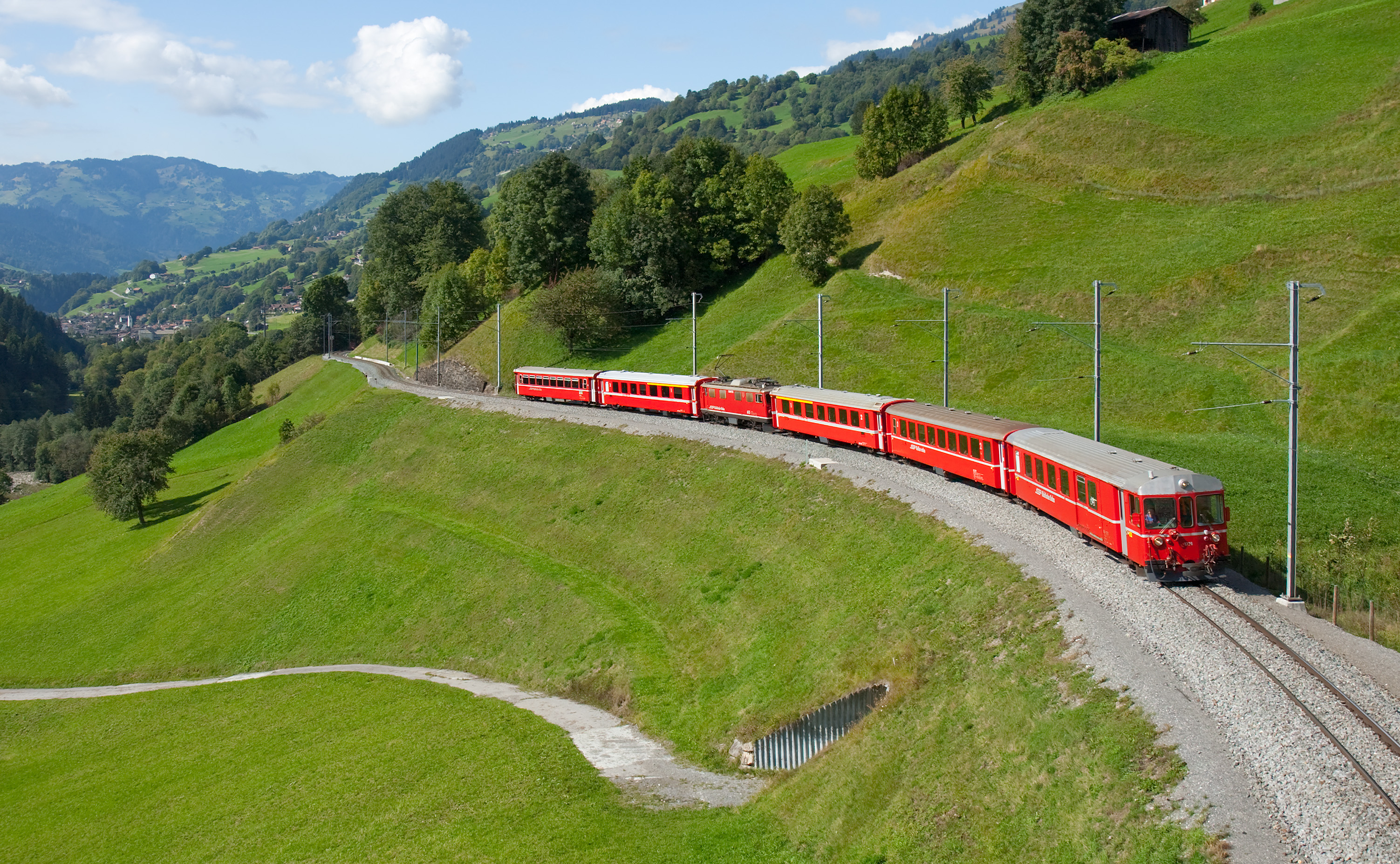
Ge 4/4 ^{I} with push–pull train and two extra coaches shortly before arriving in Saas. Küblis is visible in the valley at left.

Landquart railway station in Graubünden is the starting point of the Rhaetian Railway, historically as part of the Landquart-Davos line, operationally as the company's main workshop, and topologically as the 0 kilometre point of the company's core network. The Landquart-Davos line is the oldest in the Rhaetian Railway network.

After leaving Landquart, the line to Davos generally follows the river Landquart upstream as far as Klosters Platz. Along the way, it crosses the river three times and passes by the award-winning Sunniberg Bridge, the centerpiece of the Klosters bypass road.

Just south of Klosters Platz, the tracks cross the river the last time and come to two tunnels. One of these is for the Vereina line (see below). The other, the Klosters loop tunnel, takes the Davos line through a 90-degree loop towards the west. The line to Davos begins to climb at 4.5% gradient and then loops 180 degrees back towards the east, inside the Cavadürli loop tunnel. It continues to climb through dense larch and other coniferous forests to the Davos Laret.

The highest point on the line is the next stop, Davos Wolfgang at 1,625 m (5,331 ft). Then the line leads back down and along Lake Davos to Davos Dorf, and the terminus at Davos Platz.

==== Davos–Filisur line ====
The line connects Davos Platz to the Albula Railway at Filisur. It is 19 km (12 mi) long, includes 14 tunnels totaling 4,200 m (13,780 ft) in length, and crosses 28 bridges, including the Wiesen Viaduct. The line was electrified in 1919.

==== Landquart–Thusis line ====
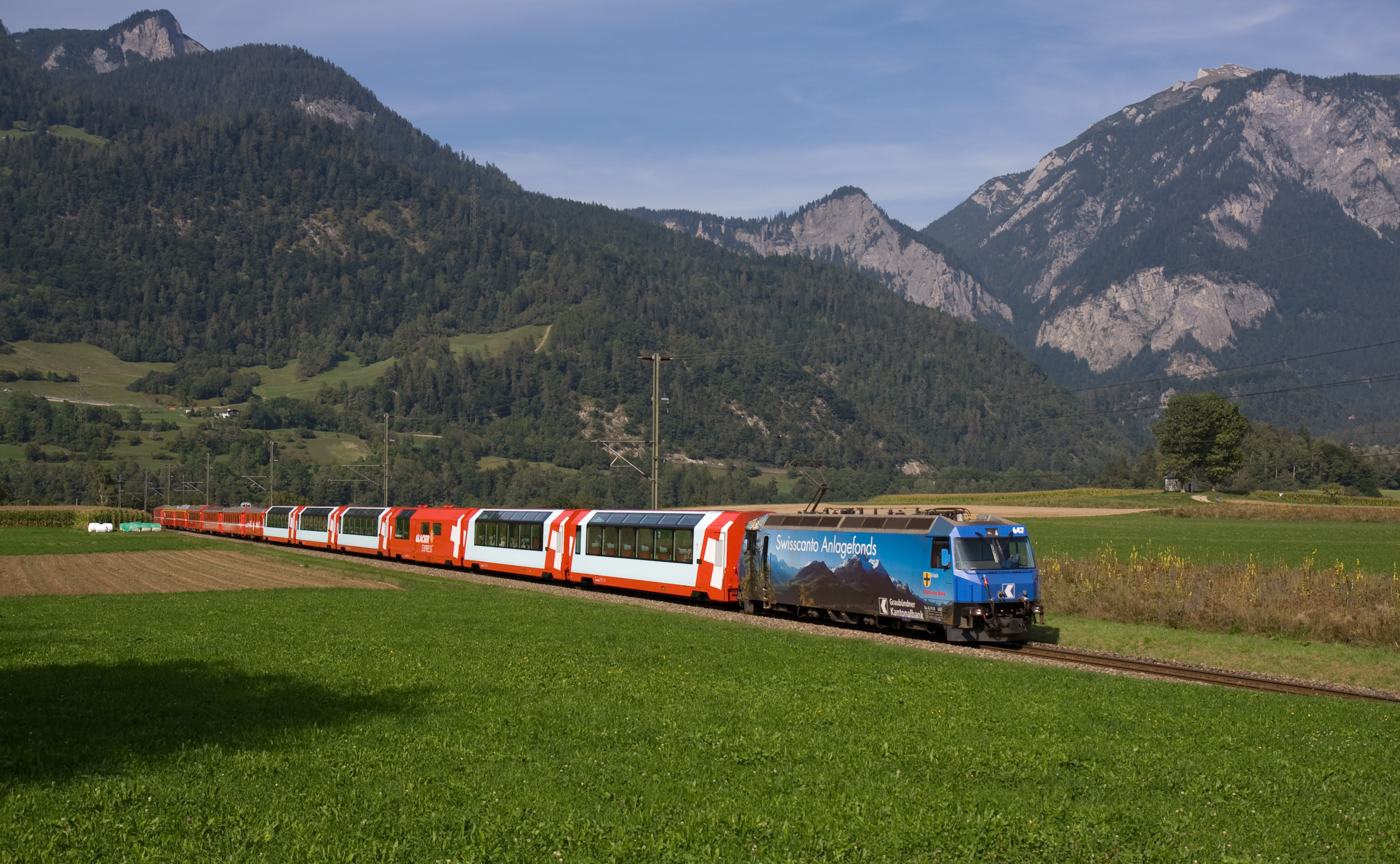
Glacier Express between Reichenau-Tamins and Bonaduz.

Starting in the Rhine valley, the Landquart-Thusis line runs more or less parallel with the Swiss Federal Railways' Sargans-Landquart-Chur standard gauge line as far as Chur (elevation 585 m or 1,919 ft). The line to Thusis then simply follows the course of the Rhine to Bonaduz (655 m or 2,149 ft). From there, it enters the Domleschg Valley and follows the Posterior Rhine from Rhäzüns (658 m or 2,159 ft) to Thusis (697 m or 2,287 ft).

==== Albula line (Thusis–St. Moritz) ====
This line begins in Thusis (elevation 697 m [2,287 ft]). It continues toward Tiefencastel (851 m [2,792 ft]) following the Albula and then crosses the Landwasser Viaduct before arriving at Filisur (1,032 m [3,386 ft]). Shortly after Filisur the line passes its first spiral tunnel then continues to Bergün/Bravuogn (1,373 m [4,505 ft]).

Between Bergün/Bravuogn and Preda (1,789 m [5,869 ft]), at the end of the valley, the line has to achieve a difference in height of about 400 m (1,300 ft) within a horizontal distance of 5 km (3.1 mi), without using rack-and-pinion, but with many spirals. Then the line enters the Albula Tunnel at 1,815 metres under the Albula Pass. It emerges in the Val Bever, where it reaches Bever (1,708 m [5,604 ft]) on the Engadin plain. The line continues toward Samedan (1,721 m [5,646 ft]) and arrives at St. Moritz (1,775 m [5,823 ft]).

In 2009 it was announced that an examination of the Albula Tunnel conducted in 2006 had found major degradation of the tunnel, with over 60% of the lining in need of replacement. Furthermore, the bores are small by modern standards, and cabling, signalling and drainage all need replacement. As a result, it was announced that an inquiry would decide between two options for action: a comprehensive renewal of the existing tunnel, or the construction of a new bore to modern standards. As a result of this inquiry, RhB decided to build a new tunnel. Construction began in 2015, with the new tunnel opening in 2022 and the project completed including refurbishment of the old tunnel in 2023.

==== Reichenau–Disentis/Mustér line ====
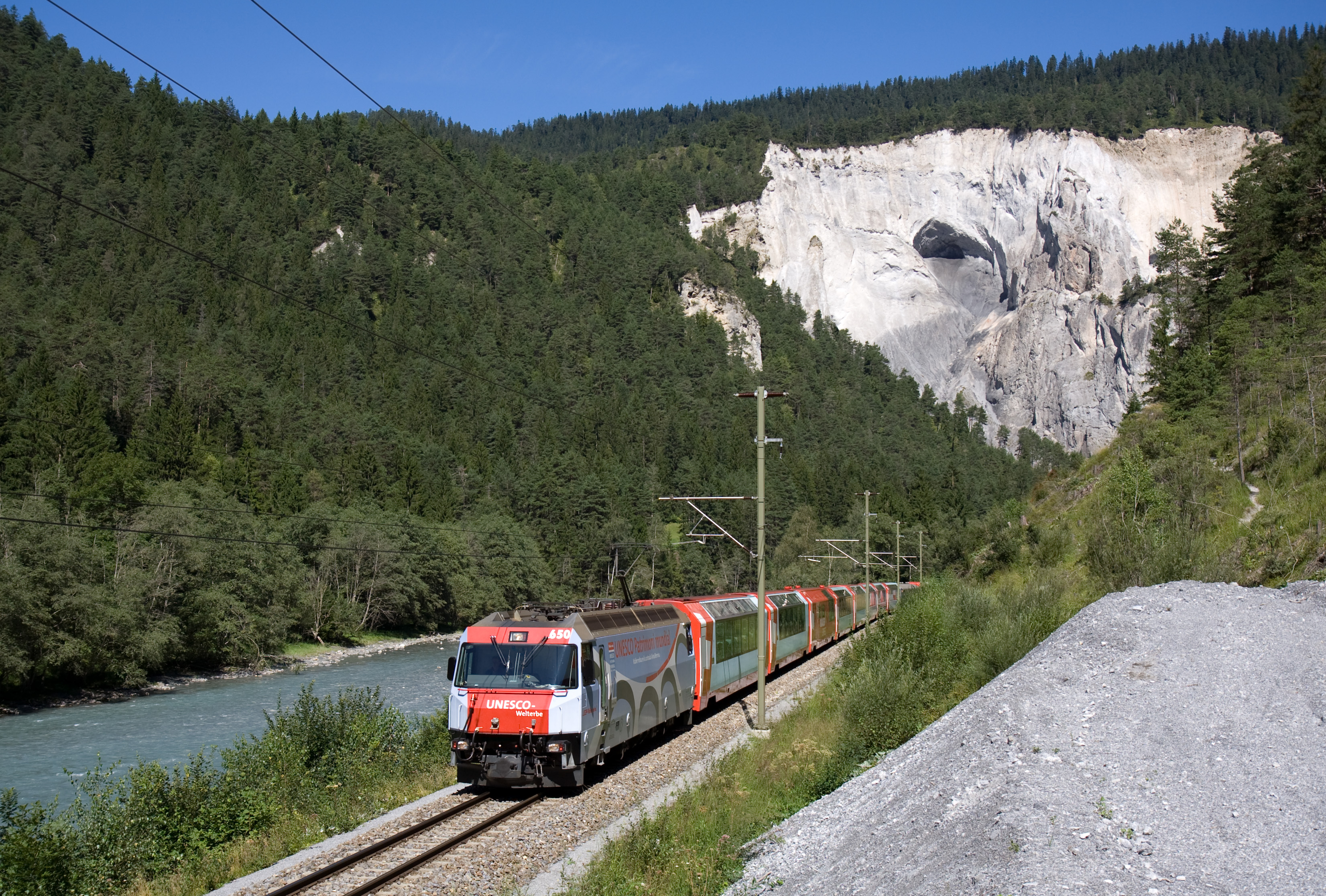
Two Glacier Expresses coupled together run through the Rhine gorge.

The Reichenau to Disentis/Mustér line links the rest of the Rhaetian Railway network with the Matterhorn Gotthard Bahn. It branches from the line to Thusis behind the shared Rhine bridge.

The line, which was opened progressively between 1903 and 1912, has been electrified since 1922.

In contrast with the accompanying road, which rises about 500 m (1,600 ft) towards Flims and Laax, the railway to Disentis/Mustér runs slowly up the narrow "Ruinaulta gorge". On this part of the line, its associated engineering structures dominate the otherwise pristine natural landscape.

At Ilanz, the railway line and road merge paths once again. Their combined pathways then rise slowly and evenly to Disentis/Mustér.

The main traffic on the Reichenau–Disentis/Mustér line is RegioExpress passenger trains operating at hourly intervals. Several times a day, there are Glacier Express trains in each direction.

Timetabled goods trains also operate on the line to serve industry in the Vorderrhein area and supplied cement for the construction of the normal gauge Gotthard Base Tunnel with train IDs starting with 5. Usually three pairs of trains serve Disentis/Mustér with a Ge 6/6 II and a few additional trains go only to Ilanz with a Ge 4/4 II.

==== Engadin line (Pontresina–Scuol-Tarasp) ====
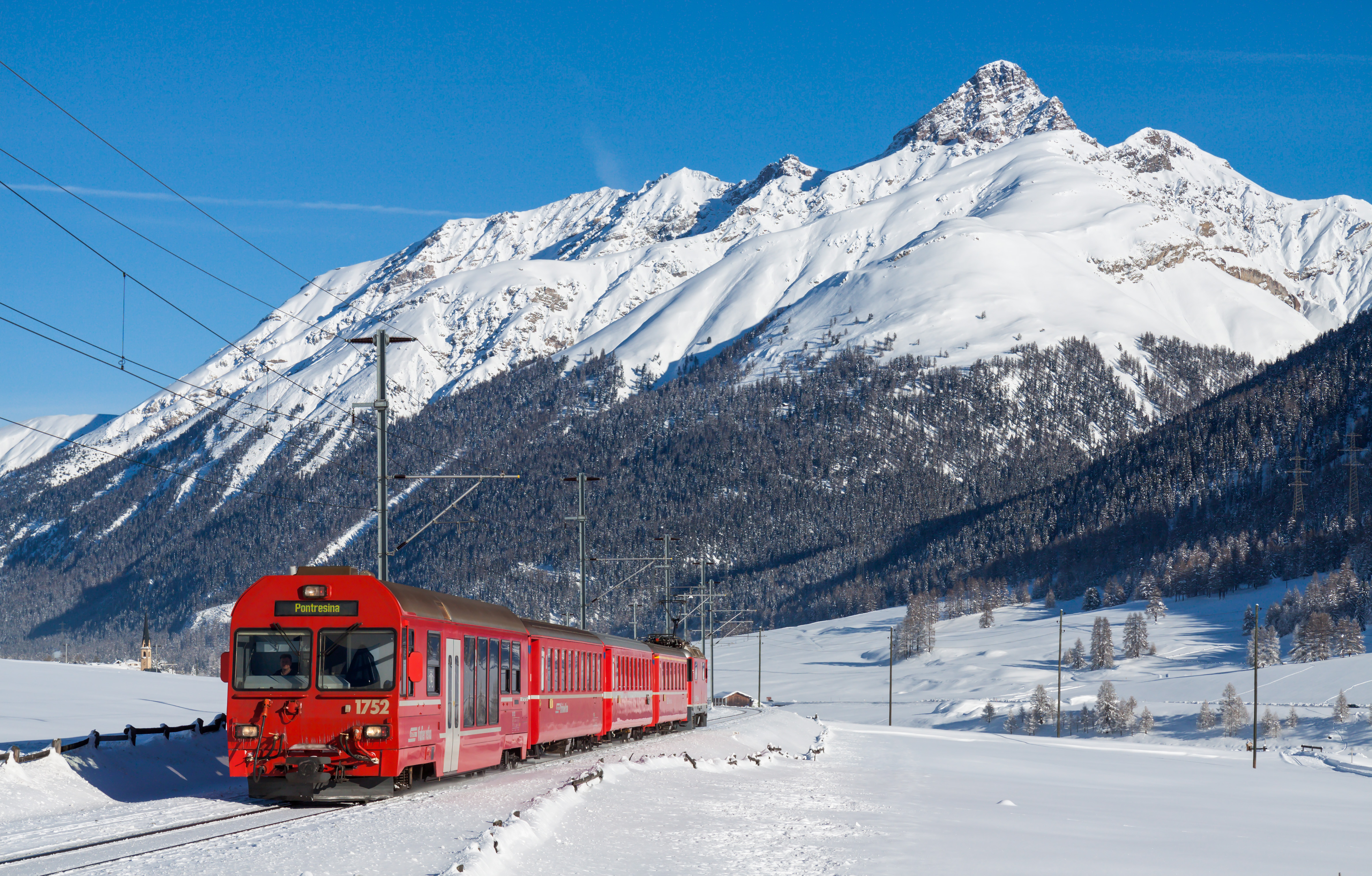
A push-pull train typical of the Engadin line, near Zuoz.

This line, which runs up the Engadin valley, was constructed in two stages. The Samedan–Pontresina section was opened on by the Rhaetian Railway on 1 July 1908, simultaneously with the Pontresina–Morteratsch section, which formed part of the then-independent Bernina Railway. The actual Engadine line, between Bever and Scuol-Tarasp, was opened on 1 July 1913, and was the first Rhaetian Railway line to be electrified from the start at 11 kV 16 2/3 Hz AC.

Since the opening of the Engadin line, Pontresina has been a dual system station, as the Bernina Railway operates on 1,000 V DC. Track 3 at Pontresina station has a switchable catenary, and is used for trains, such as the Heidi Express, operating through the station and needing to change from one of the two electrification systems to the other.

Between Samedan and Bever, the Engadin line shares its track with the Albula Railway. With the opening of the Vereina Tunnel and line in November 1999, the Engadin line, at both Lavin (Sagliains car shuttle train station) and Susch (Sasslatsch II car shuttle train station), acquired a direct connection to the Prättigau at Klosters, on the Landquart–Davos line.

==== Bernina line (St. Moritz–Tirano) ====
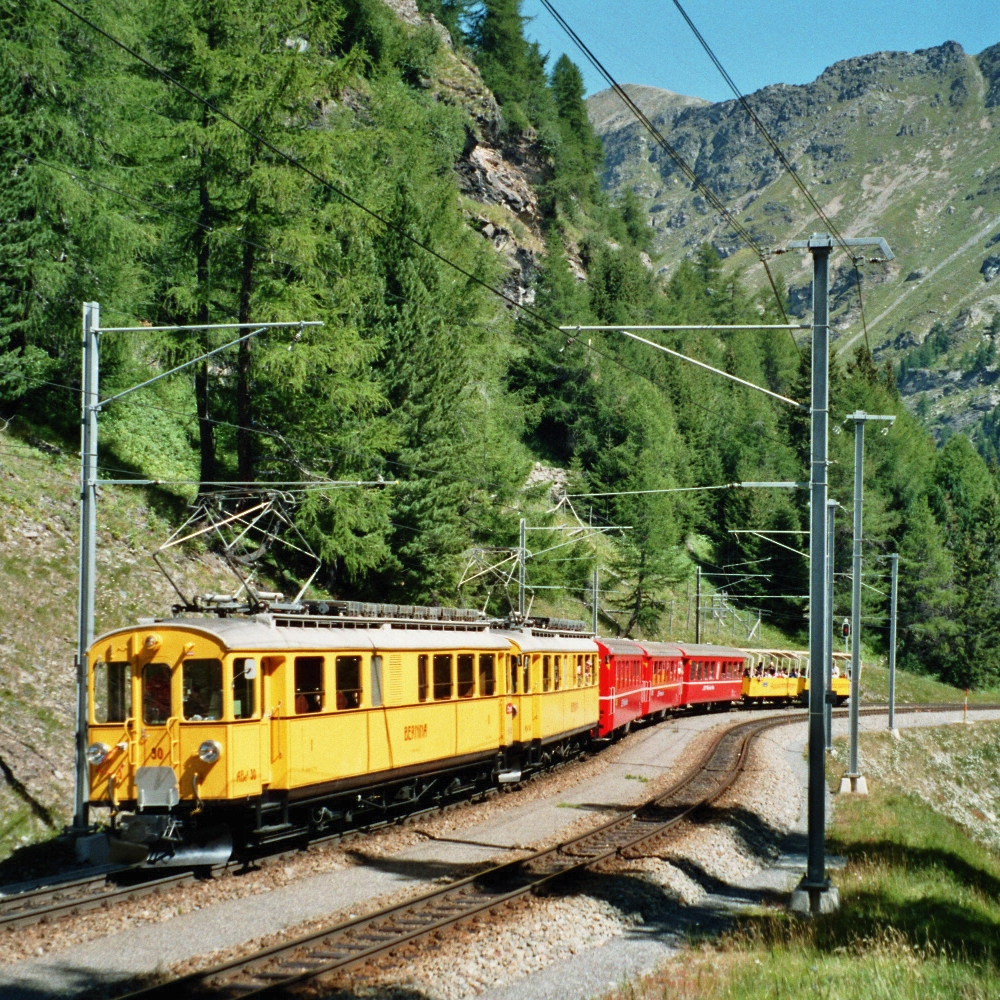
Historic train operated on the Bernina line

This line begins at St.Moritz and runs towards Pontresina (elevation 1,774 m [5,820 ft]) in Val Bernina. It ascends progressively through the valley to the Bernina Pass over the Morteratsch station (1,896 m [6,220 ft]) (with the Morteratsch Glacier and Piz Bernina, the highest summit of the Eastern Alps, in sight). After Morteratsch, the line runs towards Bernina Diavolezza (2,093 m [6,867 ft]), where an aerial tramway leads to Diavolezza, and Ospizio Bernina station. This station, next to Lago Bianco, stands at the line's summit at 2,253 m (7,392 ft) above sea and holds the title of the highest point of the entire Rhetian Railway network and among all adhesion railways in Europe.

Alp Grüm (2,091 m [6,860 ft]) is the first station to the immediate south of the summit. It is situated above Lago Palü and right below Piz Palü and Palü Glacier. After negotiating many hairpin turns, the line reaches Cavaglia (1,693 m [5,554 ft]) above Val Poschiavo; after that, the line descends across the valley towards the Swiss Italian-speaking town of Poschiavo (1,014 m [3,327 ft]).

After Poschiavo, the line runs next to Lago Poschiavo and calls at Le Prese (964 m [3,163 ft]) and Miralago (965 m [3,166 ft]). The descent continues towards Brusio (780 m [2,560 ft]), after which the line runs across the famous spiral bridge, Brusio Viaduct. After the spiral bridge, the line passes through the Swiss border town of Campocologno (553 m [1,814 ft]) before entering Italy at Tirano RhB station (430 m [1,410 ft]).

==== Arosa line (Chur–Arosa) ====
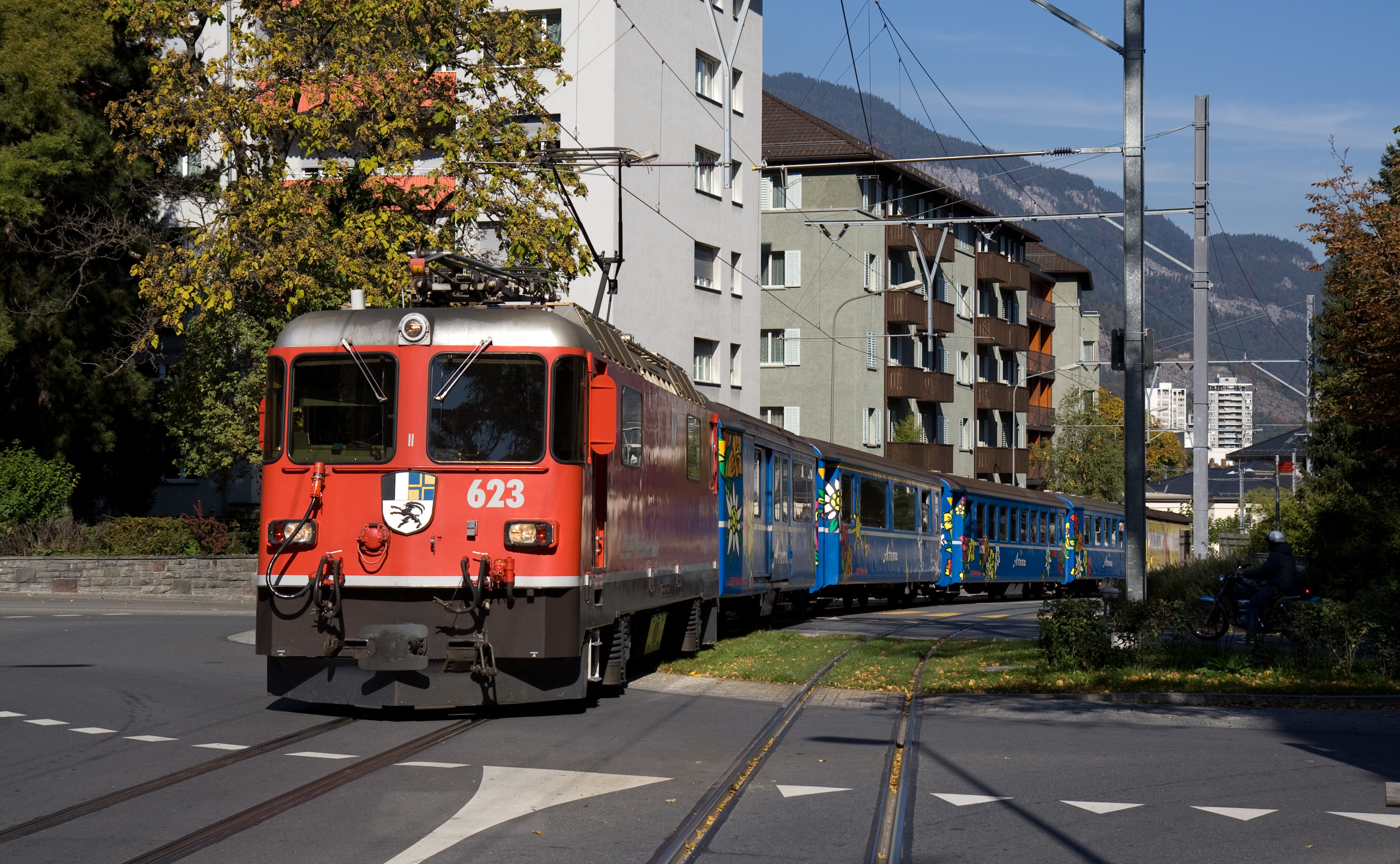
An Arosa line train pulled by a Ge 4/4 ^{II} electric locomotive on Engadinstrasse (part of the Stadtbahn) in Chur.

The 25.68-kilometre (15.96 mi) railway line from Chur to Arosa is known as the Arosabahn (or Arosa-Bahn), and is often abbreviated as "ChA" (Chur-Arosa). Work began in 1912 on the route and the line opened on 12 December 1914. The railway leads up from Chur to Arosa (a total climb of 1,155 m or 3,789 ft) via a number of tunnels, bridges and other structures, including the Langwieser Viaduct - a structure of national importance. In 1942 the line became part of the RhB company and network; however the line ran on a separate electric system to the remainder of the network until 1997. Before then it was 2400 V DC - now it is 11 kV 16.7 Hz AC. The gauge has always been 1,000 mm (3 ft 3 3/8 in) as per the rest of the RhB network.

It is a single track railway, with the exception of a short double track section along Engadinstrasse in Chur, with a number of passing loops along the route: at all stations with the exception of Chur Stadt (and formerly Sassal), as well as at Chur Sand depot and at Haspelgrube near Arosa. The maximum incline is 6% but there is no rack-and-pinion used.

A short section of the line runs along the streets of Chur and is known as the Chur stadtbahn ('town railway'). In Chur, the line starts on Bahnhofplatz, in front of the main railway station, where that station's platforms for the Arosabahn are, though there is a second stop in Chur only 760 m (2,490 ft) from the main station.

A 5 km (3.1 mi) tunnel through the Mittenberg had been planned as an alternative route for the lower section of the line, avoiding running through the centre of Chur. This plan was finally dropped in 1996 as the considerable expense could not be justified.

The line is well used by tourists coming to and from the resort at Arosa. The line also carries a substantial amount of freight.

=== Former lines ===
==== Bellinzona–Mesocco line ====
This line is not connected to the others. It opened in 1907 and was owned by the Rhaetian Railway between 1942 and 2003. Passenger services ceased in 1972, but a limited freight traffic continued until 2003. The private association (SEFT, Società Esercizio Ferroviario Turistico) operated it as a heritage railway for tourists over 13 kilometres (8.1 mi) of the original 31 kilometres (19 mi) of line until part of the concession was withdrawn in 2013 to allow a road to be built. The road construction started in July 2014.

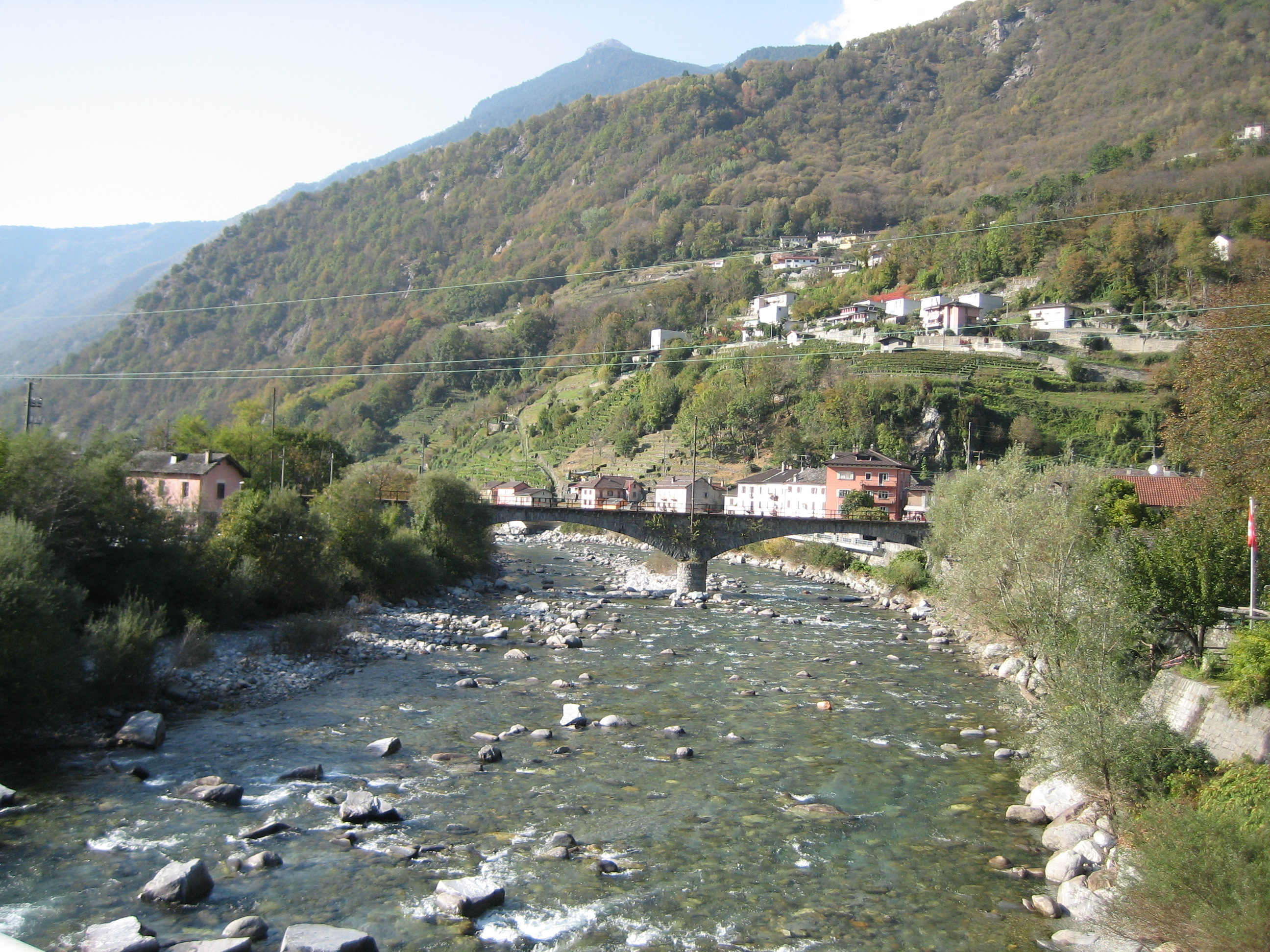
Moesa III bridge 46°14′16″N 9°7′54″E

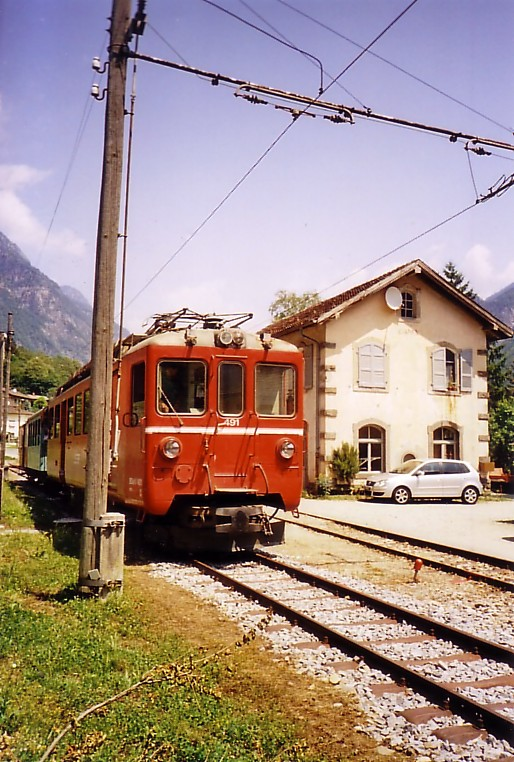
Cama station 46°16′21″N 9°10′09″E

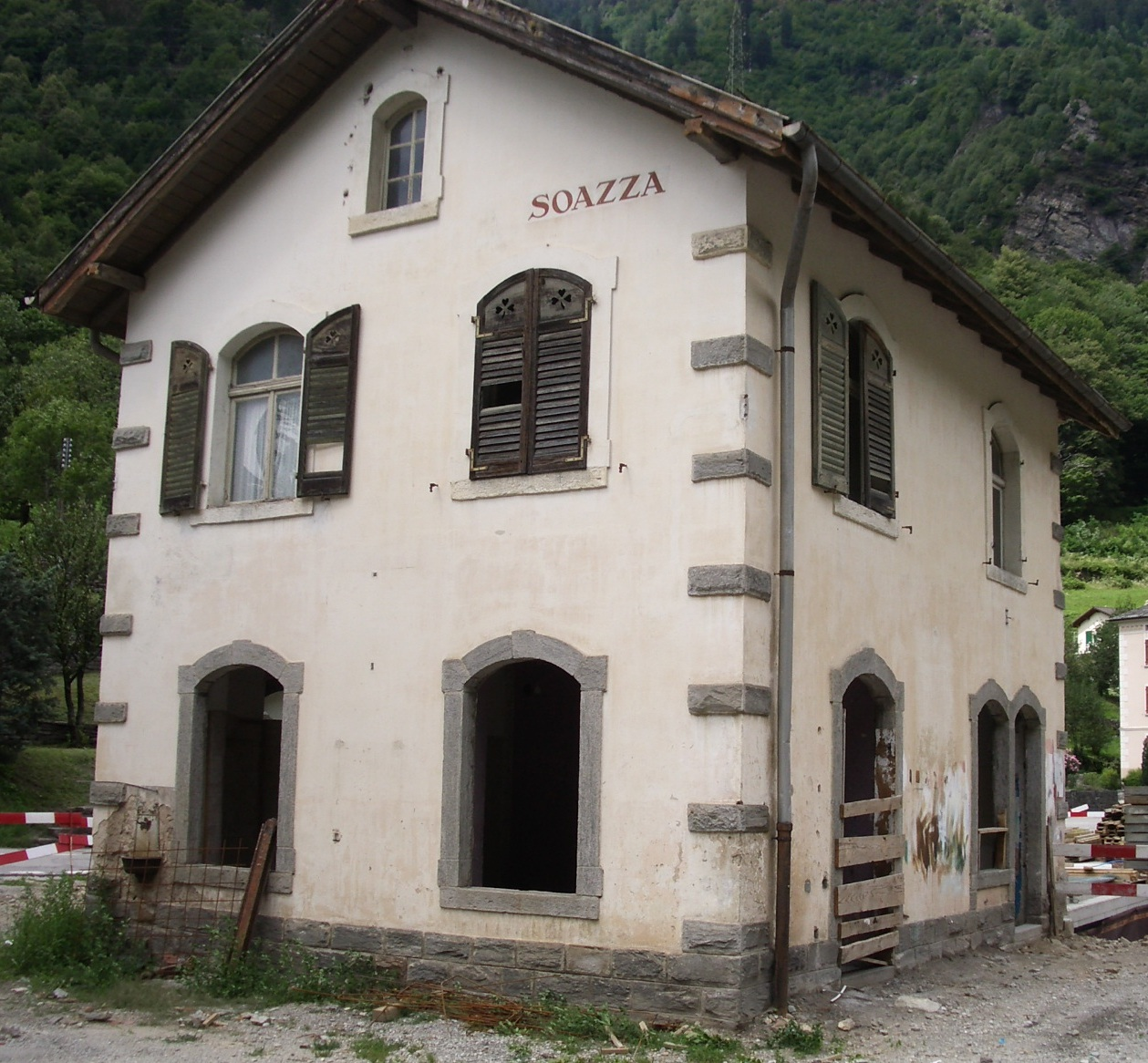
Soazza station 46°22′02.8″N 9°13′22.5″E

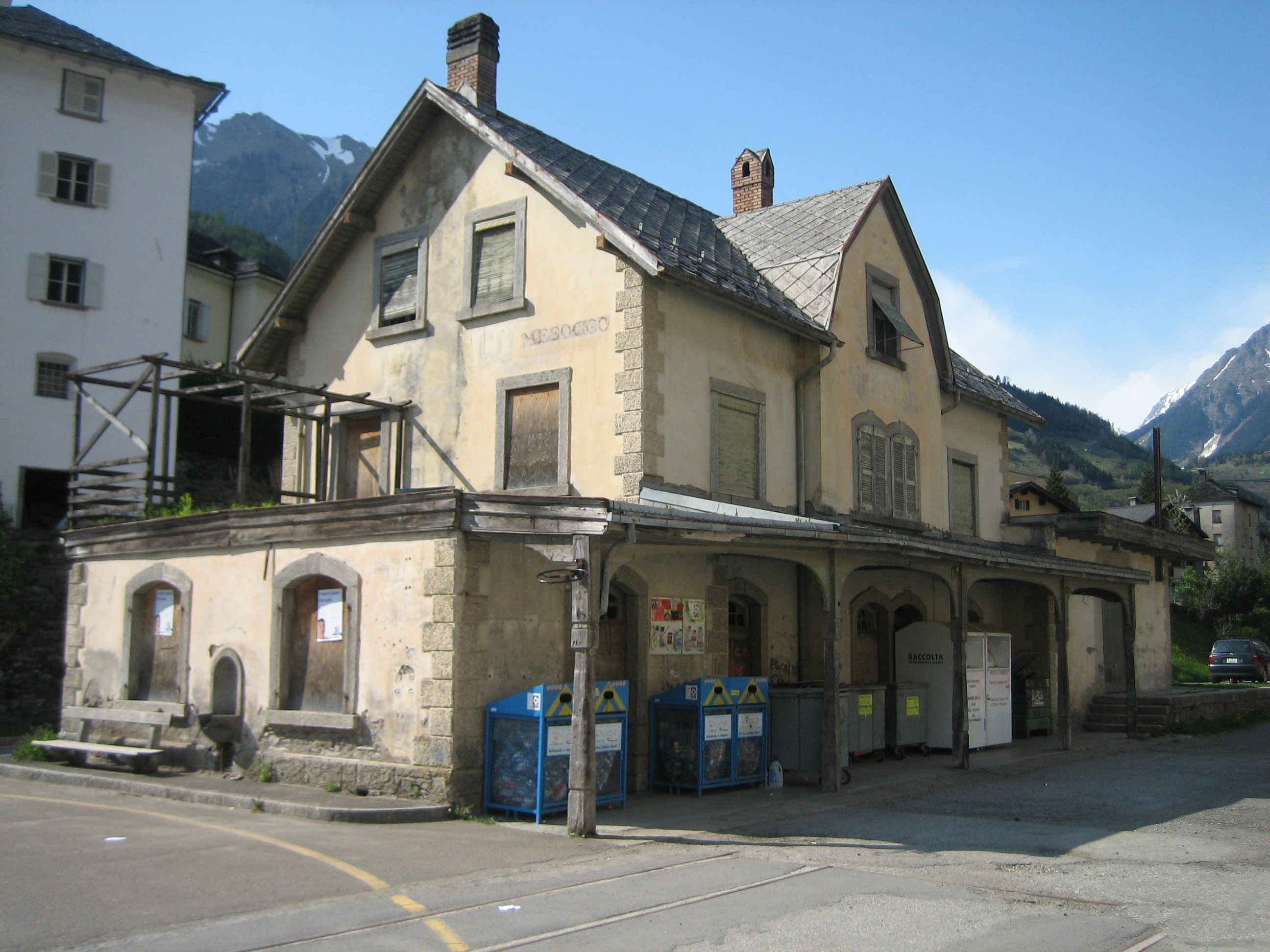
Mesocco station 46°23′24.7″N 9°14′02.3″E

=== Passenger services ===
The RhB operates regular InterRegio (IR), RegioExpress (RE), and Regio (R) services, as well as the Chur S-Bahn. In addition, two Panorama Express (PE) services are operated on the Rhaetian Railway network, namely the

- Bernina Express (Chur / St. Moritz – Tirano),
- Glacier Express (Zermatt – Andermatt – Chur – St. Moritz),

of which the former is operated by the RhB, and the latter is jointly owned and operated by the RhB and the Matterhorn Gotthard Bahn.

The regular daytime passenger services (as of December 2025) are as follows:

Timetable No.	Service		Route		Frequency	Notes
910/915	RE 13	RE 1	Landquart – Schiers – Klosters Platz –	Davos Platz – Filisur	Hourly	Services divide/couple at Klosters Platz
910/915	RE 13	RE 3	Landquart – Schiers – Klosters Platz –	Zernez – Samedan – St. Moritz	Hourly	Services divide/couple at Klosters Platz
910/915	RE 24	RE 2	Landquart – Schiers – Klosters Platz –	Davos Platz	Hourly	Services divide/couple at Klosters Platz
910/915	RE 24	RE 4	Landquart – Schiers – Klosters Platz –	Sagliains – Scuol-Tarasp	Hourly	Services divide/couple at Klosters Platz
920	RE 7		Chur – Ilanz – Disentis/Mustér		Hourly	Half-hourly service from Chur to Ilanz
920	RE 5		Chur – Ilanz – (Disentis/Mustér)		Hourly	Half-hourly service from Chur to Ilanz
930	RE 6 / R 16		Chur – Arosa		Hourly	
940	IR 38		Chur – Reichenau-Tamins – Thusis – Filisur – Samedan – St. Moritz		Hourly	Half-hourly service from Chur to Thusis.
940	RE 8		Chur – Rhäzüns – Thusis		Hourly	Half-hourly service from Chur to Thusis.
941	S 1		Schiers – Landquart – Chur – Reichenau-Tamins – Rhäzüns – Thusis		Hourly	Chur S-Bahn
941	S 2		Schiers – Landquart – Chur – Reichenau-Tamins – Rhäzüns		Hourly	Chur S-Bahn
950	RE 9 / R 19		St. Moritz – Pontresina – Poschiavo – Tirano		Hourly	
960	R 15		Pontresina – Samedan – Zernez – Sagliains – Scuol-Tarasp		Hourly	

== Rolling stock ==
=== Locomotives ===
==== Steam engines ====
===== Historic vehicles =====
Class and number	Name	Built	Manufacturer	Notes
G 3/4 1	Rhätia	1889	SLM	retired in 1928, later incorporated into the Swiss Transport Museum. then loaned to the Blonay–Chamby museum railway, brought back to RhB in 1988 and restored to working order for the centenary of the G 3/4 class locomotives in 1989
G 3/4 11	Heidi	1911	SLM	retired in 1977 and donated to the Eiger Model Railway Friends in Zweilütschinen for use on heritage services on the Berner Oberland Bahn and Brünigbahn out of service after a damage of the boiler since 1990, returned to RhB in 1999 the restoration by Club 1889 and Dampflokomotiv- und Maschinenfabrik DLM was finished in July 2014
G 4/5 107	Albula	1906	SLM	
G 4/5 108	Engadinia	1906	SLM	

==== Electric locomotives ====
===== In operation =====
There are currently two operational locomotive classes on the RhB: the Ge 4/4^{II} (built 1973–1985) and Ge 4/4^{III} (built 1993–1999) featuring 19 and 12 locos respectively. Two more Ge 4/4III were taken over from MOB in 2019 but not inaugurated yet. Since the introduction of the shuttle train conception with the "Capricorn" EMU's, apart from freight and charter trains only passenger trains of the Chur - Arosa and Chur - St. Moritz and the Glacier Express have remained locomotive hauled.

===== Historic vehicles =====
Class and number	Name	Built	Manufacturer	Notes
Ge 4/4 182		1928	SLM/BBC	1977-1981: Verkehrshaus Luzern 1984-1999: Chemin de Fer de La Mure Operational since 2010
Ge 2/4 222		1913	SLM/BBC	
Ge 4/6 353		1914	SLM/MFO	
Ge 6/6^{I} 414		1929	SLM/BBC/MFO	
Ge 6/6^{I} 415		1929	SLM/BBC/MFO	
Ge 4/4^{I} 602	Bernina	1947	SLM/BBC/MFO	exhibited in Verkehrshaus Luzern on a five-year loan, from March 2012, but returned to RhB at 16, 16 November 2015, out of service since 2022, to be restored in its original condition
Ge 4/4^{I} 605	Silvretta	1953	SLM/BBC/MFO	to be preserved in its last operational condition
Ge 6/6^{II} 702	Curia	1958	SLM/BBC/MFO	exhibited in Verkehrshaus Luzern since March 2023, to be brought back to RhB and restored in original condition
Ge 6/6^{II} 707	Scuol	1965	SLM/BBC/MFO	to be preserved in its last operational condition

=== Railcars and multiple units ===
==== Historic vehicles ====
Class and number	Name	Built	Manufacturer	Notes
ABe 4/4^{I} 30		1911	SIG/Alioth	1953 ex No. 22
ABe 4/4^{I} 34		1908	SIG/Alioth	1947 ex No. 4
ABe 4/4^{II} 46		1965	SWS/SAAS/BBC	
ABe 4/4^{III} 54	Hakone	1990	SLM/ABB	
ABe 4/4^{III} 501		1939	BBC/MFO/SWS	

=== Passenger cars ===
As of January 2026 the passenger car fleet consists the following vehicles, not including the subsequent special vehicles:

- 13 first class carriages
- 11 first/second class carriages
- 53 second class carriages
- 6 second class carriages with luggage compartment
- 7 luggage vans
- 20 driving cab car

==== Panoramic trains ====
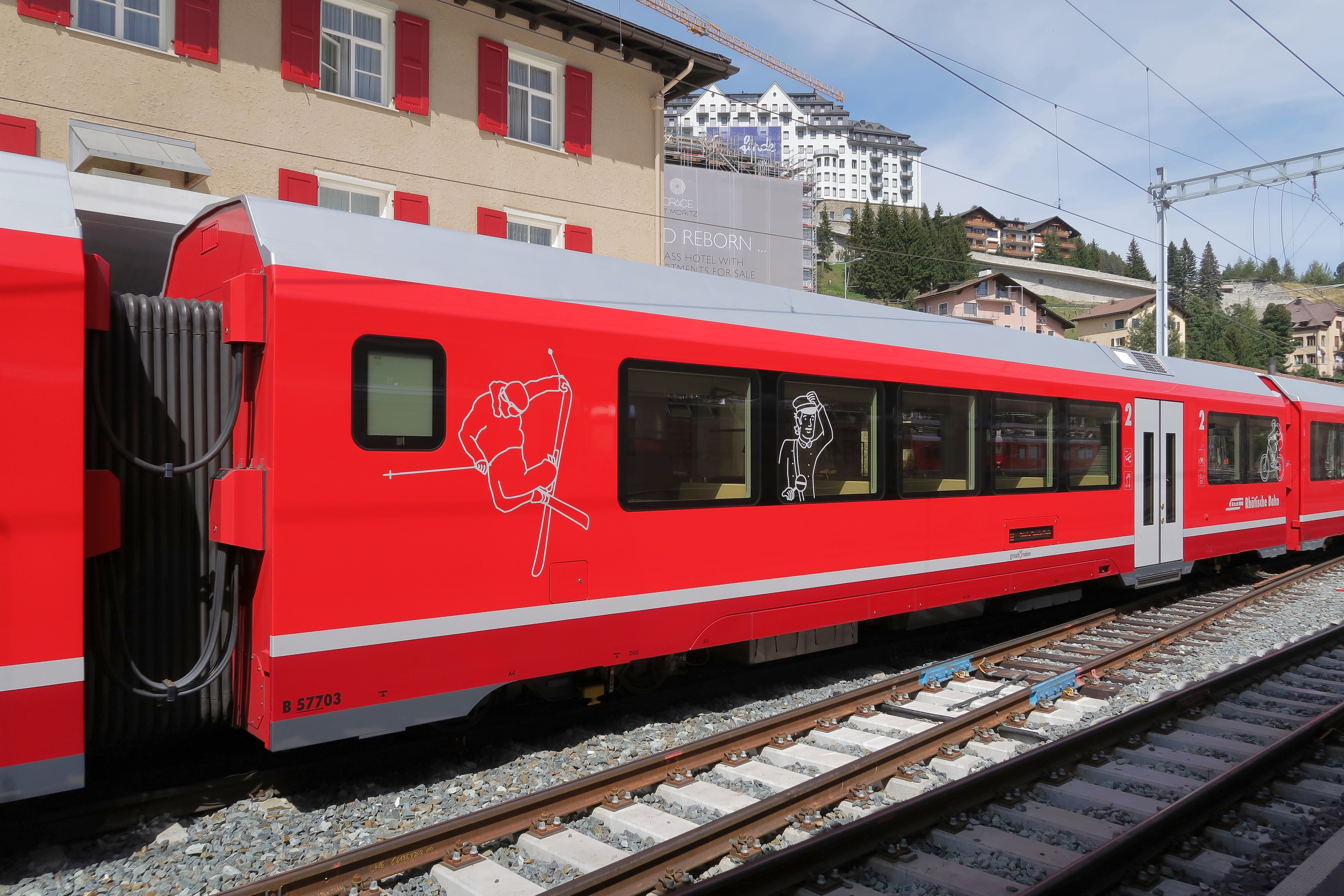
Intermediate car of an ALVRA trainset

==== Dining cars and Pullman carriages ====
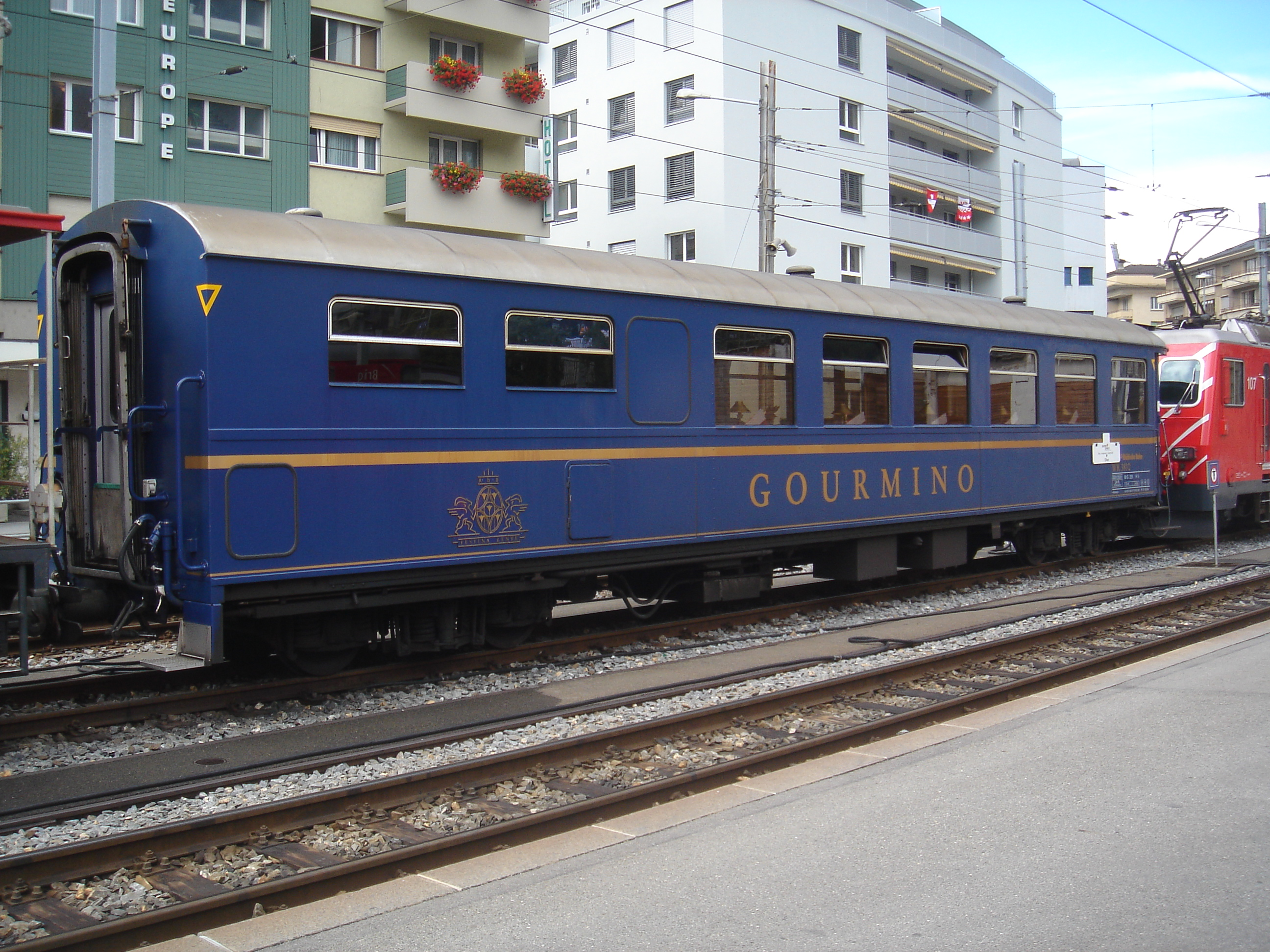
Dining car WR 3810

The first dining cars were built in 1929 - three for Glacier Express, and two for Bernina Express, where the latter had no kitchen due to custom issues, and a two-axle kitchen car was attached - however in 1944 they were fitted with kitchen. All these vehicles belonged to the German Mitropa company, and were bought only after the end of World War II by RhB. Since then they had the numbers WR 3810-3812 and WR 3813-3814 respectively. While the former Bernina dining cars were taken out of service in 1987, the WR 3810-3812 have got modernized kitchen and a refurbished original interior. In 1984 a new dining car WR 3815 has entered service, followed three years later by the twin dining car 3816+3817, which had a capacity of 60 seats.

From the 90es the dining cars were branded as "Gourmino" and got a blue livery, later modified to the shade of the Pullman carriages. To keep up with demands for modern and historic dining cars, in 1994 the WR 3822 and in 2002 the WR 3813 (II) were rebuilt from first class carriages. As this demand has started to decrease again, WR 3816+3817 were sold in 2015 to the French museum railway Chemin de fer de la baie de Somme, which has also taken over WR 3822 in 2018. As of 2026 the dining cars are used in regular trains between Chur and St. Moritz, but also in charter trains and for dinner trips.

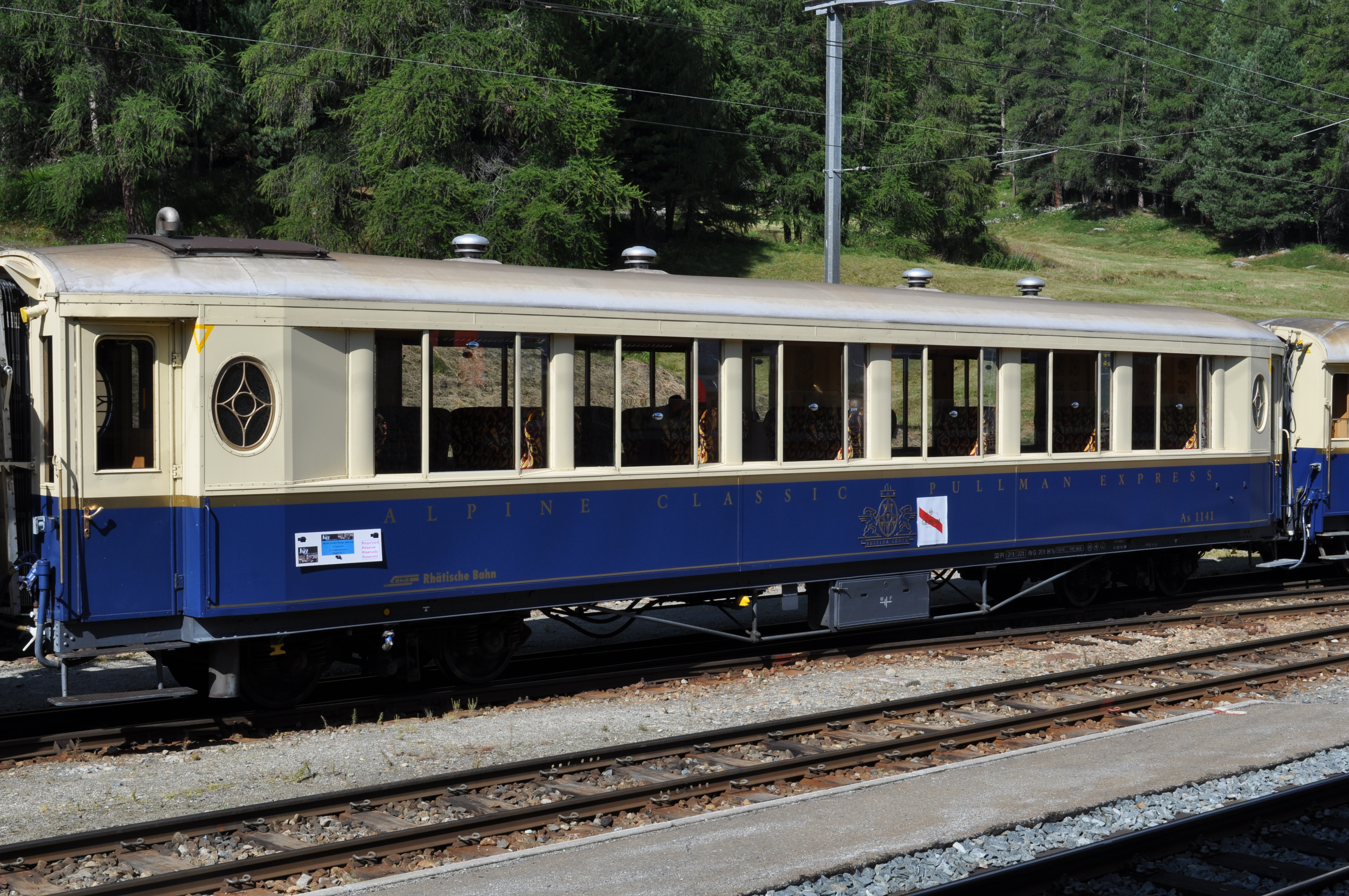
Pullman car As 1141

In 1929 the first Pullman car No. 61 was introduced, which has provided together with the one year younger first class compartment car No. 54 a higher lever service in the long-distance express trains. In 1939 four more Pullman cars No. 241-244 (ex 103–106) were taken over from the MOB, where they used to serve in CIWL's Golden Mountain Pullman Express. All these vehicles were renumbered into As 1161, 1154 and 1141-1144 respectively. While As 1161 were rebuilt as a measure car in 1973, all the others were renovated and used in charter trains and as additional first class service as well. After a refurbishment in 1985 the As 1161 has also returned as a passenger car.

Due to their deteriorating substance a withdrawal of the Pullman cars were foreseen in the 90es, but a new-founded association "Verein Pro Salonwagen" led by Alby Glatt, the founder of Nostalgie-Istanbul-Orient-Express acted for their preservation, and collected all the necessary money for their renovation. Since 1999 the first carriages were running with a blue and cream livery, featuring the new brand "Alpine Classic Pullman Express" (abbreviated as ACPE). Carriages As 1141 and 1142 were refurbished to be also operated on the Bernina line. The train was completed by the two-axle luggage van D 4062 and in 2001 by car As 1161 while As 1154 went to Deutsches Museum in Munich on long-term loan. In 2010 the former dining car WR 3814, which was 1999 rebuilt in its original appearance without a kitchen, was refitted as a bar car and renumbered as WR-S 3820.

The ACPE used to run several times a year from St. Moritz to Zermatt as Alpine Classic Glacier Express and return, featuring a two-day trip including sightseeing, however in the recent times these journeys were discontinued. A recurring event is the Advent trip of the association, featuring every Pullman and dining cars in one train.

==== Historic and thematic coaches ====
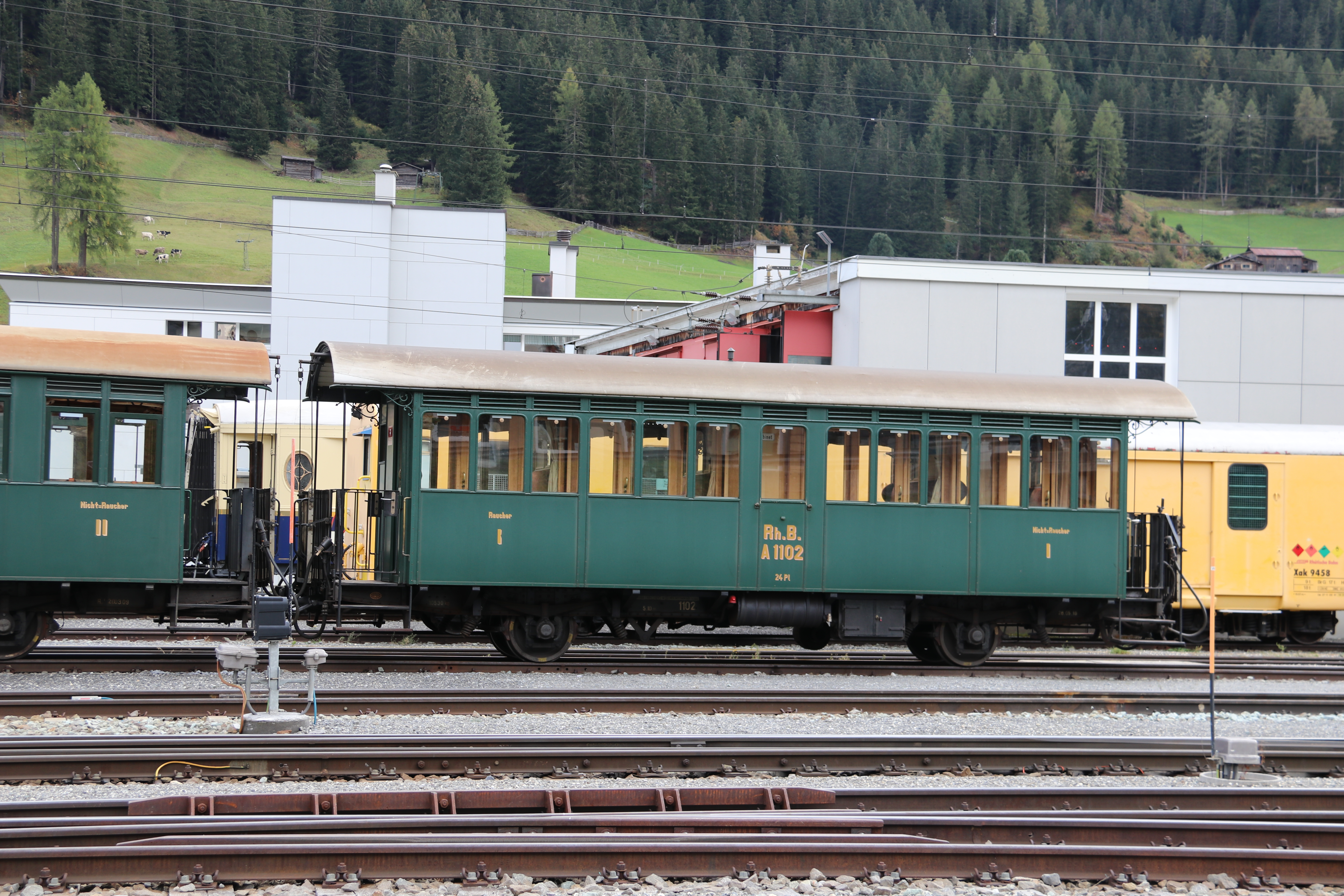
Historic first-class carriage A 1102

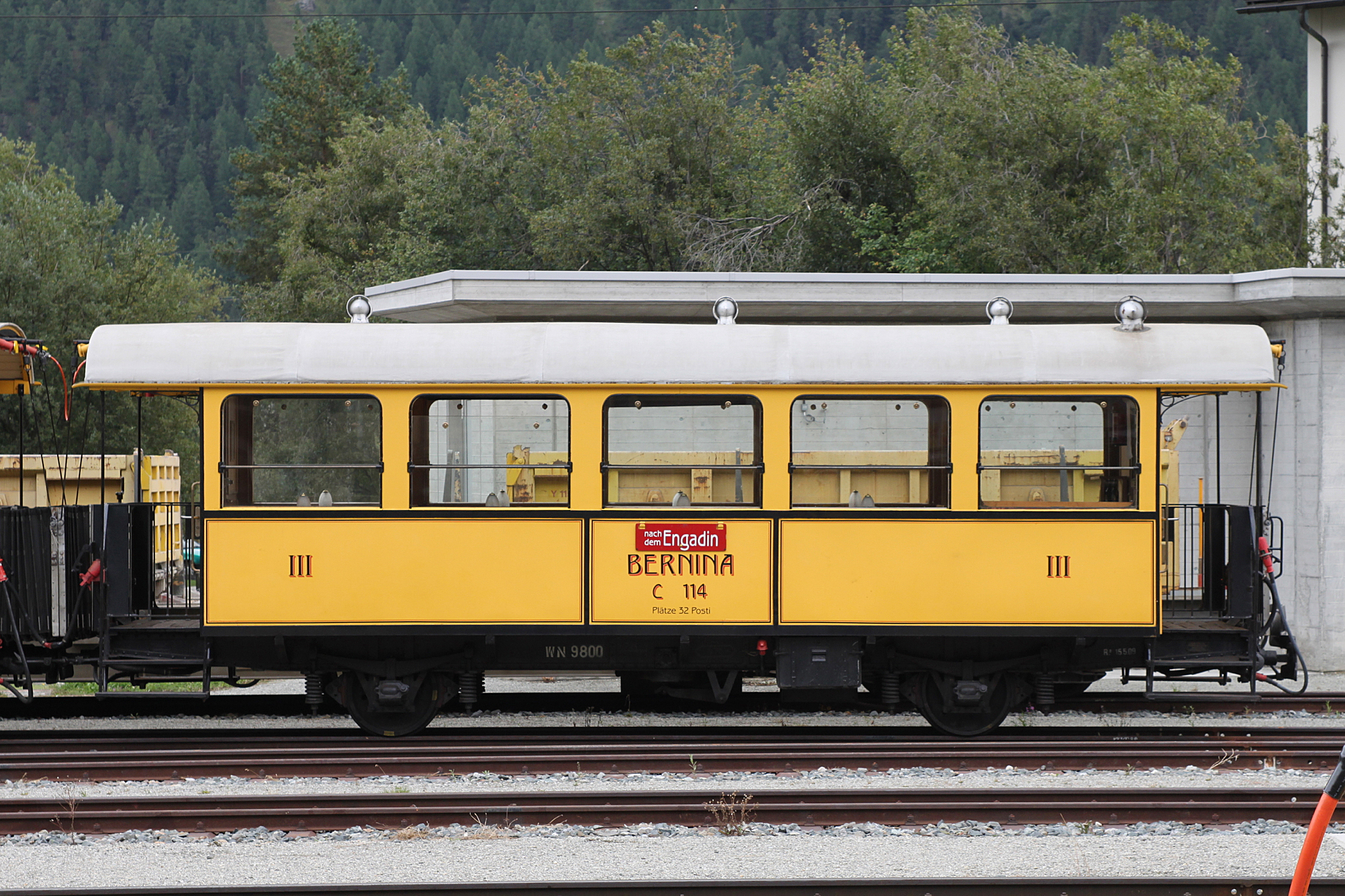
Bernina railway's C 114 carriage, restored as "La Bucunada" buffet car

Nine two-axle carriages are renovated for historic trains, and can be used on the entire network, including the Bernina line. The oldest one is the third-class car C 32 from 1889, followed by the luggage van F 4 (built 1896) and a similar third-class carriage C 66 (built 1897), together also meant as "Gründerzug" (founder's train). Another rarity is the first-class car A 1102 with compartments. Two vehicles used to run on the Bernina railway, and have got back the matching yellow livery at the refurbishment. One of them, the second/third class car BC 110 have rattan seats in the second class section. Some of these vehicles don't have the original interior, but fitted as buffet cars. For the steam trains three four-axle cars (built 1928–1932) with open plattforms are also preserved.

Two matching trailer cars to the ABe 501 motor car - but also operational in loco-hauled trains - with doors in the middle are also preserved. Due to the changes in the rolling stock the passenger cars of the 1960s and 1970s are slowly becoming historic as well - as the first representative of this era the luggage van D 4205 has already been refurbished, and the first class car A 1225 is currently under renovation.

The "Stiva Retica" buffet car (WR-S 3821) was rebuilt 1993 from the first class carriage A 1211, its interior features the ambient of the restaurants of the region ("Bündnerstube") with a bar, wooden chairs and also wood-covered walls and ceiling. It's used for charter trips, also coupled to scheduled trains.

Between 1981 and 1990 twelve two-axle open coaches were rebuilt from older carriages. Having no windows and roofs - only a scaffold to protect passengers from broken catenary - they became popular in regular and historic trains either. An additional four-axle open carriage already with roof was refitted in 2000. These vehicles should be replaced mid-term by new ones.

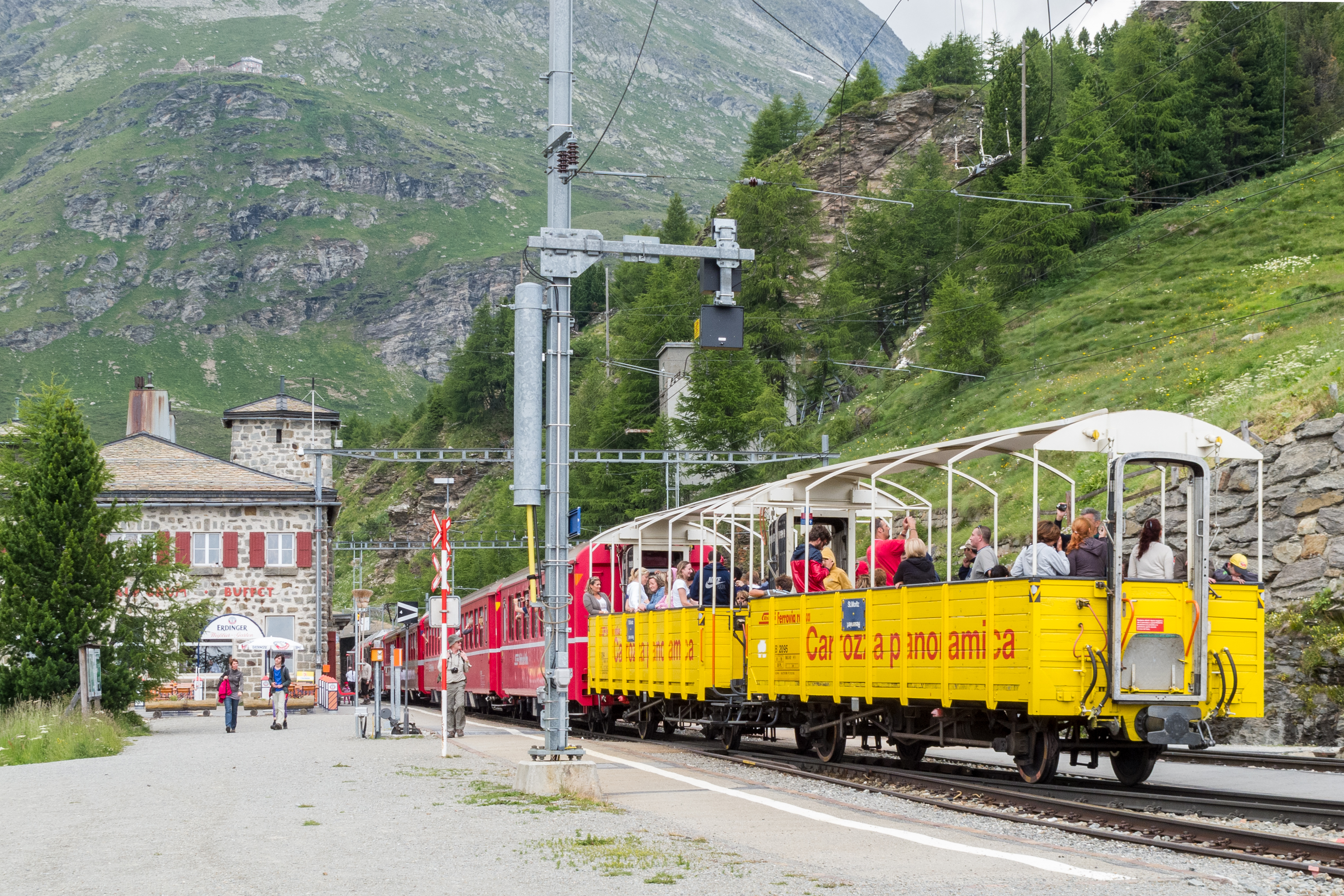
Open coaches at Alp Grüm

== Corporate information ==
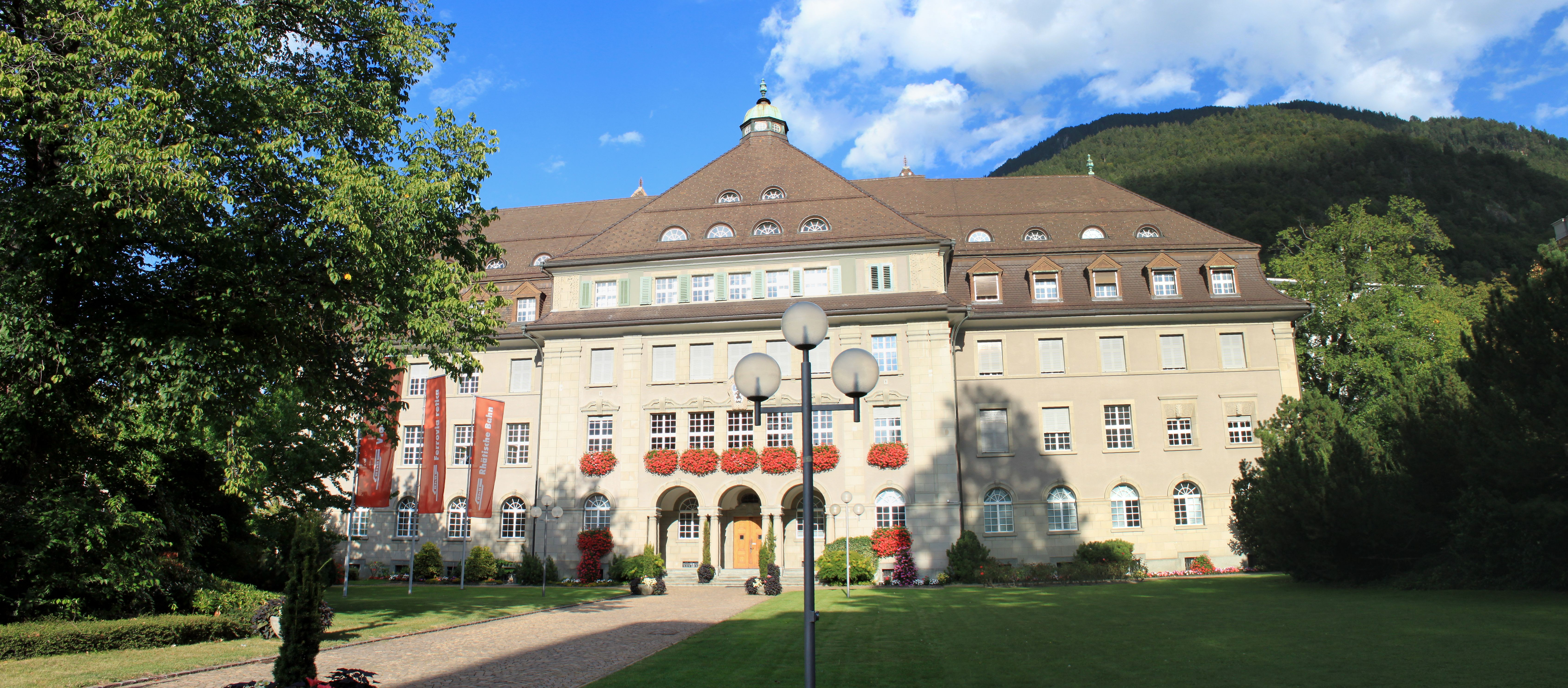
The RhB's headquarters, 2011.

=== Statistics ===
- Travellers per year (2008): 10.7 million
- Revenue (2008): 308,700,000 sFr.
- Profit (2008): 1,700,000 sFr.
- Employees (2008): 1,348
- Total rolling stock (2008): 1,294

=== Ownership ===
The RhB is 51.3% owned by the Cantonal government of Graubünden, 43.1% by the Swiss Confederation, 4.6% by private shareholders and 1% by a collection of local communities.

The RhB has its headquarters at Bahnhofstrasse 25, Chur.

== Accidents and incidents ==
- On 13 August 2014, a passenger train was struck by a landslide and derailed at Tiefencastel, Graubünden, on the Albula Railway. Eleven people were injured.

== In popular culture ==
In 1997, the Rhaetian Railway was used as the prototype for the Nord Express in the 20th Century Fox animated motion picture Anastasia. Not only was the Rhaetian Railway featured in the film, but several landmarks were also included: the Landwasser Viaduct and a 1912 Mittelthurgau-Bahn Ec 3/5 Class 2-6-2 tank locomotive No. 3 with an added tender. This 1912 locomotive was portrayed as a Russian continental steam locomotive (fictional). It was modified with the smoke deflectors and the smoke-box door from a Danish State Railways Class R 963. The locomotive's fictitious number being used in the movie was 2747, as this was a reference to the address of the Fox Animation Studios on East Camelback Road in Phoenix, Arizona. The Landwasser Viaduct was portrayed as a tall, 4-storey viaduct in Poland as a type of Roman aqueducts.

== See also ==
- Bernina Express
- Hakone Tozan Line (Odakyu Hakone): Japanese private mountain railway, twinning railway with RhB.
- List of mountain railways in Switzerland
- List of heritage railways and funiculars in Switzerland
- List of narrow-gauge railways in Switzerland
- List of railway companies in Switzerland
- Rail transport in Switzerland

== Bibliography ==
- Camenisch, Carl (1904). Die Rhätische Bahn: mit besonderer Berücksichtigung der Albula-Route [The Rhaetian Railway with particular attention to the Albula route]. Zürich: Orell Füssli Verlag.
- Hill, Ken; Pattison, Tony, eds. (2000). Jane's World Railways. London: Jane's Information Group. ISBN 0-7106-2034-9.
- Marshall, John (1974). Metre Gauge Railways in South and East Switzerland. Newton Abbot: David & Charles. ISBN 0-7153-6408-1.
