= Bernina Express =

Train between Switzerland and Italy

Coordinates: 46°24′32″N 10°1′11″E

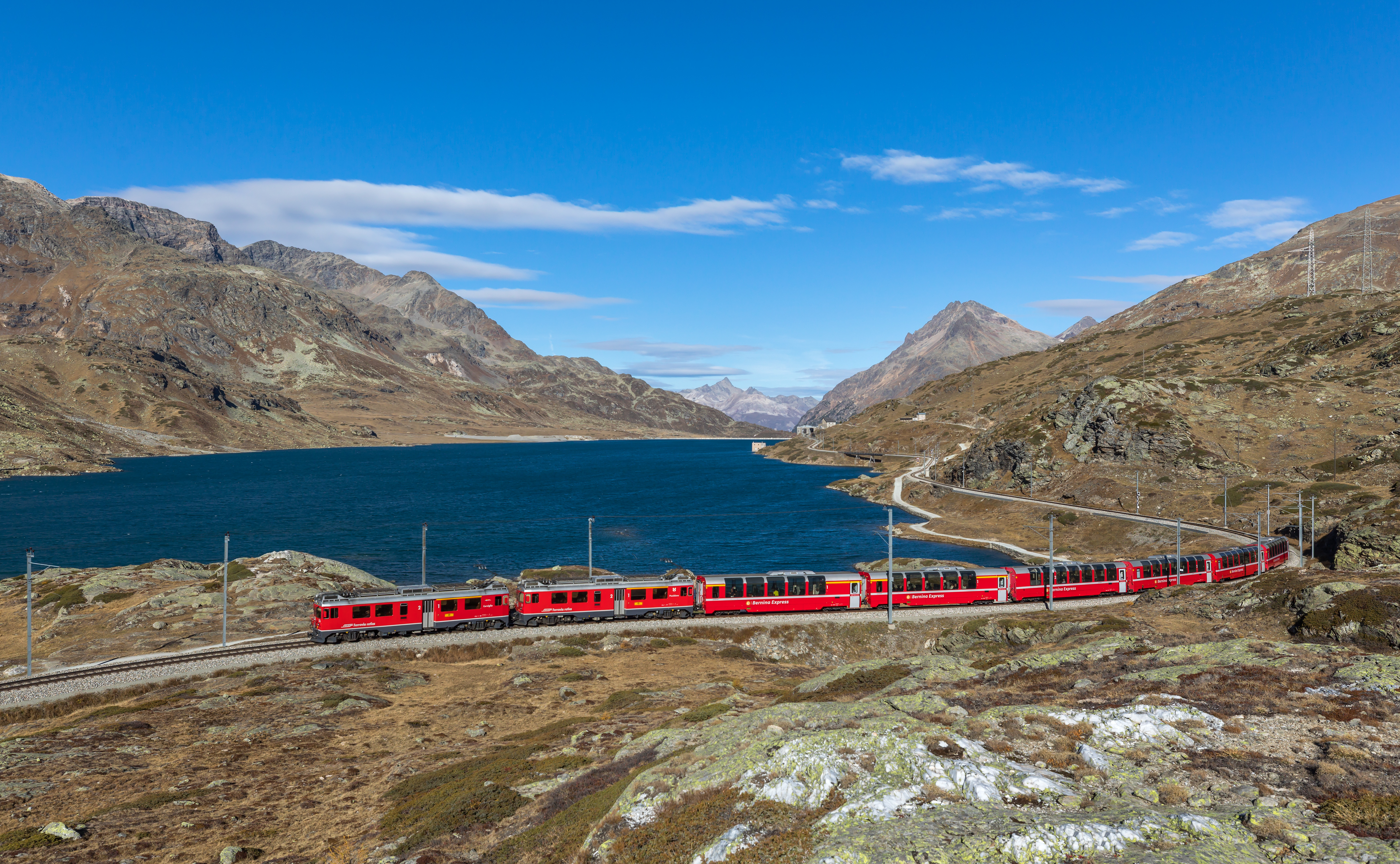
- Bernina Express on the Bernina line, passing Lago Bianco with Ospizio Bernina railway station in the background

Overview
- Service type: Panorama Express
- Status: Operating
- Locale: Graubünden, Switzerland; Sondrio, Italy
- Current operator: Rhaetian Railway
- Former operator: Bernina-Bahngesellschaft
- Website: RhB website (in English)

Route
- Termini: Chur / St Moritz; Tirano
- Distance travelled: Varies
- Average journey time: 4 hours
- Service frequency: Daily

On-board services
- Classes: 1st and 2nd
- Disabled access: Yes
- Catering facilities: Minibar
- Observation facilities: Panorama cars

Technical
- Rolling stock: Panorama cars
- Track gauge: 1,000 mm (3 ft 3 3/8 in) metre gauge
- Electrification: 11 kV AC 16 2/3 Hz (core network); 1,000 V DC (Bernina line)

The Bernina Express is a named train in Switzerland running as a Panorama Express (PE) that connects Chur (Switzerland) and Tirano (Italy) by crossing the Swiss Engadin Alps. For most of its journey, the train also runs along the World Heritage Site known as the Rhaetian Railway in the Albula / Bernina landscapes.

The train is operated by the Rhaetian Railway company for the purpose of sightseeing. It takes the form of an enhanced regional service between Tirano and Chur: panoramic coaches with enlarged windows and multi-lingual (English, Chinese, French, German, Italian, and Japanese) audio guide on board. It is not an "express" in the sense of being a high-speed train, but rather an express train that stops only at selected stations. The trainset is usually pulled by class RhB ABe 4/4^{III} locomotives.

Passengers must make a seat reservation either directly when they purchase Bernina Express tickets, or pay a small supplement on top of their regional train tickets. The Bernina Express is popular with tourists. It connects in Tirano with a bus service via Lake Como in Italy to Lugano in Switzerland, with connections to the Gotthard Panorama Express, another tourist train.

The Albula line and the Bernina line on the Bernina Express route were jointly declared a World Heritage Site in 2008. The trip on the Bernina Express through this World Heritage Site is a four-hour railway journey across 196 bridges, through 55 tunnels and across the Bernina Pass at 2,253 metres (7,392 ft) above sea level. The entire line is 1,000 mm (3 ft 3 3/8 in) (metre gauge) and electrified.

The Albula line was constructed between 1898 and 1904; it has been operated by the Rhaetian Railway since its inauguration. The Bernina line was built in 1908–1910 and operated independently until the 1940s, when it was acquired by the Rhaetian Railway. The Bernina Express uses gradients of 7% to negotiate the difference in height of about 1,800 m (5,900 ft) from the summit at Ospizio Bernina to Tirano.

== Itinerary ==
=== Albula line ===
The train leaves the city of Chur (585 m [1,919 ft]) in Graubünden and follows the course of the Rhine to Bonaduz (655 m [2,149 ft]). From there it enters the Domleschg Valley and follows the Posterior Rhine from Rhäzüns (658 m [2,159 ft]) to Thusis (697 m [2,287 ft]). The train continues toward Tiefencastel (851 m [2,792 ft]) following the Albula and then crosses the Landwasser Viaduct before arriving at Filisur (1,032 m [3,386 ft]). Shortly after Filisur the train passes its first spiral tunnel and continues to Bergün/Bravuogn. Between Bergün/Bravuogn (1,373 m [4,505 ft]) and Preda (1,789 m [5,869 ft]), at the end of the valley, the train has to achieve a difference in height of about 400 m (1,300 ft) with an horizontal distance of 5 km (3.1 mi) without using rack-and-pinion, but with many spirals. Then the train enters the Albula Tunnel at 1,815 m (5,955 ft) under the Albula Pass. It emerges in the Val Bever, where it reaches Bever (1,708 m [5,604 ft]) on the Engadin plain. The train continues toward Samedan (1,721 m [5,646 ft]) and arrives at the Pontresina station (1,774 m [5,820 ft]) in the Val Bernina (Bernina Valley).

=== Bernina line ===
The train leaves Pontresina and ascends progressively through the valley to the Bernina Pass over the Morteratsch station (1,896 m [6,220 ft]), where the glacier and the highest summit of the Eastern Alps, Piz Bernina (4,093 m [13,428 ft]) are visible. Before arriving at the Bernina Pass, the train stops at Bernina Diavolezza (2,093 m [6,867 ft]) for cable-car connections to Diavolezza (2,921 m [9,583 ft]). The Bernina Express reaches the summit at the Ospizio Bernina station at 2,253 m (7,392 ft) above Lago Bianco.

Alp Grüm (2,091 m [6,860 ft]) is the first station south of the Alps, situated above Lago Palü and right below Piz Palü (3,900 m [12,800 ft]+) and its glacier. After many hairpin turns the train reaches Cavaglia (1,693 m [5,554 ft]) above the Val Poschiavo, then the Swiss Italian-speaking town of Poschiavo (1,014 m [3,327 ft]). The train then follows the course of the Poschiavino and stops at Le Prese (964 m [3,163 ft]) and Miralago (965 m [3,166 ft]), both on Lake Poschiavo's shore. After Miralago it continues its descent toward Brusio (780 m [2,560 ft]), where it passes the spiral Brusio Viaduct. Shortly after the Italian border at Campocologno (553 m [1,814 ft]), the Bernina Express ends its journey at Tirano station (430 m [1,410 ft]).

=== Route ===
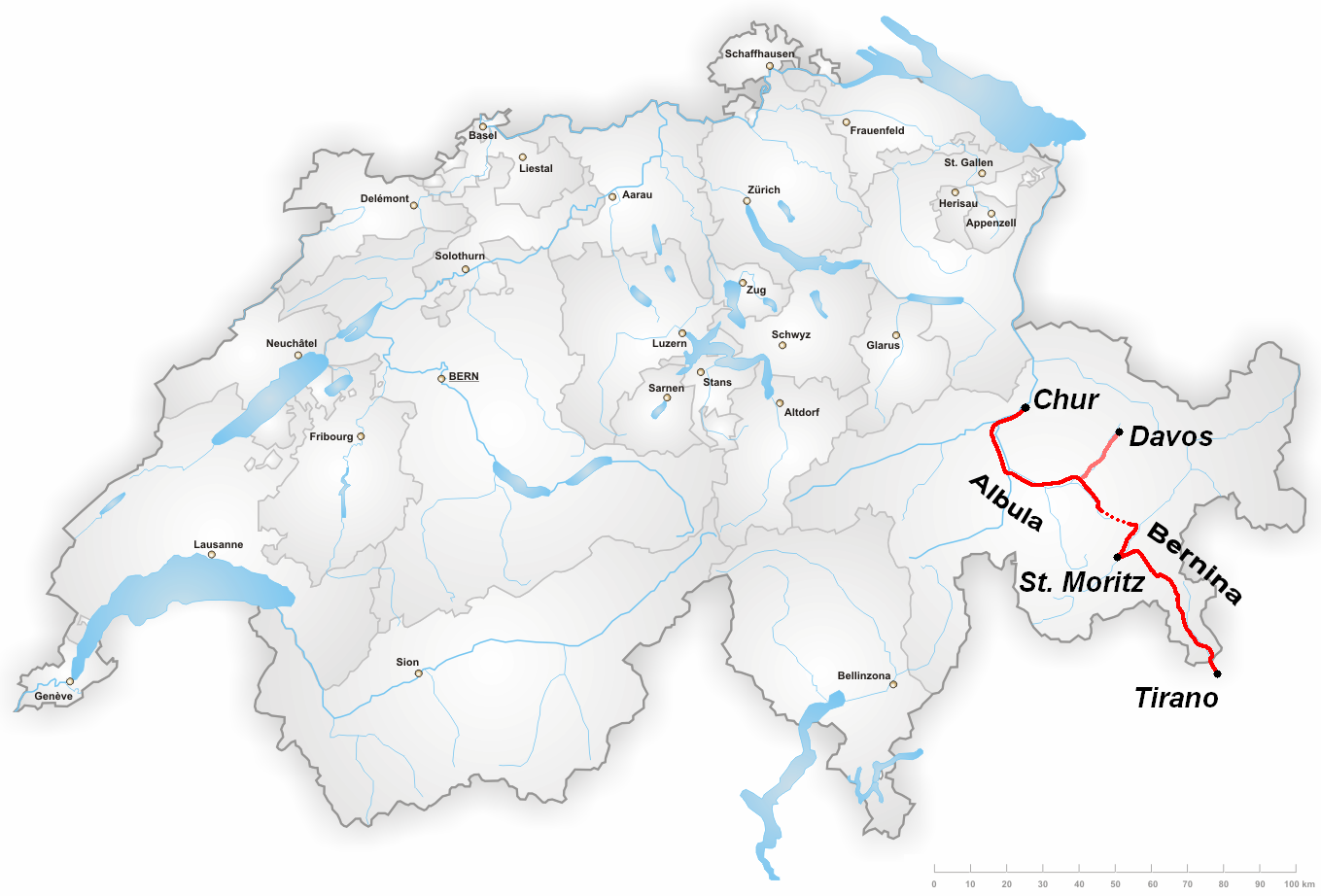
Route

During the summer, the Bernina Express comprises a special separate train that travels from Chur to Pontresina with very few stops. In Pontresina, the locomotive is changed (because of the Bernina line's different electricity current) and the train continues with few stops to Tirano.

During autumn, winter and spring, the Bernina Express comprises several cars that are attached to regional services. From Chur to Samedan, they are part of a RegioExpress (RE) train Chur – St. Moritz; from Samedan to Pontresina, they are part of a Regio (R) train Scuol-Tarasp – Pontresina; from Pontresina to Tirano, they are part of a Regio train from St. Moritz – Tirano. Each of these Bernina Express trains includes designated carriages for passengers with only regional train tickets.

There is a bus transfer between Tirano and Lugano (Swiss canton of Ticino), which links the Bernina Express with the Gotthard Panorama Express. At St. Moritz, it connects with the Glacier Express, another tourist train.

== See also ==
- Glacier Express
- GoldenPass Express
- Rail transport in Switzerland
- Voralpen Express
