= La Rösa =

Hamlet in Graubünden, Switzerland

- hamlet
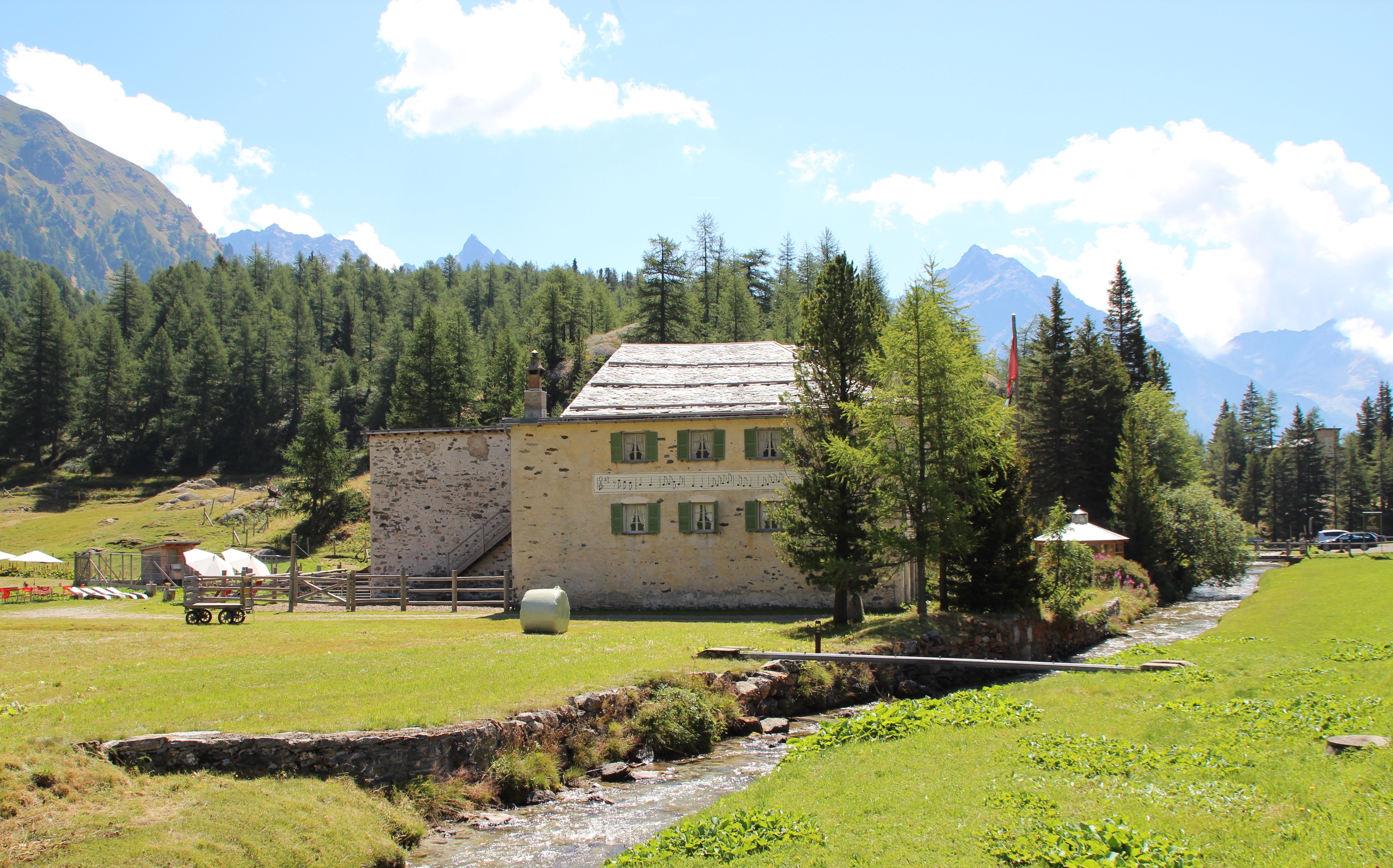

- Coordinates: 46°24′04″N 10°04′01″E
- Country: Switzerland

La Rösa is a hamlet in the upper part of the Val Poschiavo in the canton of Graubünden, Switzerland. It lies at 1,880 metres (6,170 ft) above sea level on the southern approach to the Bernina Pass, and is in the municipality of Poschiavo, some 9 kilometres (5.6 mi) north of the village of the same name. Because of the 860 metres (2,820 ft) elevation difference between the two villages, the distance between them by road is 12 kilometres (7.5 mi). The upper reaches of the Poschiavino river flow through the hamlet.

La Rösa occupies a narrow shelf on the southern slope of the Bernina watershed, just above the tree line. The hamlet straddles the canton road H29, which climbs from Poschiavo to the 2,328 m Bernina Pass with gradients of up to 10 %. A small bridge at the north end carries the road over the young Poschiavino; at this point the stream's mean discharge is only about 0.4 cubic metres per second, but peak snow-melt floods can fill the channel bank-to-bank in June.

== Historical role ==
La Rösa was a post and mule station built in the 17th century as a stopover point for transport on the heavily frequented north–south crossing of the Alps over the Bernina Pass. Documents from 1645 already mention a "posta di La Rösa" where muleteers could change animals before tackling the pass. The complex—inn, stables, smithy and customs office—expanded in 1777 when the Three Leagues government required all south-bound mail to be routed over the Bernina rather than the Septimer. After the 1910 opening of the Bernina Railway, on a route that bypasses La Rösa, the mule system fell into disuse, and the postal station was converted into the Hospizio La Rösa hotel in 1923. The exterior and panelled common room of the hotel are listed as cultural property of regional significance. Hauptstrasse 29, the modern replacement for the old mule road, still passes by La Rösa.

== Transport and present use ==
La Rösa is still a scheduled stop on PostAuto route 701, which links Le Prese and Samedan six times daily and provides connections with the Bernina Express at Ospizio Bernina. A 7 km snow-cleared hiking trail follows the old cart track up to Ospizio Bernina, making the hamlet a popular starting point for winter snow-shoe tours, while in summer the hotel operates as an information hub for the Val Poschiavo section of the Via Albula/Bernina long-distance path.
