= Lago Bianco =

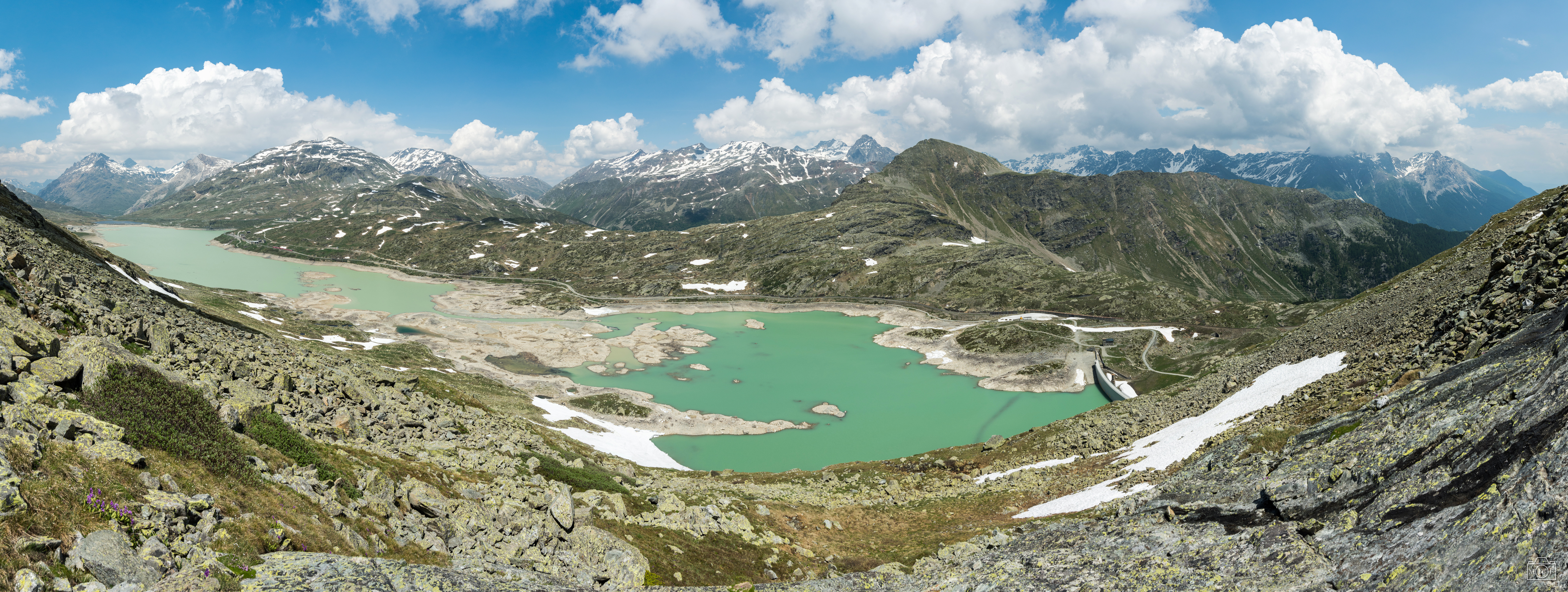
- Low water levels in 2015 reveal the outline of the two precursor lakes

- Location within Canton of Graubünden Location within Switzerland Location within Italy Location within Alps
- Interactive map of Lago Bianco
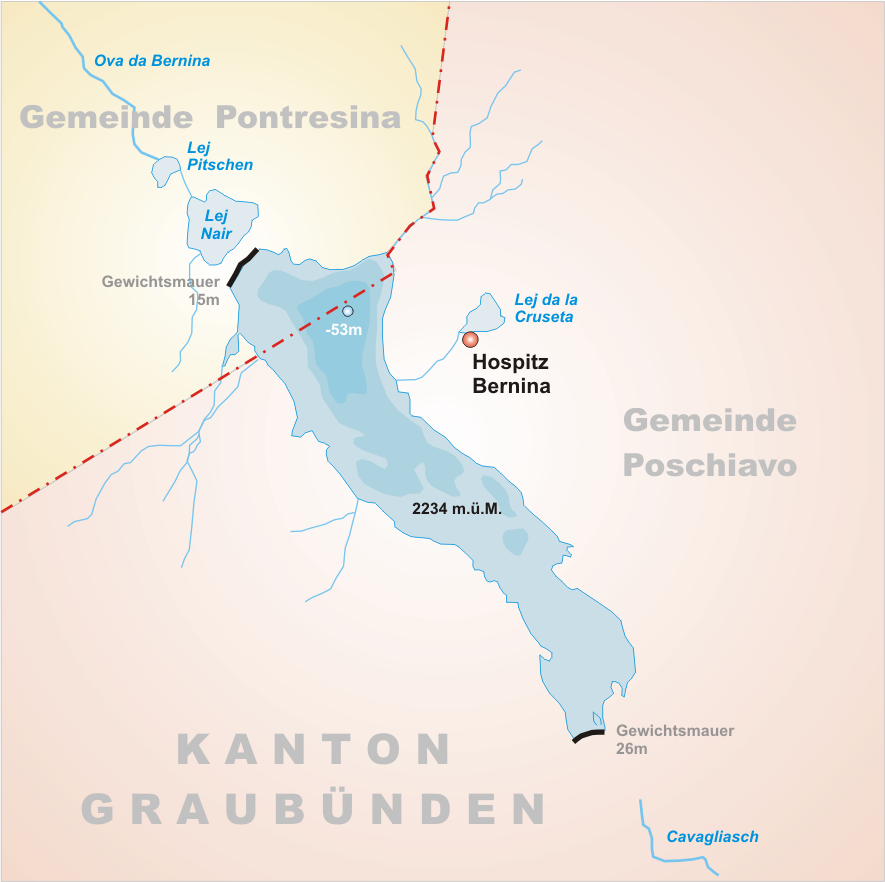
- map
- Location: Grisons
- Coordinates: 46°24′11″N 10°1′18″E
- Type: reservoir
- Primary inflows: various creeks
- Primary outflows: Cavagliasch
- Basin countries: Switzerland
- Surface area: 1.50 km^{2} (0.58 sq mi)
- Max. depth: 53 m (174 ft)
- Water volume: 18.6 million cubic metres (15,100 acre⋅ft)
- Surface elevation: 2,234 m (7,329 ft)

Lago Bianco (literally "White Lake" in Italian) is a reservoir at the Bernina Pass in the Swiss canton of Graubünden.

== Geography ==
It has an elevation of 2,234 m (7,329 ft), a length of 2.85 km (1.77 mi), a surface area of 1.50 km^{2} (0.58 sq mi) and a maximum depth of 53 m (174 ft). Once the site of two smaller lakes (Lago Bianco and Lago della Scala), the current reservoir was formed in the early 20th century by the constructions of two dams (Scala and Arlas) at its southern and northern ends. The current lake drains to the south, as did both its precursor lakes, with its water eventually reaching the Mediterranean via the rivers Poschiavino, Adda and Po. By contrast, Lej Nair, just below the northern dam, drains north into the Black Sea via the rivers Inn and Danube.

The summit of the Bernina railway line, which is the highest mountain crossing railway in Europe, runs alongside the eastern side of the lake, with the Ospizio Bernina station at roughly the mid-point. The road across the Bernina pass (Hauptstrasse 29) follows a higher route on the same side of the lake. Most of the lake lies within the municipality of Poschiavo, although the most northerly section and the northern dam lie within the municipality of Pontresina.

The Lago Bianco reservoir was created between 1910 and 1911 in order to provide a constant supply of water to a series of hydro-electric power plants in the Val Poschiavo. It has a maximum volume of 18.6 million cubic metres (15,100 acre⋅ft). Initially water was discharged into natural watercourses as far as a power station intake at Cavaglia that fed the Robbia power station at San Carlo. However, in 1927 two power stations were built between the lake and Cavaglia. The highest of these, the Palü power station at Lago Palü, is now fed by a pipeline from the southern end of the reservoir.

There are current proposals to construct a pumped storage scheme based on Lago Bianco and the Lago di Poschiavo some 1,270 metres (4,170 ft) below. This would involve creating a 18.1 kilometres (11.2 mi) long tunnel high along the western side of the Val di Poschiavo, followed by 2.4 kilometres (1.5 mi) long shaft to an underground power plant on the banks of the Lago di Poschiavo. This would have a total installed capacity of 1000 MW and would consume electricity to pump water to the higher level at times of low demand and release water to generate electricity in times of high demand. The scheme would involve raising the dams at either end of Lago Bianco by 4.35 metres (14.3 ft). The proposals have received formal consent from the cantonal authorities, but as of 2016 are not believed to be financially viable.

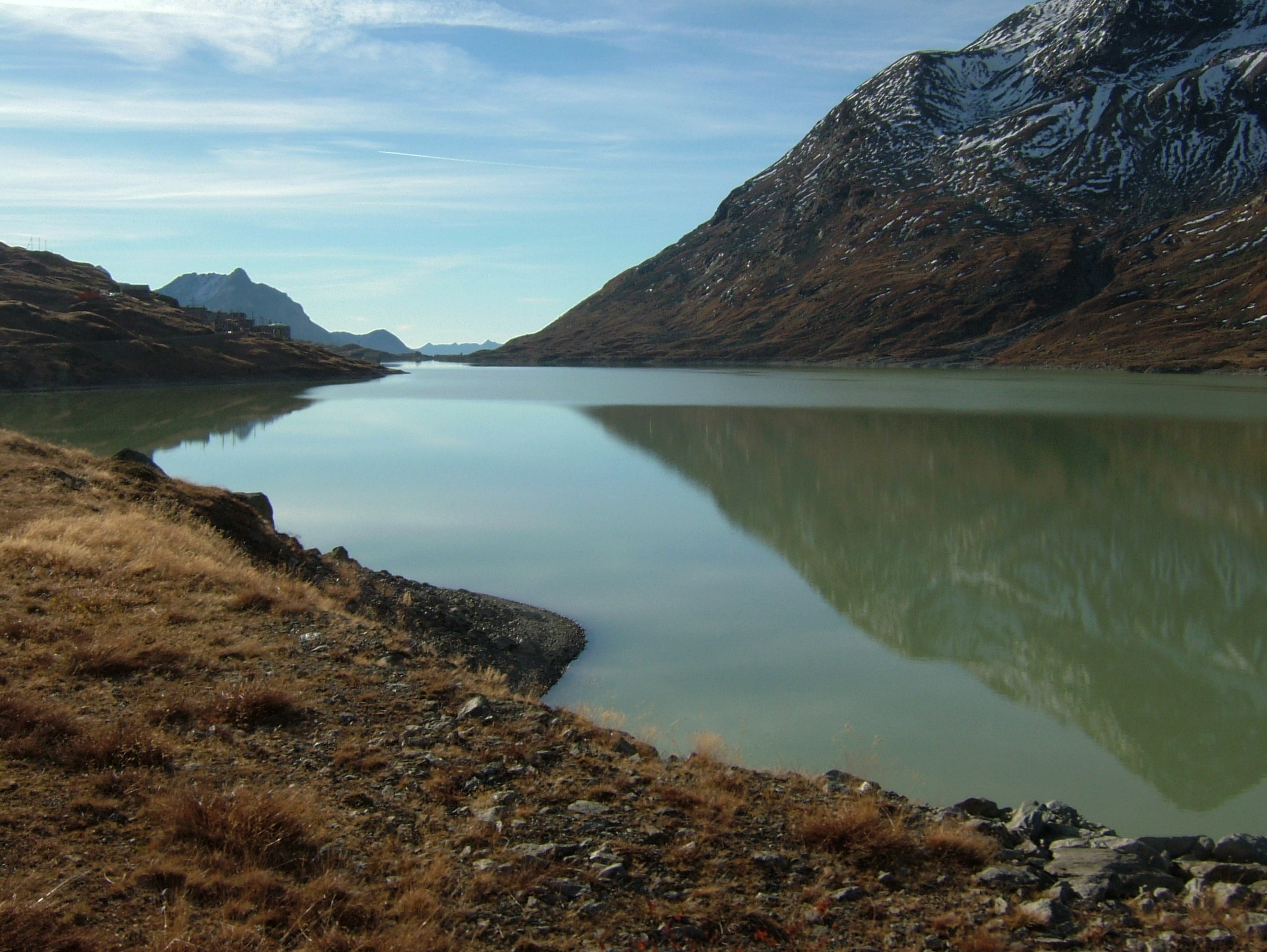
The shoreline of the lake

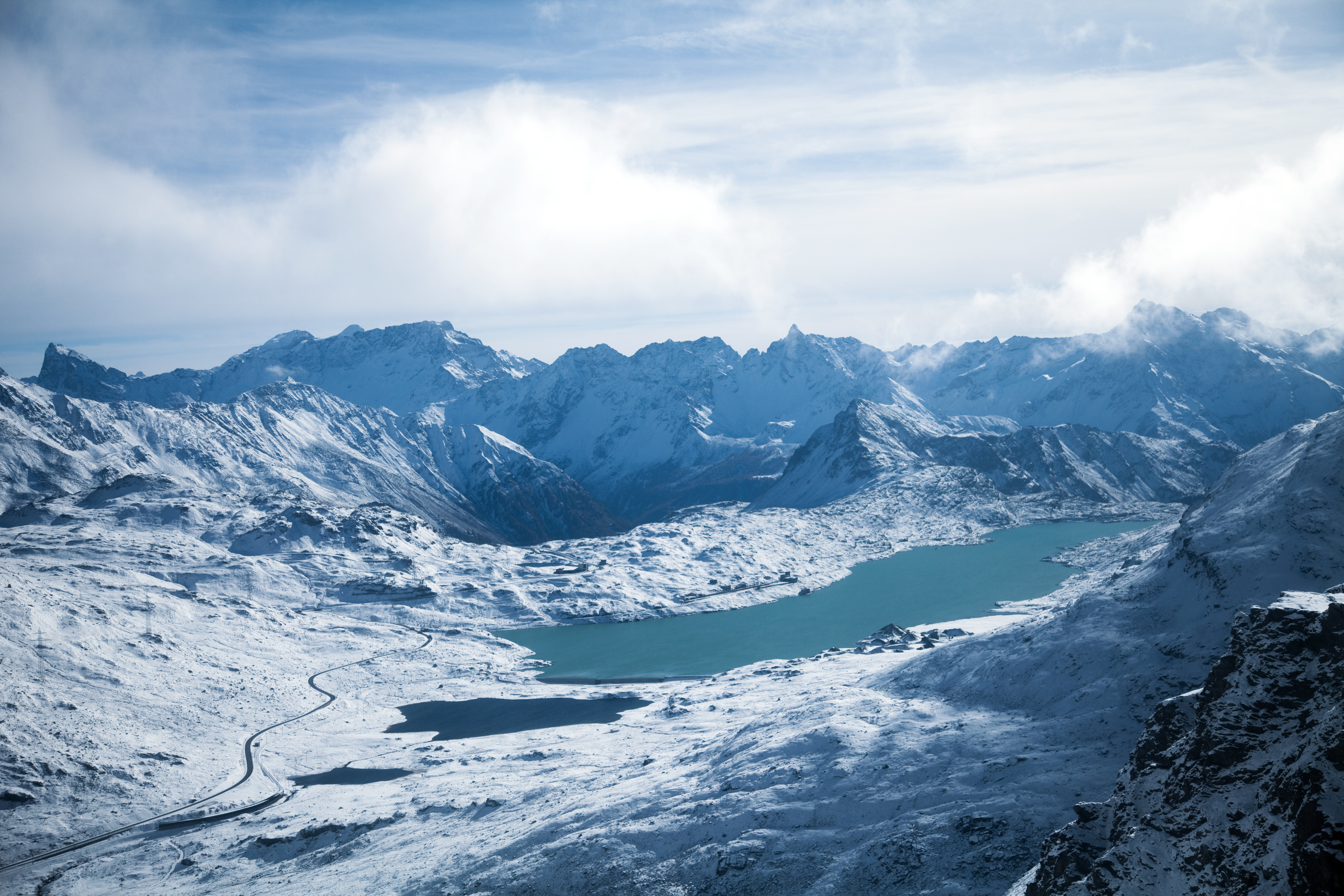
View of Lago Bianco from the Diavolezza cable car

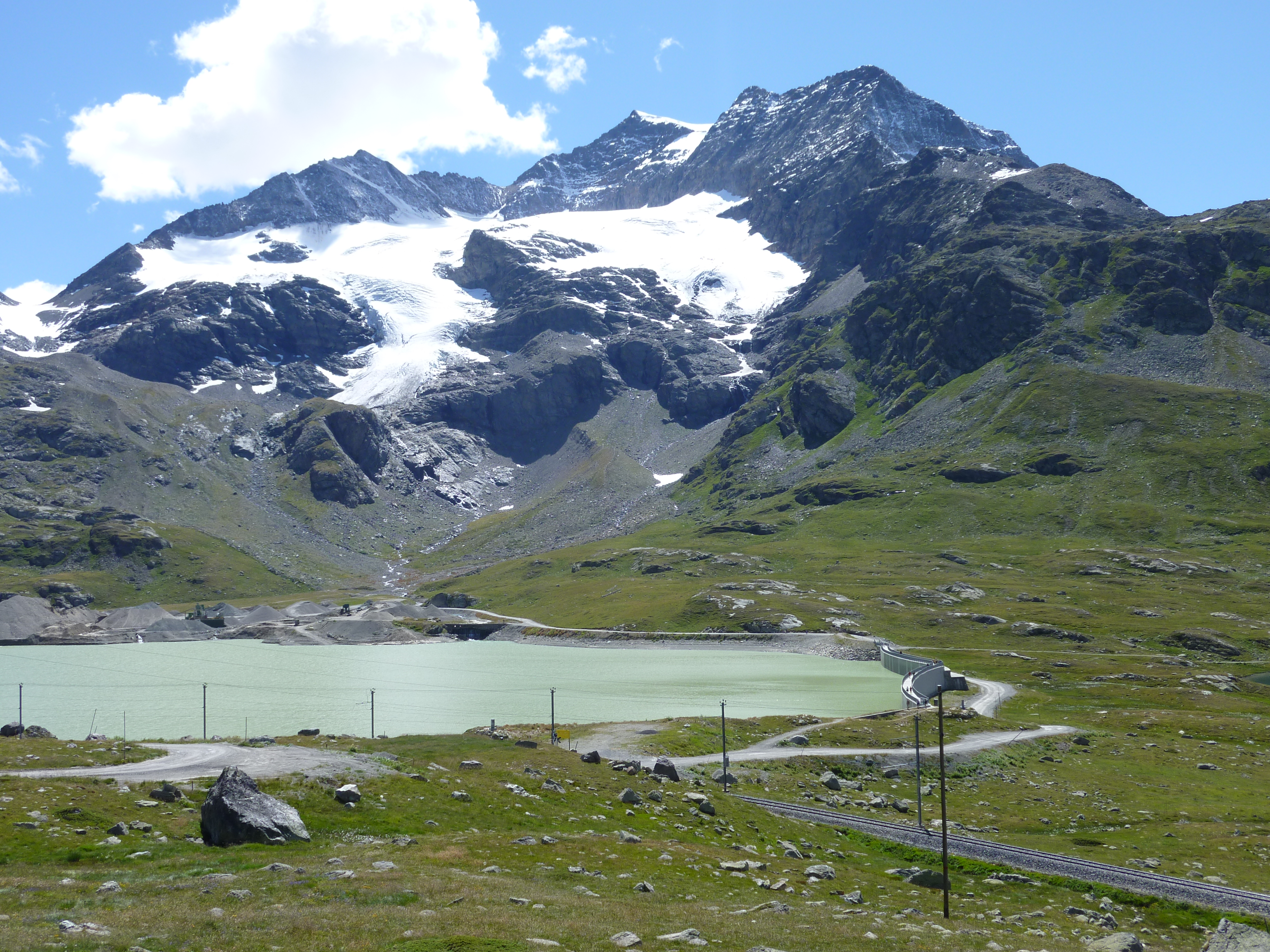
North (Arlas) dam

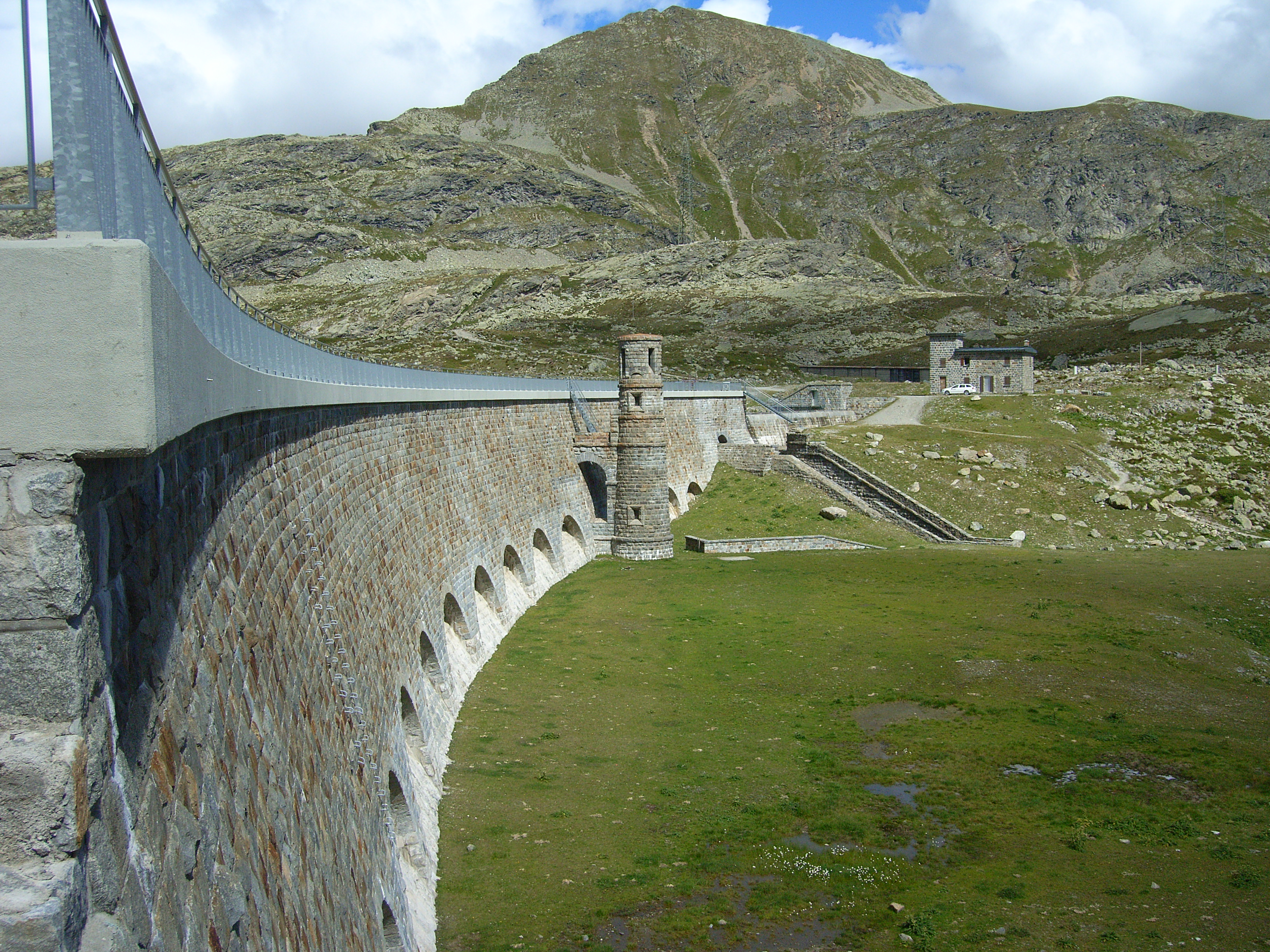
South (Scala) dam

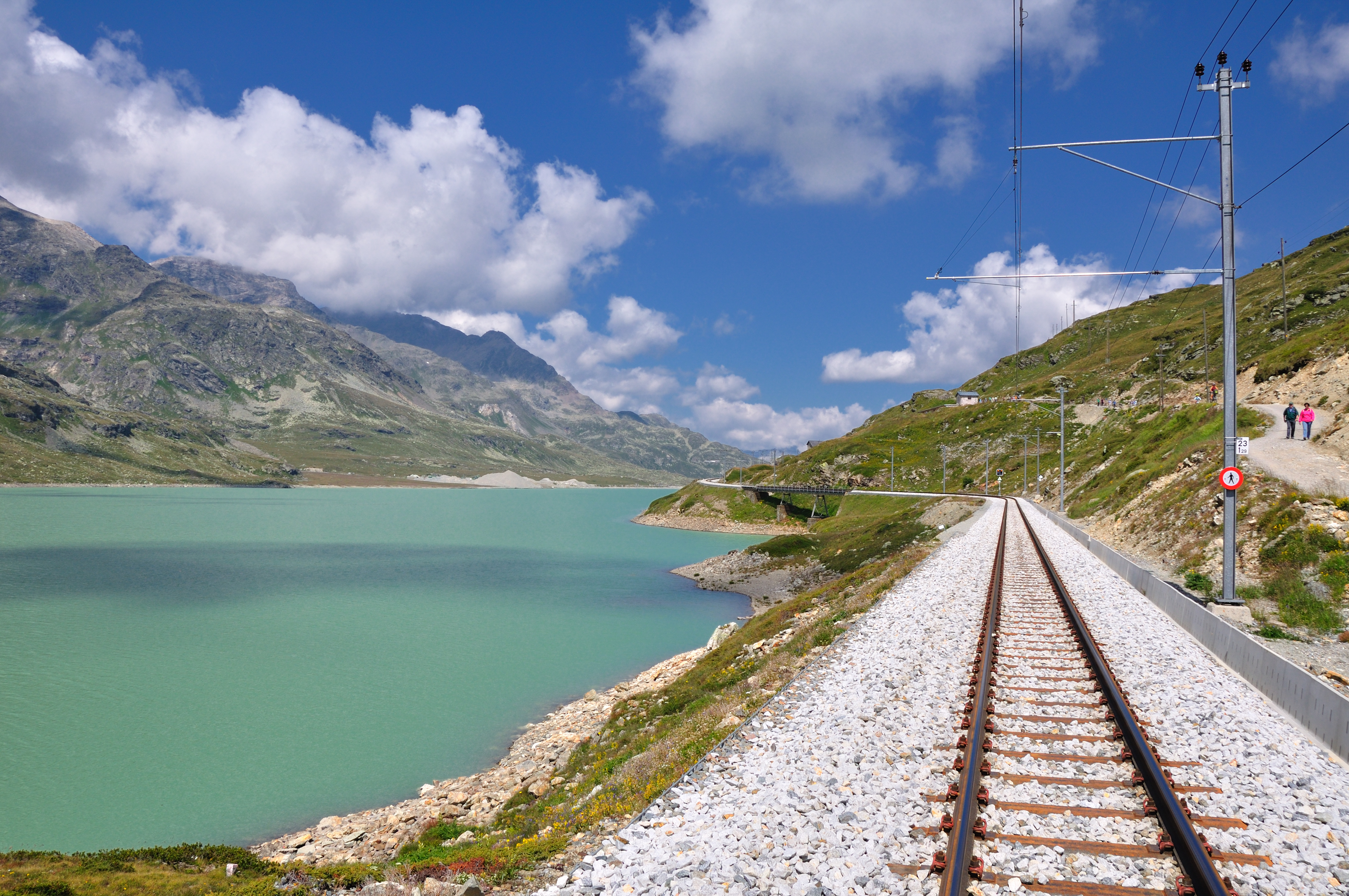
The Bernina line alongside the lake

== See also ==
- List of lakes of Switzerland
- List of mountain lakes of Switzerland
