= Alp Grüm railway station =

Train station in Graubünden, Switzerland

Alp Grüm
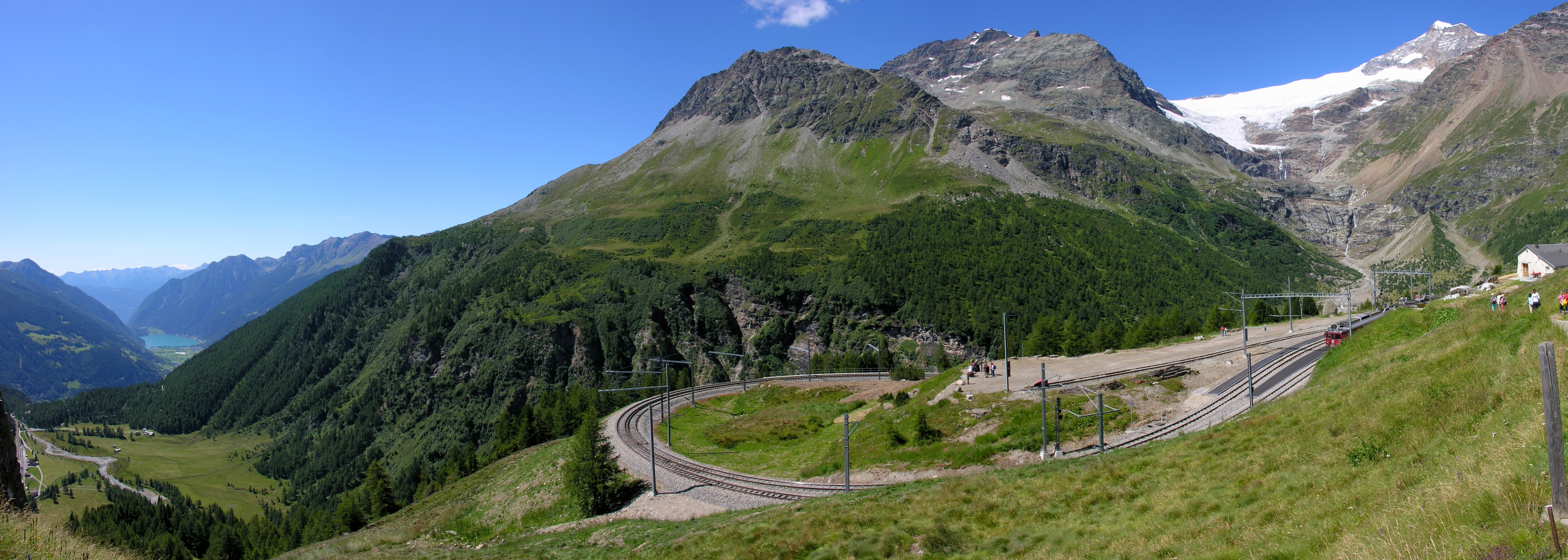
- Alp Grüm station from above

General information
- Location: 7710 Alp Grüm; Poschiavo; Switzerland
- Coordinates: 46°22′29″N 10°01′52″E
- Elevation: 2,091 m (6,860 ft)
- Owner: Rhaetian Railway
- Line: Bernina line
- Distance: 27.1 km (16.8 mi) from St. Moritz
- Train operators: Rhaetian Railway

Construction
- Architect: Nicolaus Hartmann (1923)

Other information
- Fare zone: 34 (Engadin Mobil)

History
- Opened: 5 July 1910

Passengers
- 2018: 440 per weekday

Services
| Preceding station | Rhaetian Railway | Following station |
|---|---|---|
| Bernina Diavolezza towards Chur or St. Moritz | Bernina Express | Poschiavo towards Tirano |
| Ospizio Bernina towards St. Moritz | RE 9 | Cavaglia towards Tirano |
| Ospizio Bernina towards St. Moritz | R 19 | Cavaglia towards Tirano |
Location

Alp Grüm railway station is a railway station in the municipality of Poschiavo, in the Swiss canton of Graubünden. It is located on the south side of Bernina Pass, on the Bernina line of the Rhaetian Railway. It serves the hamlet of Alp Grüm, which, except in summer, is accessible only from the railway. From the station, thanks mainly to the 180° curve immediately to the south, there are far-reaching views of the Palü Glacier, Lago Palu and the Puschlav.

The station has three through tracks and a siding. Two of the through tracks are served by its two platforms and station building.

From Alp Grüm the Bernina Railway snakes down around tight curves and spiral tunnels with a gradient of up to 7% into Puschlav, in the Italian-speaking part of Switzerland. The next station, Cavaglia, which is clearly visible from Alp Grüm, is 400 metres (1,300 ft) below, just 1.5 kilometres (0.93 mi) away in a straight line, but 6 kilometres (3.7 mi) distant by rail.

The section of line between Ospizio Bernina and Poschiavo, on which the station is located, was opened on 5 June 1910 by the Bernina Railway Company. During construction of the line, Alp Grüm was created as a crossing loop. The current station building, together with its buffet and hotel, was opened in 1923.

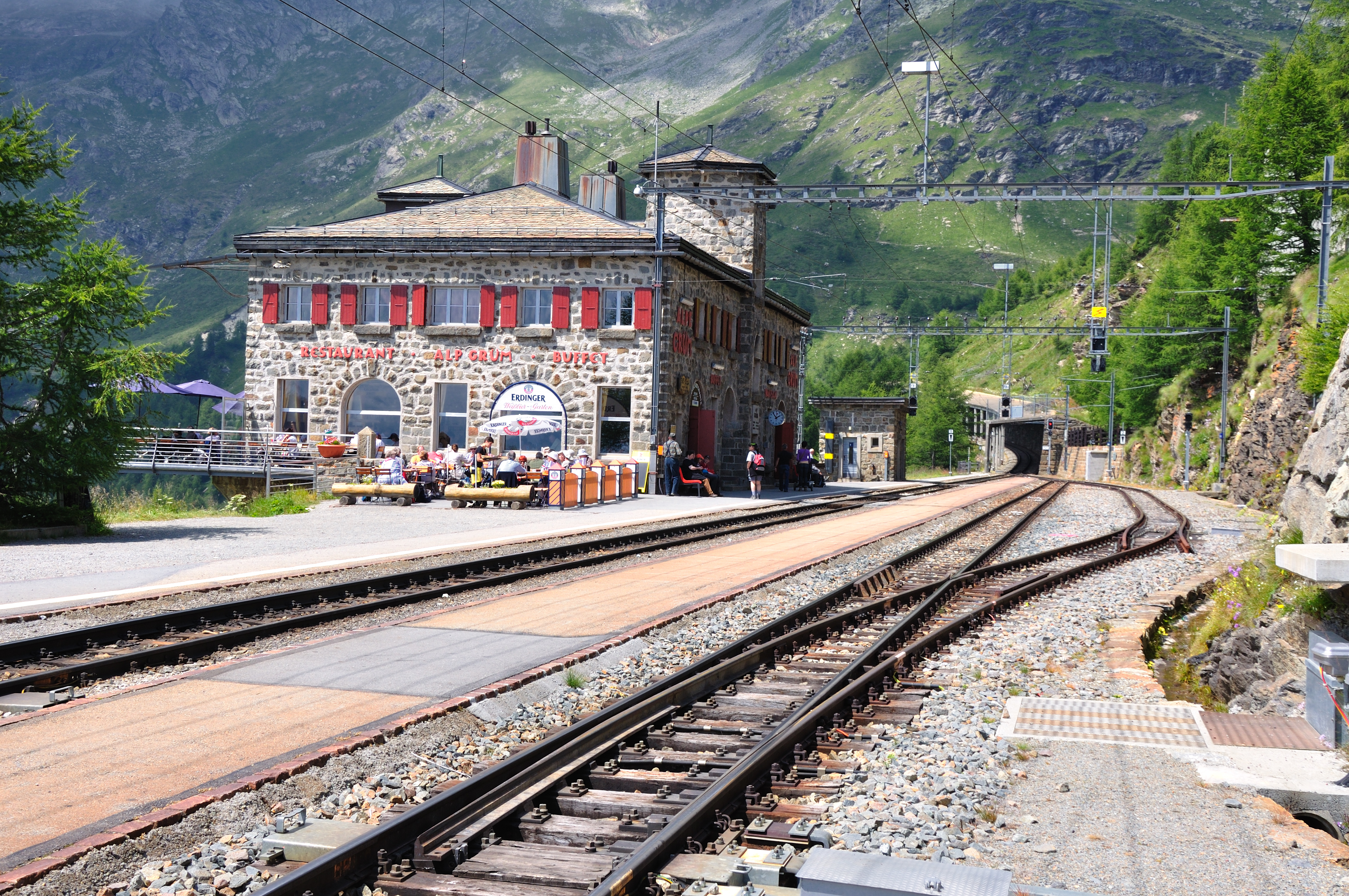
The station building in 2011

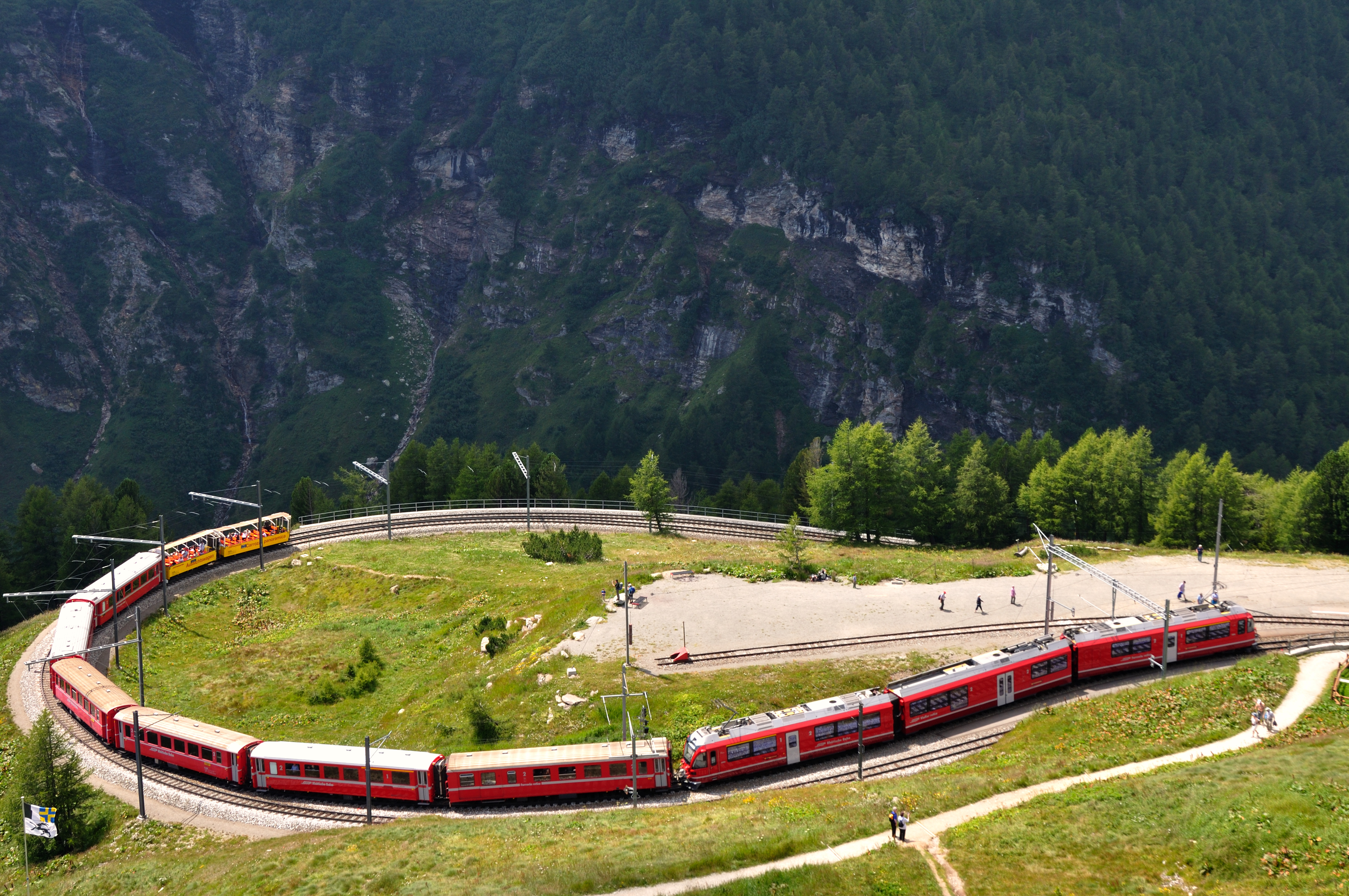
An ABe 8/12 hauled train from Tirano about to enter the station.

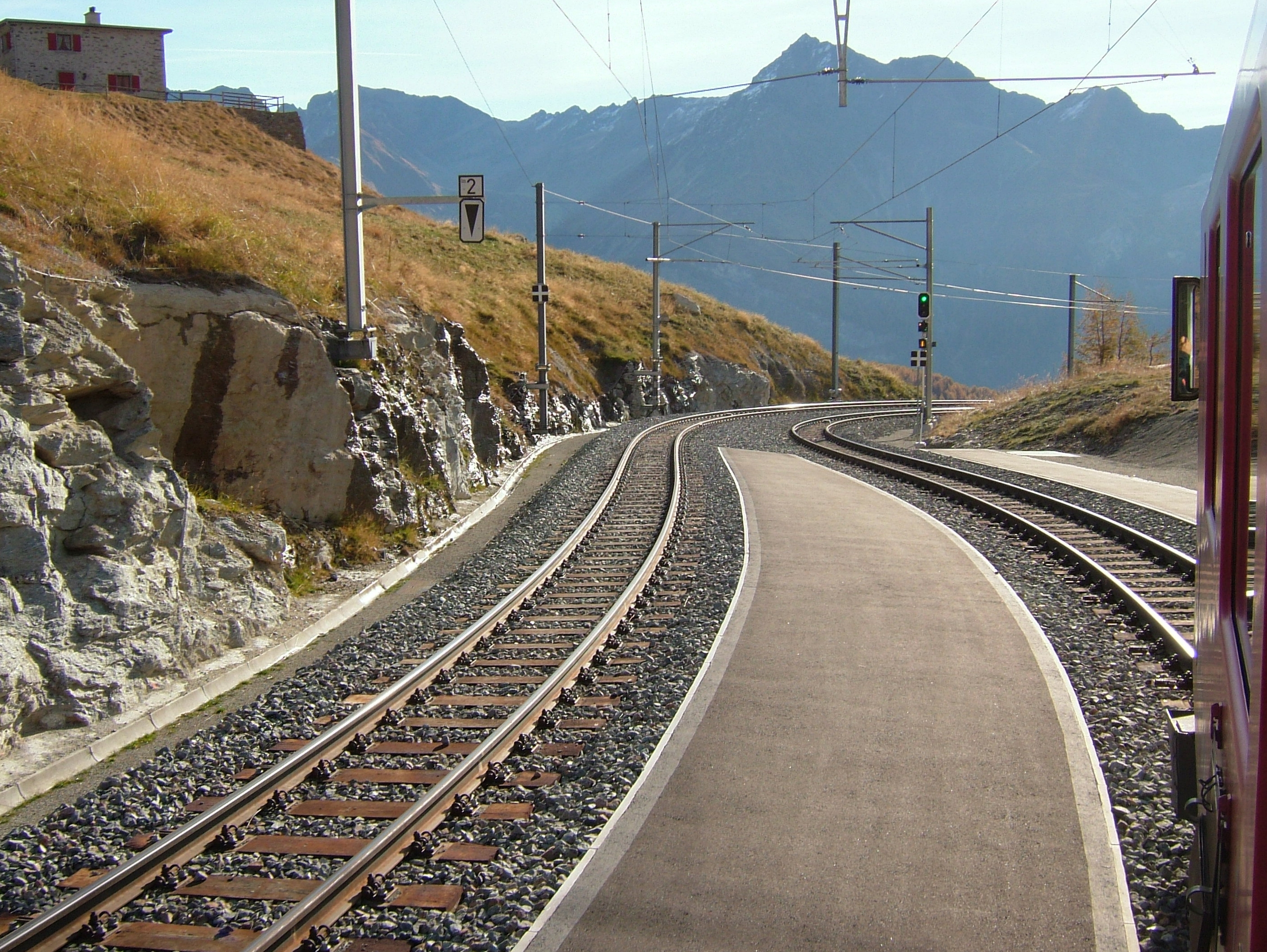
Alp Grüm station platforms.

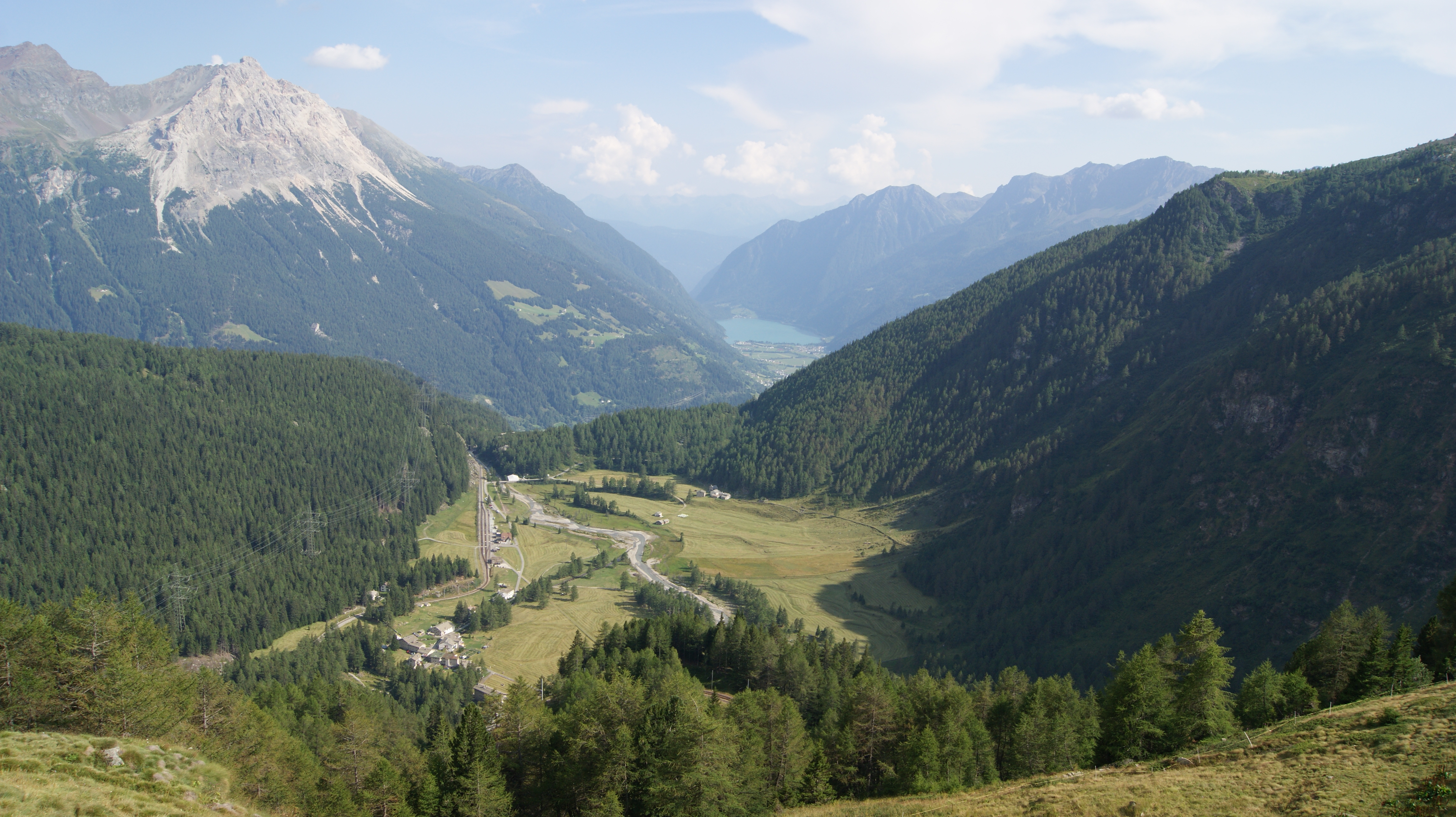
View from the station into the Puschlav, with Cavaglia station visible.

== Services ==
As of the December 2023 timetable change, the following services stop at Alp Grüm:

- Bernina Express: Several round-trips per day between Chur or St. Moritz and Tirano.
- RegioExpress / Regio: hourly service between St. Moritz and Tirano.
