= Palu (disambiguation) =

Palu is a city on the Indonesian island of Sulawesi.

Palu may also refer to:

== Places ==
- Palù, Verona, Italy
- Palu, Elazığ, Turkey
- Palu River, Sulawesi, Indonesia
- Piz Palü, a mountain in the Bernina Range, Switzerland
  - Palü Glacier
  - Palü Lake, a lake below Piz Palü
- Palu'e Island, or Palu Island, East Nusa Tenggara province, Indonesia
- Emirate of Palu, a Kurdish emirate from 1515 to c. 1839

== People ==
- Boris Palu (born 1996), a French rugby player
- Louie Palu (born 1968), a Canadian photographer and filmmaker
- Tevita Silifou Palu (born 1981), a New Zealand rugby player
- Tomasi Palu (born 1986), a Tongan rugby player
- Uno Palu (1933—2024), an Estonian decathlete
- Wycliff Palu (born 1982), known as Cliffy Palu, an Australian rugby player

== Other uses ==
- Unified Lumumbist Party (French: Parti Lumumbiste Unifié, PALU), a political party in the Democratic Republic of the Congo
- Progressive Workers' and Farmers' Union (Dutch: Progressieve Arbeiders- en Landbouwersunie, PALU), a political party in Surinam
- Cape Lisburne LRRS Airport, Alaska, U.S., ICAO airport code PALU
- Manilkara hexandra, a tree species, known regionally as Palu
- Palu language, a spurious language

== See also ==
- Palus (disambiguation)
