= San Carlo, Graubünden =

- village
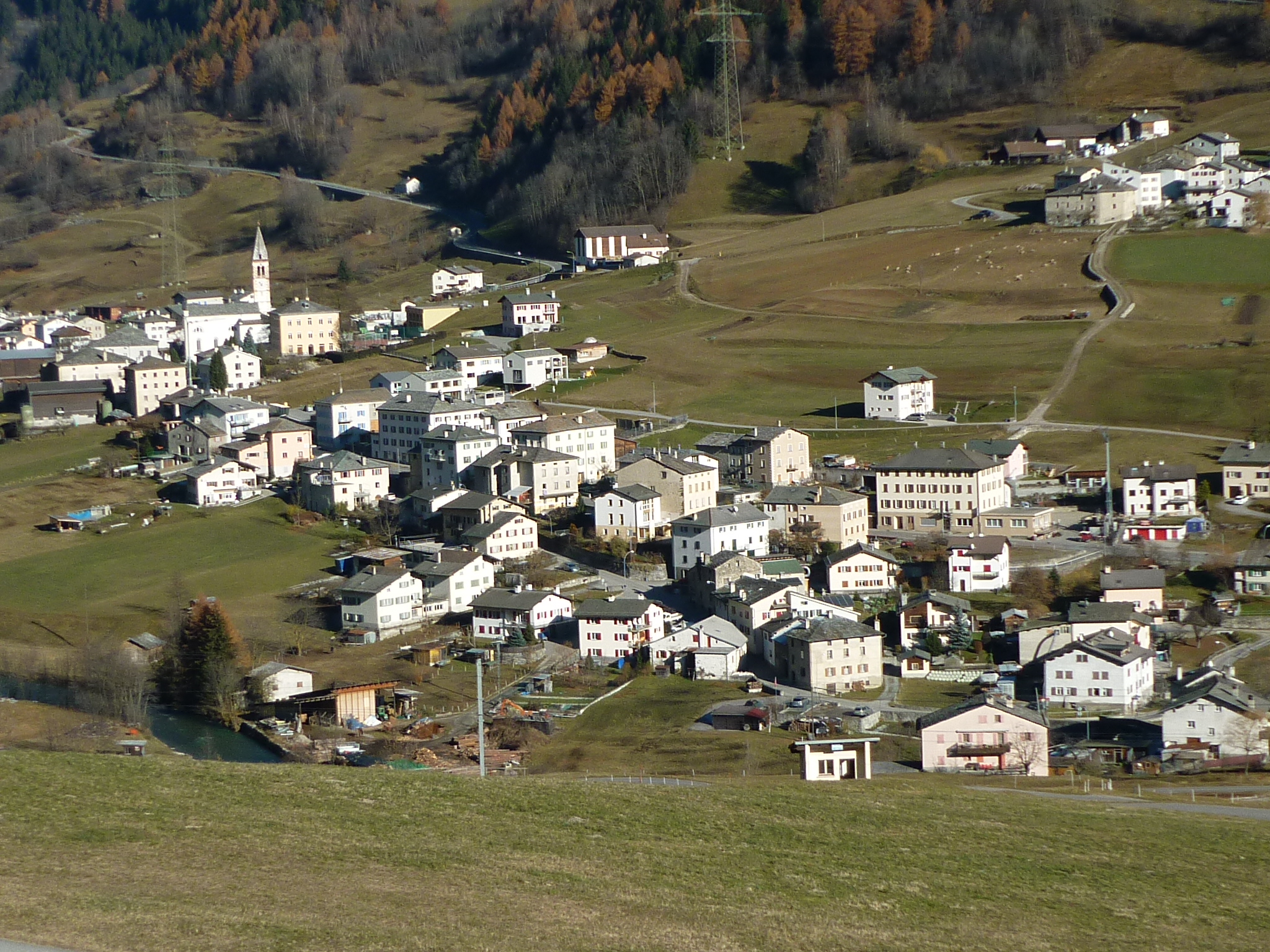

- Coordinates: 46°20′34″N 10°03′39″E
- Country: Switzerland

San Carlo is a village in the Val Poschiavo in the canton of Graubünden, Switzerland. It lies at 1,092 metres (3,583 ft) above sea level and is in the municipality of Poschiavo, some 2 kilometres (1.2 mi) north of the village of the same name.

The village lies on the southern approach to the Bernina Pass, and at one time was responsible for the maintenance of the road over the pass. It has a parish church, known as San Carlo Borromeo and built in 1613, and a primary school. The current road to the pass, Hauptstrasse 29, passes through the village.

The Robbia hydro-electric power station, which has an installed capacity of 27 MW and is fed by a pressurised pipe-line from Cavaglia, is situated some 400 metres (1,300 ft) from the centre of the village. The outfall of the station is fed into the Poschiavino river. Alongside the power station is an operations centre, responsible for managing all the production facilities and networks owned by Repower in Switzerland, including the Robbia station.

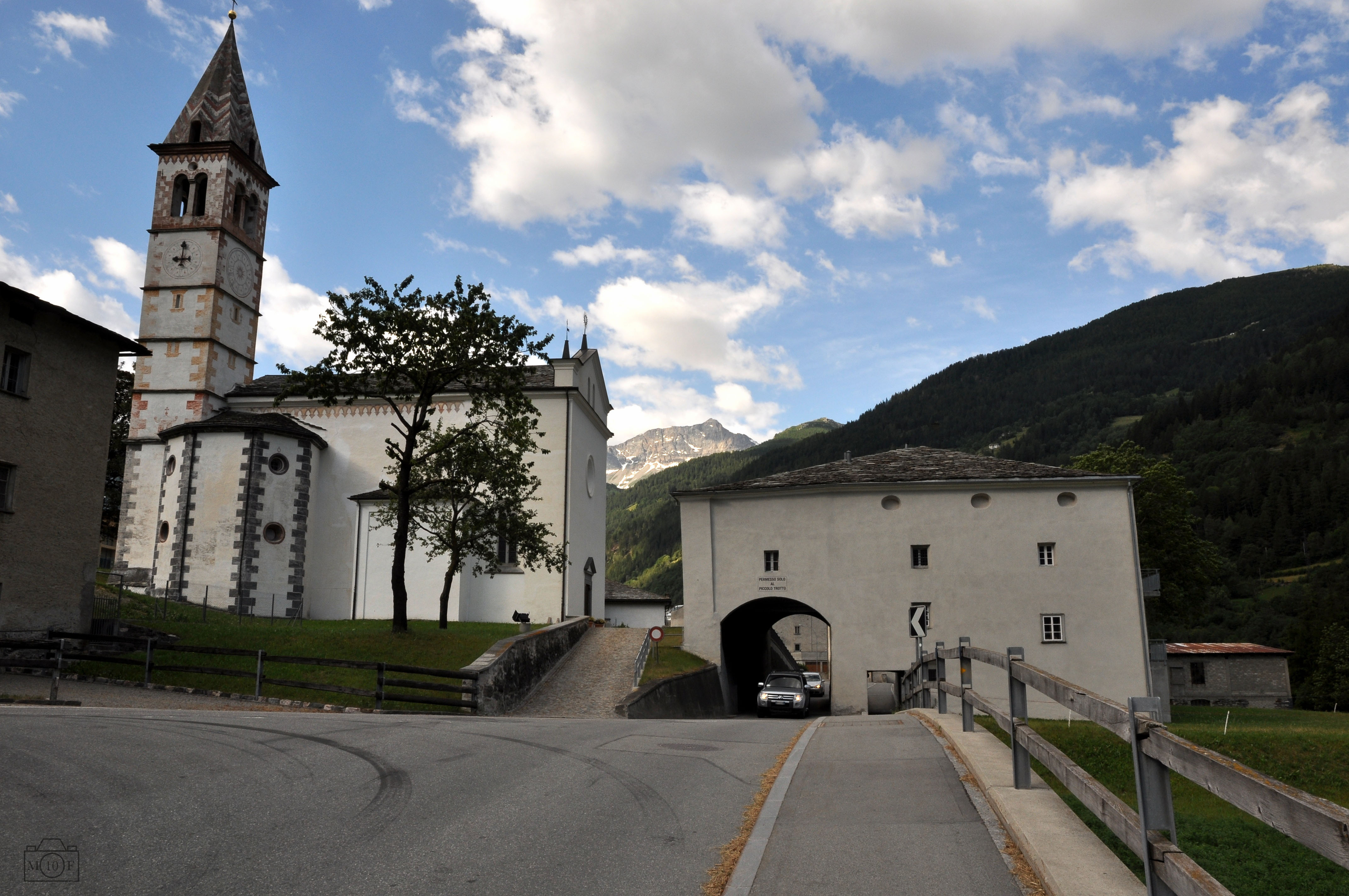
The church of San Carlo Borromeo

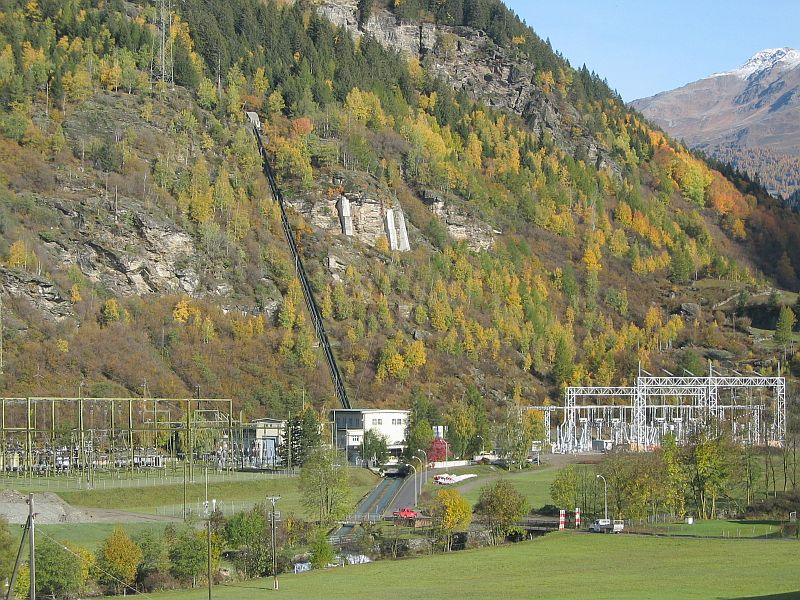
Robbia power station, with its supply pipe-line on the mountainside behind

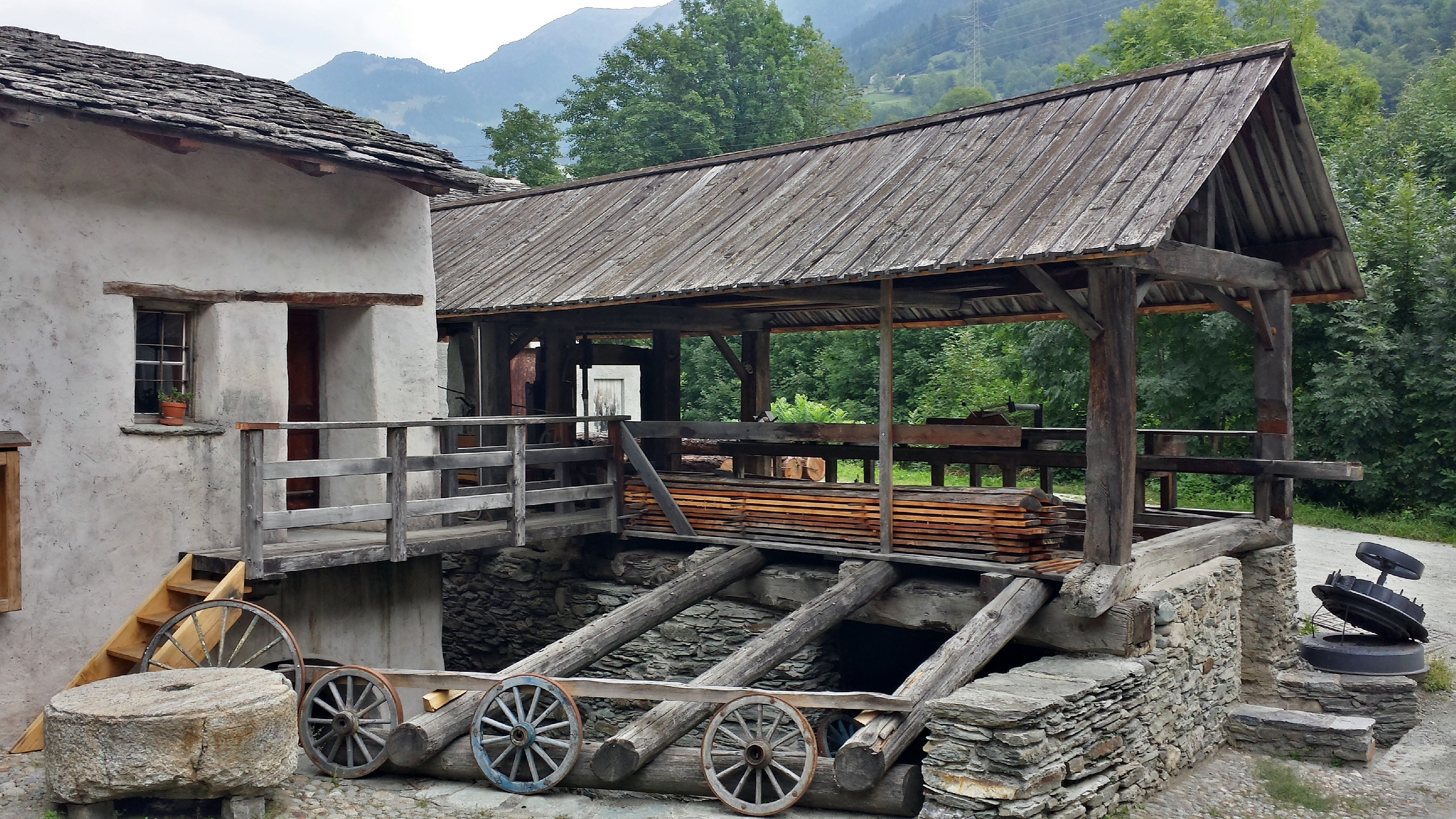
Sawmill in San Carlo
