= Ospizio =

Ospizio may refer to:

== Places ==
- Ospizio, frazione of Mercato San Severino, Campania, Italy
- Ospizio, quartiere of Reggio Emilia, Emilia-Romagna, Italy
- Ospizio Bernina, frazione of Poschiavo, Grisons, Switzerland
  - Ospizio Bernina railway station
- Ospizio San Giovanni, frazione of Campiglia Cervo, Piedmont, Italy

== Other ==
- Ospizio, Italian given name
- Foundling hospital, an institution for parents to permanently leave their children
- Ospizio dei poveri, Italian for poorhouse
  - Ospizio, former poorhouse in Floriana, Malta
