= Palus =

Palus may refer to:

- Palus, Maharashtra, a place in India
- 24194 Paľuš, a main belt asteroid, named for Pavel Paľuš (born 1936), Slovak astronomer
- Palus tribe, or Palouse people
- Palus, a grade of gladiator

== See also ==
- Palu (disambiguation)
- Paludal, a term used in geology and ecology to refer to marshland
- Palustrine, a term used for wetlands
- Plant de Palus, or Gros Verdot, a red wine grape
