= Cavaglia =

Hamlet in Graubünden, Switzerland

- hamlet
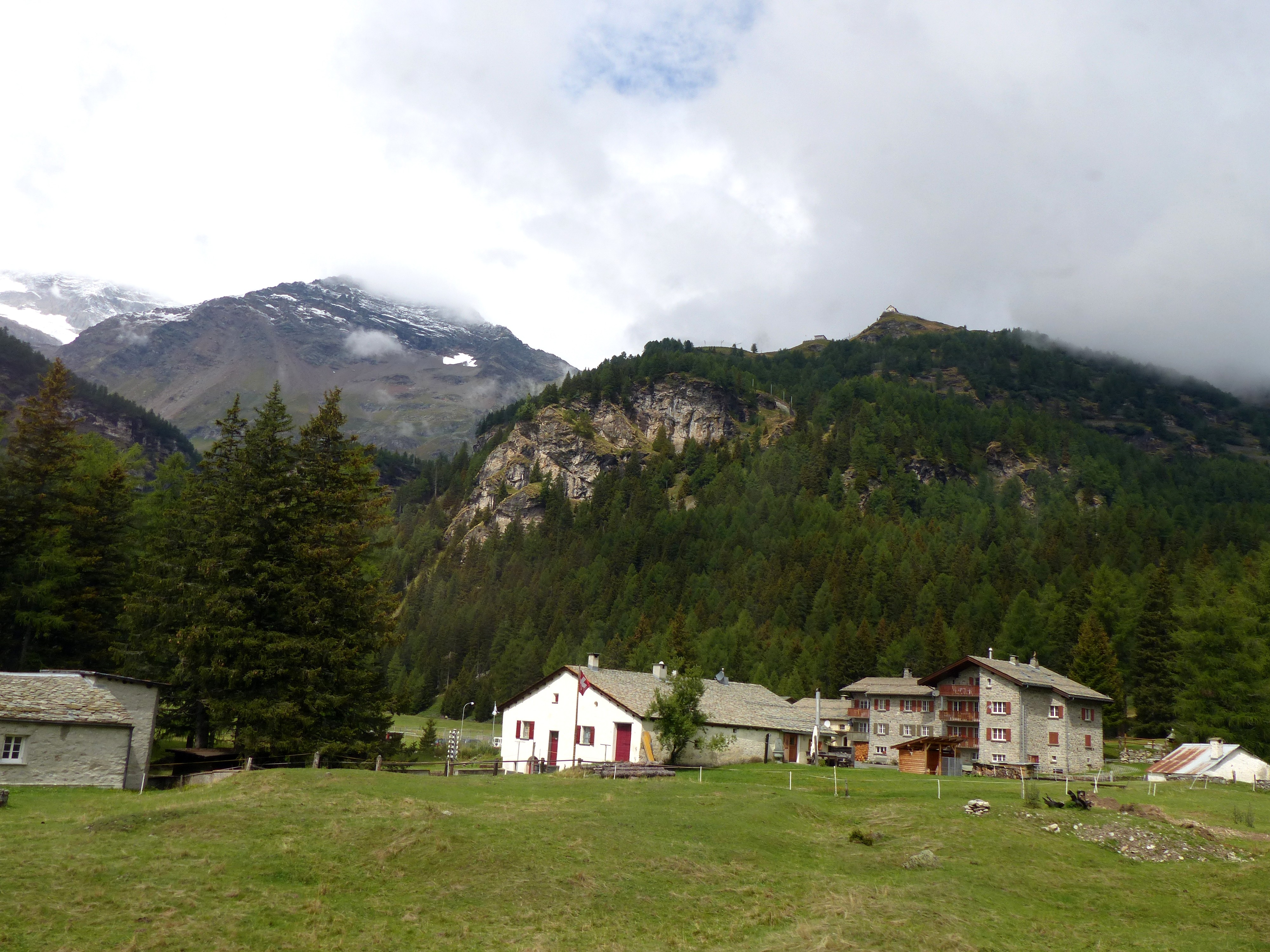
- Interactive map of Cavaglia
- Coordinates: 46°21′58″N 10°02′31″E
- Country: Switzerland
- Elevation: 1,703 m (5,587 ft)

Cavaglia is a small hamlet on the western flank of Val Poschiavo in the canton of Graubünden, Switzerland. Perched at 1,703 m (5,587 ft) on the hanging Plan da l'Alp terrace, it lies roughly 4.7 kilometres (2.9 mi) north-west of Poschiavo village but 700 metres (2,300 ft) higher, making the road distance 11 kilometres (6.8 mi) and the Bernina Line rail journey about 25 minutes. The locality is known for its UNESCO-listed railway station, the nearby Glacier Garden, and a cavern hydropower plant that forms part of the Val Poschiavo cascade.

== Geography and climate ==
Cavaglia occupies a broad glacio-fluvial bench shaped by the retreating Palü Glacier. The cavity-filled Cavagliasch stream drains the shelf, dropping through a gorge before joining the Poschiavino at Puntalta. A MeteoSwiss station records a mean annual temperature of 2 °C and about 1,230 mm of precipitation, roughly half of which falls as snow between October and April.

== Transport ==
Cavaglia railway station is a halt on the Bernina railway, part of the Rhaetian Railway in the Albula/Bernina Landscapes world-heritage corridor. To the south the line hugs the shore of Lago di Poschiavo; to the north it climbs street-running through Le Prese and Spinadascio before the gradient steepens toward Alp Grüm.

== Glacier Garden ==
South-west of the hamlet, melt-water vortices from the last glaciation carved more than 30 "giant's kettles" up to 15 m deep in the greywacke bedrock. Protected since 1996 as the Giardino dei Ghiacciai di Cavaglia, the geosite features walkways and trilingual panels and draws about 35,000 visitors a year on tours coordinated with train schedules. A marked nature trail circles the hamlet and links the Glacier Garden to panoramic viewpoints over Val Poschiavo.

== Hydropower ==
The 7 MW Cavaglia hydro-electric power station (1927) stands in a cavern beneath the terrace, reached by an 800 m pressurised tunnel and service funicular from Palü power station at Palü Lake. Water leaves the plant via the Cavagliasch, then enters a pipeline to Robbia power station at San Carlo. A short surface spur once linked the cavern to Cavaglia station for heavy equipment deliveries; its trace is still visible in the Bernina-line heritage dossier.
