= Rhaetian Railway ABe 8/12 =

Swiss multiple unit train class

Rhaetian Railway ABe 8/12 Allegra
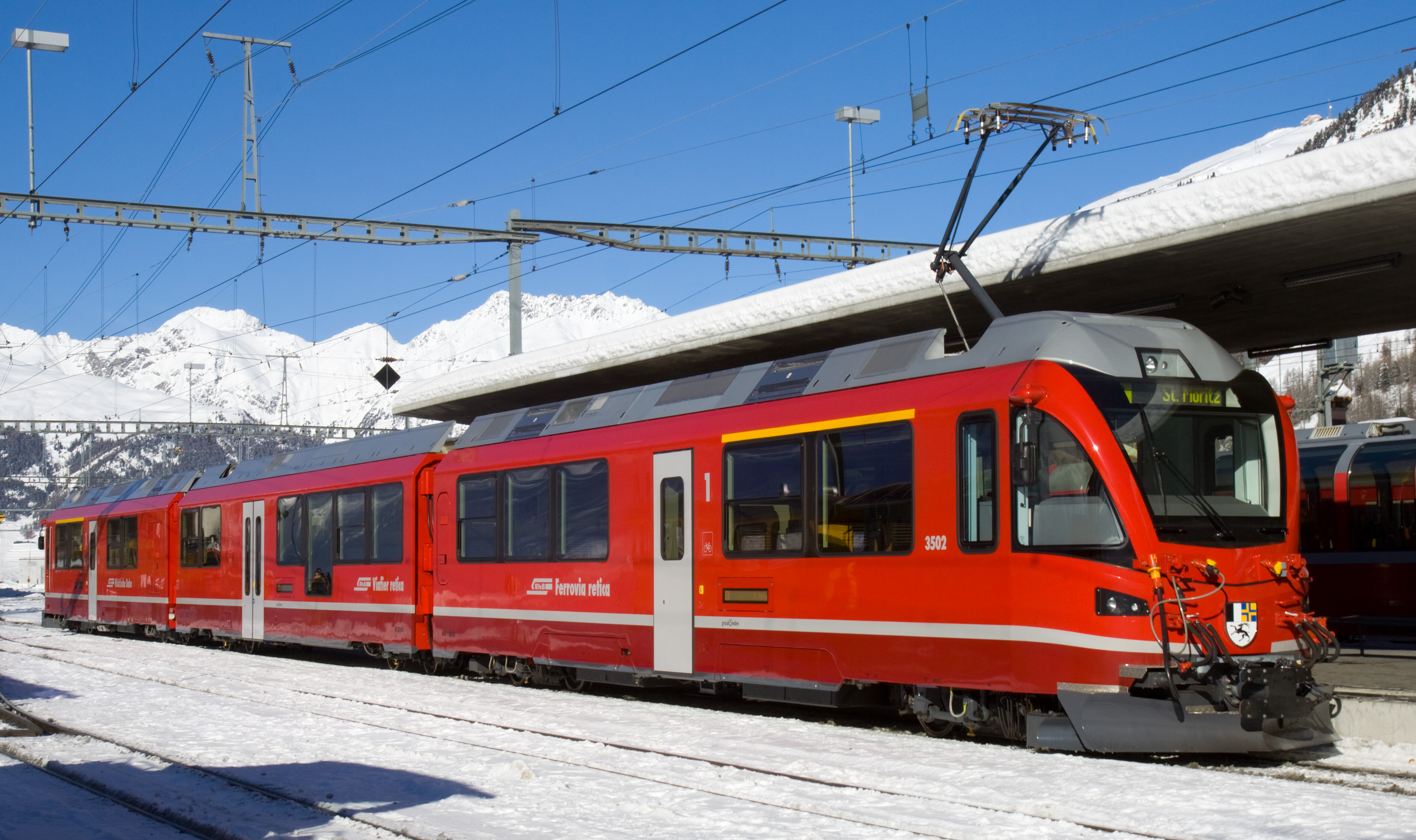
- ABe 8/12 Allegra at Pontresina station.
- In service: 2009–
- Manufacturer: Stadler Rail
- Constructed: 2009–2011
- Number built: 15
- Fleet numbers: 3501–3515
- Operators: Rhaetian Railway

Specifications
- Train length: 49.5 m (162 ft 4 7/8 in)
- Width: 2.65 m (8 ft 8 3/8 in)
- Maximum speed: 100 km/h (62 mph)
- Traction system: ABB BORDLINE CC750 MS 2-level IGBT–VVVF
- Power output: AC: 2,600 kW (3,490 hp); DC: 2,400 kW (3,220 hp)
- Tractive effort: 130 kN (29,230 lbf); 260 kN (58,450 lbf)
- Electric system(s): 1 kV DC/11 kV 16.7 Hz AC Overhead
- Current collection: Pantograph
- UIC classification: Bo′Bo′+2′2′+Bo′Bo′
- Track gauge: 1,000 mm (3 ft 3 3/8 in) metre gauge

The Rhaetian Railway ABe 8/12, which is also known as the Allegra, is a class of dual voltage metre gauge three car multiple unit trains of the Rhaetian Railway (RhB), which is the main railway network in the canton of Graubünden, Switzerland.

The class is so named under the Swiss locomotive and railcar classification system. According to that system, ABe 8/12 denotes an electric railcar train with first- and second-class compartments, and a total of 12 axles, eight of which are drive axles.

== Technical details ==
The ABe 8/12 trains were delivered between 2009 and 2011. They are used mainly on Rhaetian Railway routes with steep inclines: the Arosa line, the Bernina Railway, and the route from Landquart to Davos. They are fitted with dual voltage electrical equipment, to enable them to operate on both the Rhaetian Railway's core network, which is electrified at 11 kV 16.7 Hz, and on the Bernina Railway, which is electrified at 1,000 V DC.

Each of the ABe 8/12s is equipped with comfortable air conditioned compartments for both first class and second class passengers. The first class compartment at the front of each train offers a pleasant view of the track from directly behind the driver. In the middle of the ABe 8/12s is a large low floor area, which also allows disabled passengers a comfortable ride. Most units entered regular service soon after delivery.

== Metre gauge speed record ==
On 5 December 2009, during regular pre-service shakedown trials in the Vereina Tunnel, an ABe 8/12 set a new speed record for metre gauge railways of 139 km/h. The previous record had stood at 134 km/h, and had been held by the Regionalverkehr Bern-Solothurn (RBS). The maximum speed previously registered on the RhB had been 110 km/h.

== Train names ==
On 1 May 2010, four trains were baptised in Landquart. The train 3501 got the name of Willem Jan Holsboer, the Dutch founder of the Rhaetian Railway; the train 3502 is called after Friedrich Hennings, an engineer who was the chairman of the building of the Albulabahn. The train 3503 is called after the Swiss alpine ski racer Carlo Janka (grown up in Obersaxen GR) who won the world championship and the olympic gold medal in the giant slalom and who is the overall winner in Men's Alpine Skiing World Cup. The train 3504 got the name of Dario Cologna (grown up in Mustair GR) who is the overall winner of Men's cross-country skier and also gold medal winner of Vancouver.

== List of trains ==
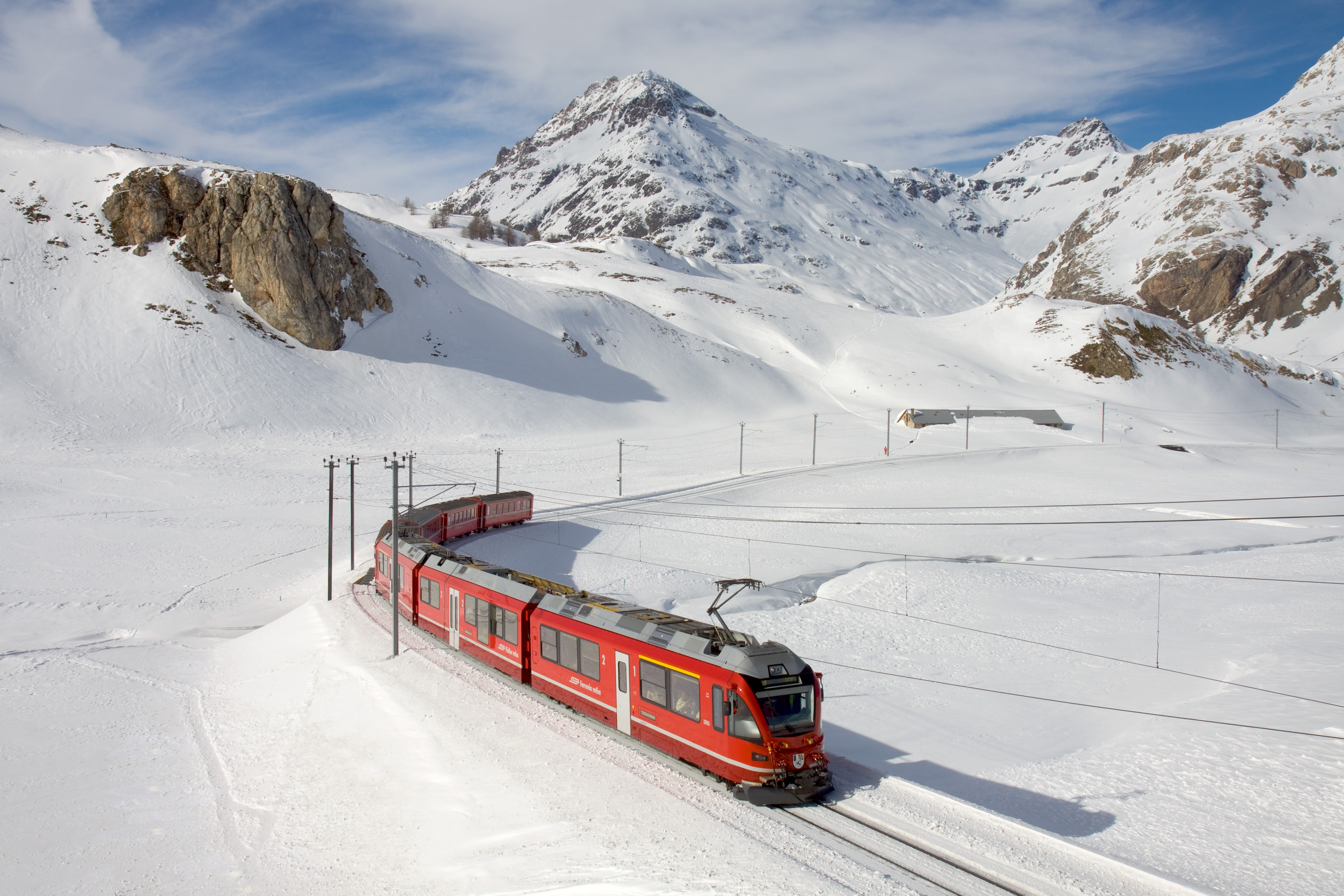
ABe 8/12 3503, with a Regional train to Tirano, on the bank between Bernina Lagalb and Ospizio Bernina.

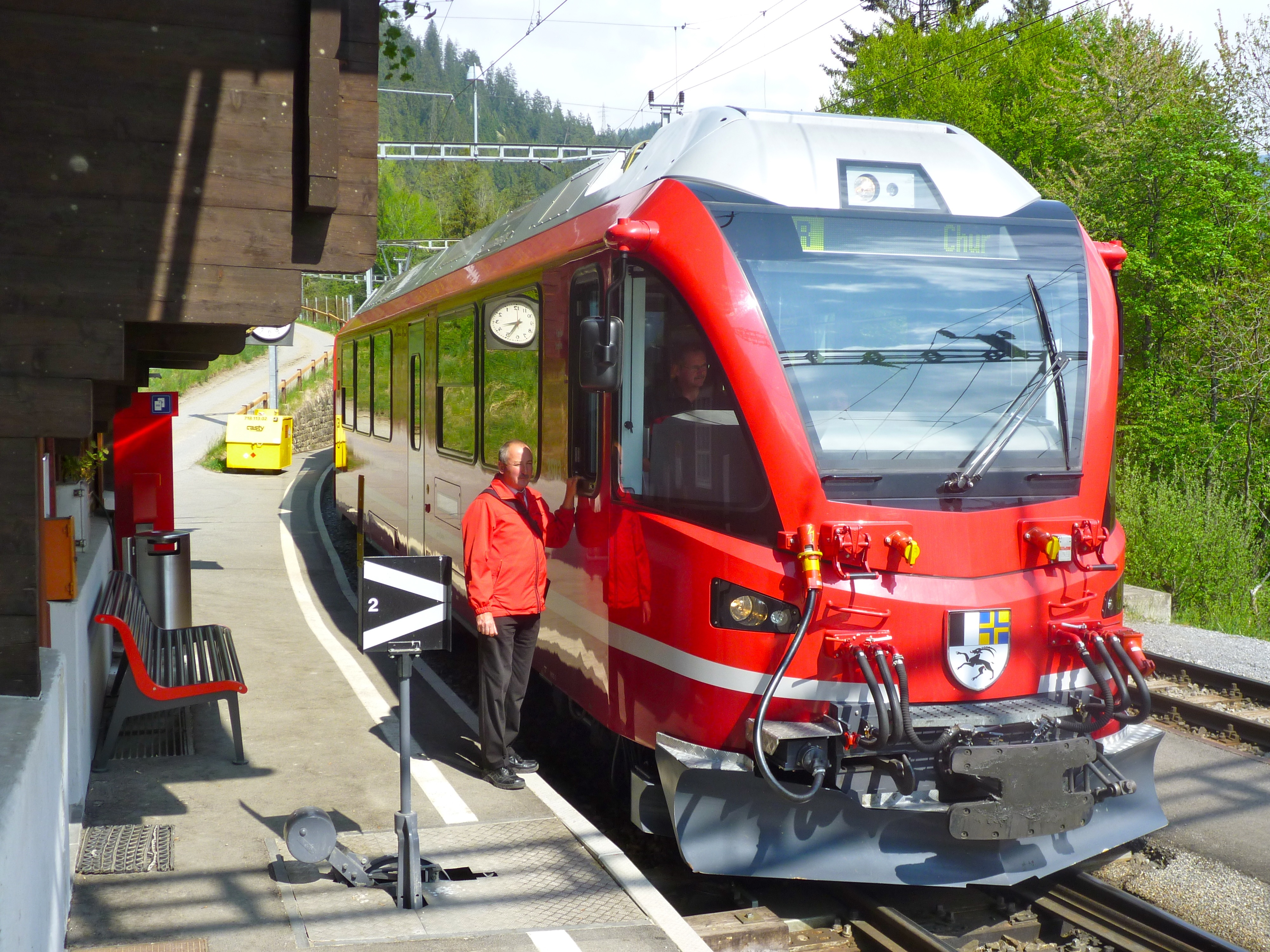
An ABe 8/12 at Lüen-Castiel, Chur-Arosa railway.

The trains in the class are named, and entered service, as follows:

List of the ABe 8/12 trains of the Rhaetian Railway
Fleet no.	Name	Commissioning	Status
3501	Willem Jan Holsboer	October 2009	in service
3502	Friedrich Hennings	November 2009	in service
3503	Carlo Janka	March 2010	in service
3504	Dario Cologna	April 2010	in service
3505	Giovanni Segantini	April 2010	in service
3506	Anna von Planta	Juli 2010	in service
3507	Benedetg Fontana	August 2010	in service
3508	Richard Coray	September 2010	in service
3509	Placidus Spescha	November 2010	in service
3510	Alberto Giacometti	November 2010	in service
3511	Otto Barblan	December 2010	in service
3512	Jörg Jenatsch	January 2011	in service
3513	Simeon Bavier	January 2011	in service
3514	Steivan Brunies	March 2011	in service
3515	Alois Carigiet	March 2011	in service
