= Palü Lake =

Lake in Graubünden, Switzerland

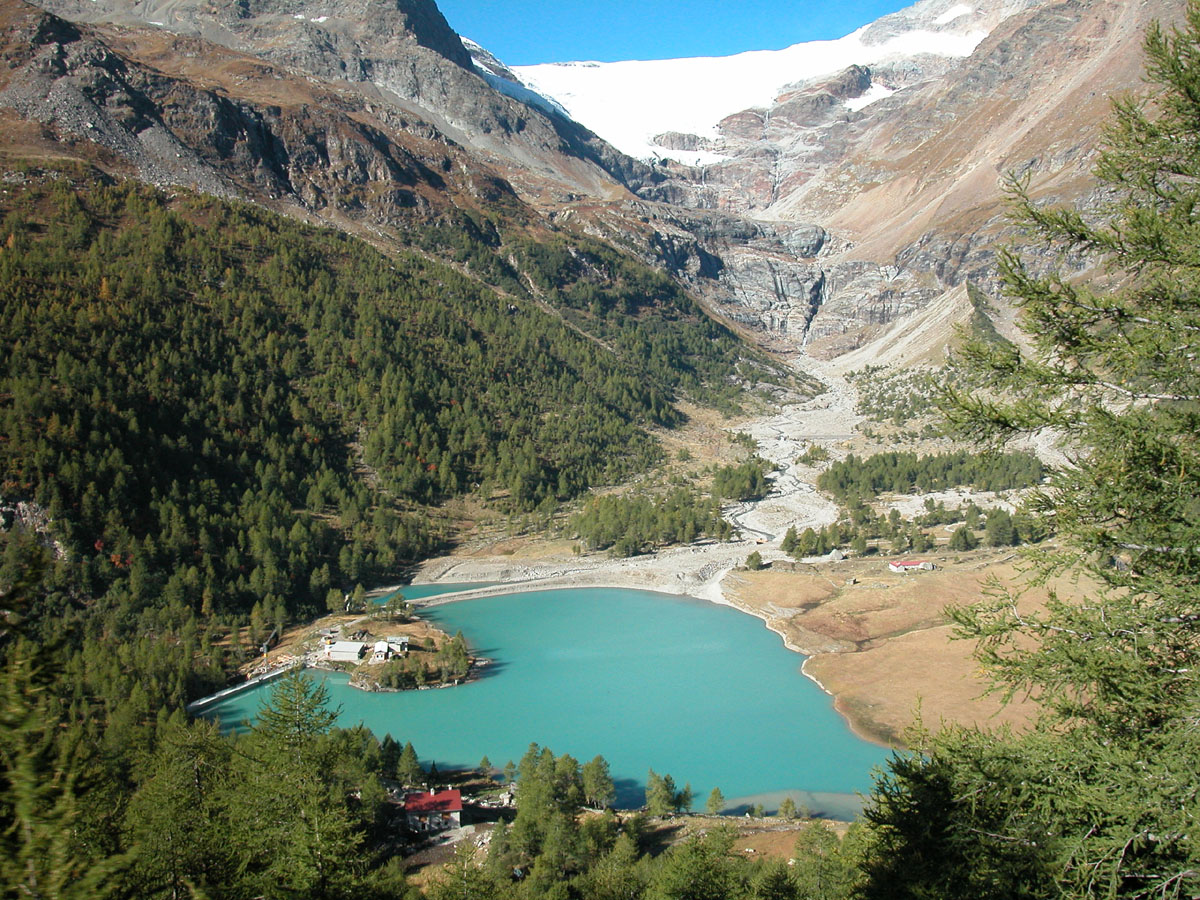

- Location within Canton of Graubünden Location within Switzerland Location within Italy Location within Alps
- Interactive map of Palü Lake
- Location: Grisons
- Coordinates: 46°22′22″N 10°01′33″E
- Type: natural lake, reservoir
- Basin countries: Switzerland
- Surface area: 5.2 ha (13 acres)
- Surface elevation: 1,923 m (6,309 ft)

Palü Lake (Italian: Lago Palü, Romansh: Lagh da Palü, German Palüsee) is a lake below Piz Palü in the Swiss canton of Graubünden. It has an elevation of 1,923 m (6,309 ft) and a surface area of 5.2 ha (13 acres). Water from Palü Glacier feeds into the lake.

In 1926, a dam was built enabling use of the lake as a reservoir. The nearby Palü hydro-electric power station has an installed capacity of 10 MW and is fed by a pressurised pipe-line from Lago Bianco. The outfall from this plant, along with water from Lago Palü, feeds an underground pipeline to the Cavaglia power station at Cavaglia. The 800-metre (2,600 ft) tunnel connecting the two plants also accommodates a funicular railway that is open to the public during tours of the plants.

== Description ==
Palü Lake is a small proglacial lake perched on a hanging shelf north of Alp Grüm, backed by the serrated icefalls of the Palü Glacier. Meltwater laden with rock flour gives the 5.2-ha basin its milky-turquoise colour, and the short outflow forms the Cavagliasch stream, which plunges 250 m to meet the Poschiavino. A natural moraine once dammed the lake, but in 1926 engineers embedded a 14-m-high gravity wall inside the moraine core and raised the level by about 8 m to create seasonal storage.

The impounded water feeds Centrale Palü, the first stage in Repower's Val Poschiavo cascade. From the lake a pressure tunnel channels up to 4,500 litres per second down a 230 m-head to two Pelton turbines that have generated power since 1927; as of 2025, the station delivers 10 MW and typically produces 24 GWh a year. After passing the generators, the water continues through the 800-m service tunnel—shared with a maintenance funicular—to Cavaglia and then through successive plants at Robbia and Campocologno, squeezing five uses from the same water before it joins the Adda.

Because Alp Grüm railway station (2,091 m) sits on a ledge directly above the lake, it offers an unobstructed view of Lago Palü, the Palü Glacier and upper Val Poschiavo. A way-marked footpath of about 3 km (45 min, 250 m descent) leads from the station through larch woodland and alpine meadow to the shoreline, where information panels describe local glacial change and the hydropower scheme; the route is usually snow-free from late June to October.

== See also ==
- List of mountain lakes of Switzerland
