= Palü Glacier =

Glacier in Switzerland

- Vadret da Pälu
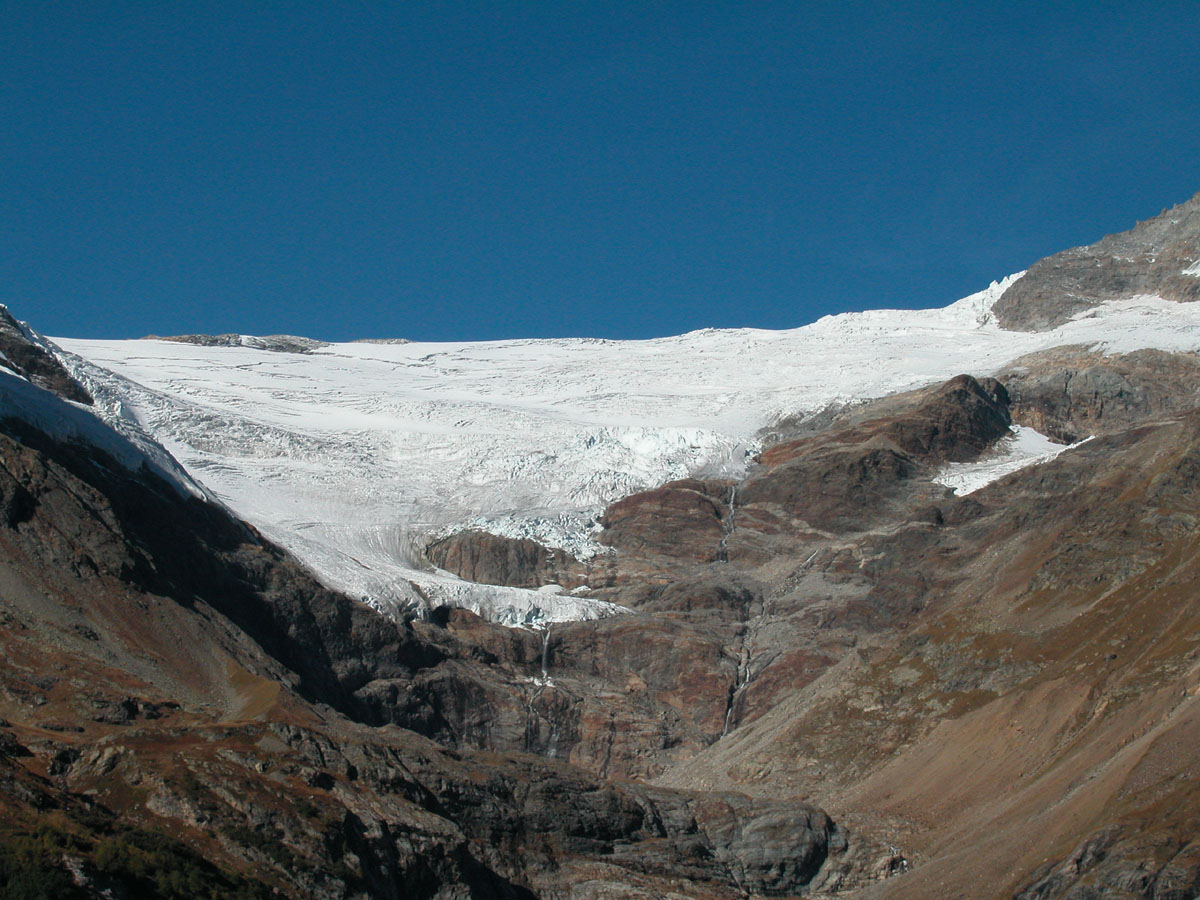
- Interactive map of Palü Glacier
- Location: Graubünden, Switzerland
- Coordinates: 46°22′0″N 9°58′30″E
- Length: 3.5 km

The Palü Glacier (Romansh: Vadret da Palü) is a 3.5 km long glacier (2005) on the southeastern flank of Piz Palü in the Bernina Range. It belongs to the valley of Poschiavo in the canton of Graubünden. In 1973 it had an area of 6.47 km^{2}.

A lake formed at the bottom of the glacier, at a height of 2,322 metres. Below the glacier lake is another lake, the Lago Palü. Both lakes can be easily reached from the Alp Grüm railway station on the Bernina line.

== See also ==
- List of glaciers in Switzerland
- List of glaciers
- Retreat of glaciers since 1850
- Swiss Alps
