= Poschiavino =

River in Switzerland and Italy

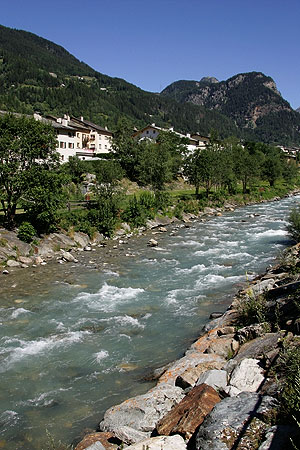
- Poschiavino at Poschiavo

Location
- Country: Switzerland, Italy

Physical characteristics
- Mouth: Adda
  - coordinates: 46°12′05″N 10°08′47″E

Basin features
- Progression: Adda→ Po→ Adriatic Sea

Poschiavino is an 30-kilometre (19 mi) long river that rises in the Swiss canton of Graubünden and flows into the Italian province of Sondrio. The majority of the river is in Switzerland, with just 3 kilometres (1.9 mi) in Italy.

The source of the river lies at 2,260 metres (7,410 ft) above sea level in the Rhaetian Alps, close to the Livigno Pass. From here the river flows south through the upper Val Poschiavo, past the settlements of La Rösa, Poschiavo and Le Prese, before entering the 2.5 kilometres (1.6 mi) long Lago di Poschiavo. Below the lake, the river passes the settlements of Brusio and Campocologno before crossing the border into Italy. It flows into the Adda in Tirano, at 441 metres (1,447 ft) above sea level. The water of the river and its tributaries is used to power several hydro-electric plants owned by Repower AG.

== Hydrology and catchment ==
Poschiavino drains a 153 km^{2} alpine catchment, 82% of which lies inside Switzerland. Continuous gauging at Le Prese (962 m) shows an average discharge of 6.0 cubic metres per second (m^{3}/s)| for 1974–2023, with spring snow-melt and early-summer glacier melt producing a sharp peak of 12–14 m^{3}/s in June. Extreme spates linked to warm-rain events have exceeded 130 m^{3}/s (18 July 1987), while winter low-flows routinely drop below 0.5 m^{3}/s.

== Environment ==
A 2020 canton-wide assessment classifies the upper Poschiavino as "good ecological status", with high benthic diversity in braided reaches around La Rösa and Cavaglia. Downstream of Lago di Poschiavo, hydro-peaking by the power stations makes the river rise and fall by as much as 1.5 m each day. At peak release the flow can be roughly ten times greater than the quiet-water minimum—a "schwall–sunk" pattern that disturbs the gravel beds where grayling and brown trout lay their eggs. Pilot measures completed in 2019—woody-debris deflectors, gravel supplementation, and reconnection of side-channels—have already increased riffle area by 0.8 ha and improved juvenile fish density by 40%. Further widening of the channel at Brusio is planned for 2026 under the cantonal revitalisation programme.

== Hydropower scheme ==
Repower AG exploits a 438 m gross head between Lago Palü, Lago di Poschiavo and the Italian border through a cascade of plants: Palü (36 MW), Cavaglia (7 MW), Robbia (now 45 MW after a 2022 repowering) and the dual Campocologno stations (174 MW). Combined annual generation averages about 1,000 GWh, two-thirds of which is exported into the Italian grid at Tirano. The company's 2024 sustainability report notes that modernised turbines at Robbia raise overall cascade efficiency by 6% while reducing residual-flow deficits flagged in earlier environmental audits. A proposed 1,000 MW Lago Bianco–Poschiavo pumped-storage link remains frozen for economic reasons, although all federal consents are in place.
