= Ospizio Bernina railway station =

Railway station in Switzerland

Ospizio Bernina
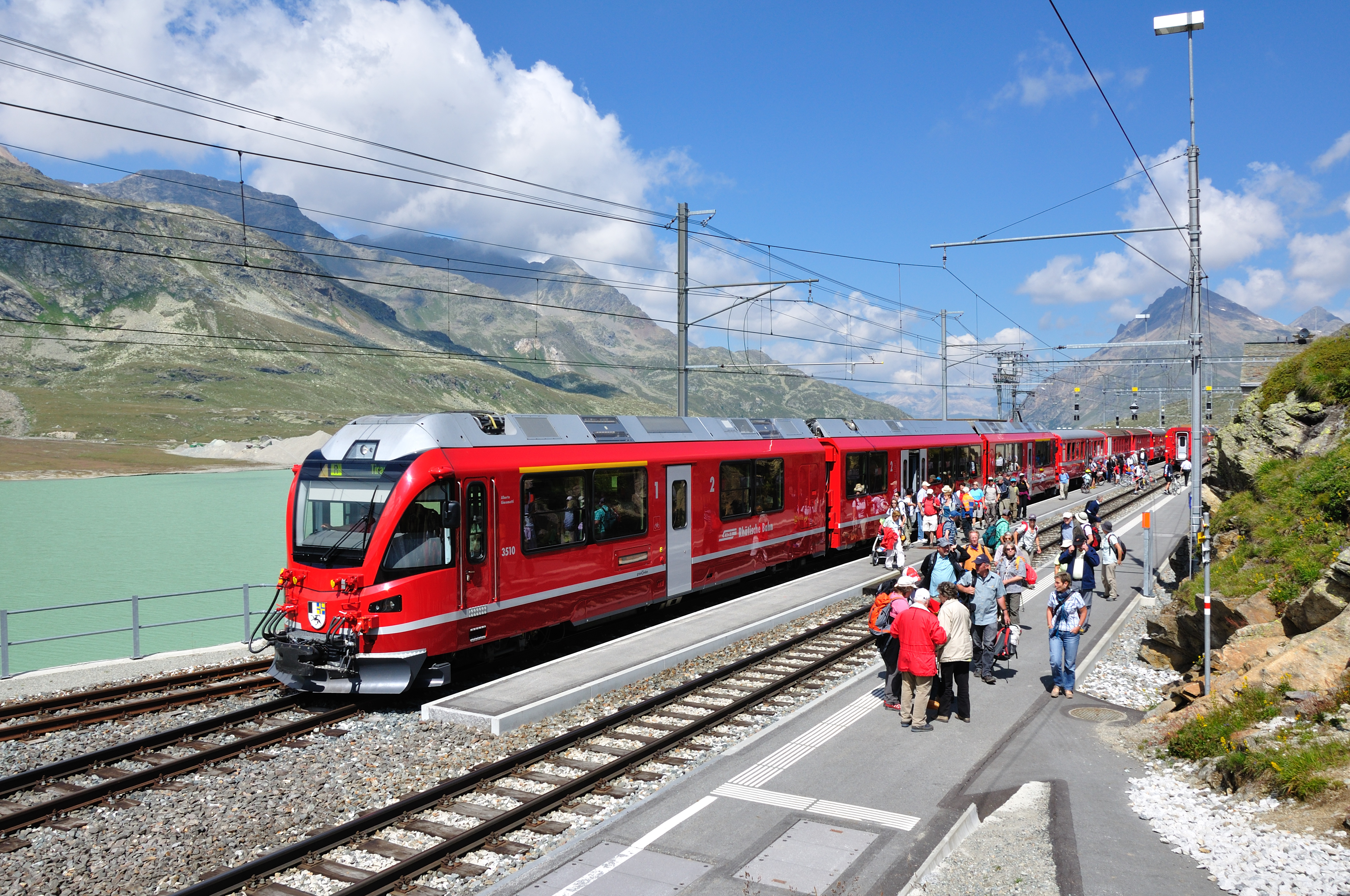
- An ABe 8/12 at the station in 2011

General information
- Location: 7710 Ospizio Bernina; Poschiavo; Switzerland
- Coordinates: 46°24′32″N 10°01′11″E
- Elevation: 2,253 m (7,392 ft)
- Owner: Rhaetian Railway
- Line: Bernina line
- Distance: 22.3 km (13.9 mi) from St. Moritz
- Train operators: Rhaetian Railway
- Connections: PostAuto Schweiz

Construction
- Architect: Nicolaus Hartmann (1912, 1925)

Other information
- Fare zone: 33 (Engadin Mobil)

History
- Opened: 5 July 1910
- Former names: Bernina-Hospiz

Passengers
- 2018: 280 per weekday

Services
Preceding station	Rhaetian Railway	Following station
Bernina Lagalb towards St. Moritz	RE 9	Alp Grüm towards Tirano
Bernina Lagalb towards St. Moritz	R 19	Alp Grüm towards Tirano
Location

Ospizio Bernina railway station is a station on the Bernina line of the Rhaetian Railway. The station lies on the shores of Lago Bianco, near the Bernina Pass, between the Engadin and the valley of Poschiavo, in Graubünden. It is named after the hostel (historically, ospizio in Italian) that lies on the road pass, 50 metres above the station. Administratively, the area belongs to the municipality of Poschiavo.

Ospizio Bernina, at an elevation of 2,253 metres above sea level, is both the highest station and highest point on the Bernina Railway and also on the entire Rhaetian Railway network. It is also the highest railway station in Graubünden and Eastern Switzerland. The Bernina Railway is notably the highest rail crossing in Europe. Hourly services in both direction operate on this line, throughout the year, despite harsh winter conditions.

The station has two principal through tracks, each served by a platform, together with several sidings. The station has a three-story stone-built station building and also includes several maintenance buildings. A notable feature is that the southern approach track to the station actually passes through one of these buildings, which also incorporates (on a different track) a covered turntable for use by the line's snowploughs, a transformer station and a dwelling house.

The railway station was opened with the completion of the line in 1910. The station building dates from the opening, but was extended and adopted its existing form in 1925. At the time of opening the elevation of the station was measured to be 2,256 metres, and this value is reflected in at least one original sign on the station.

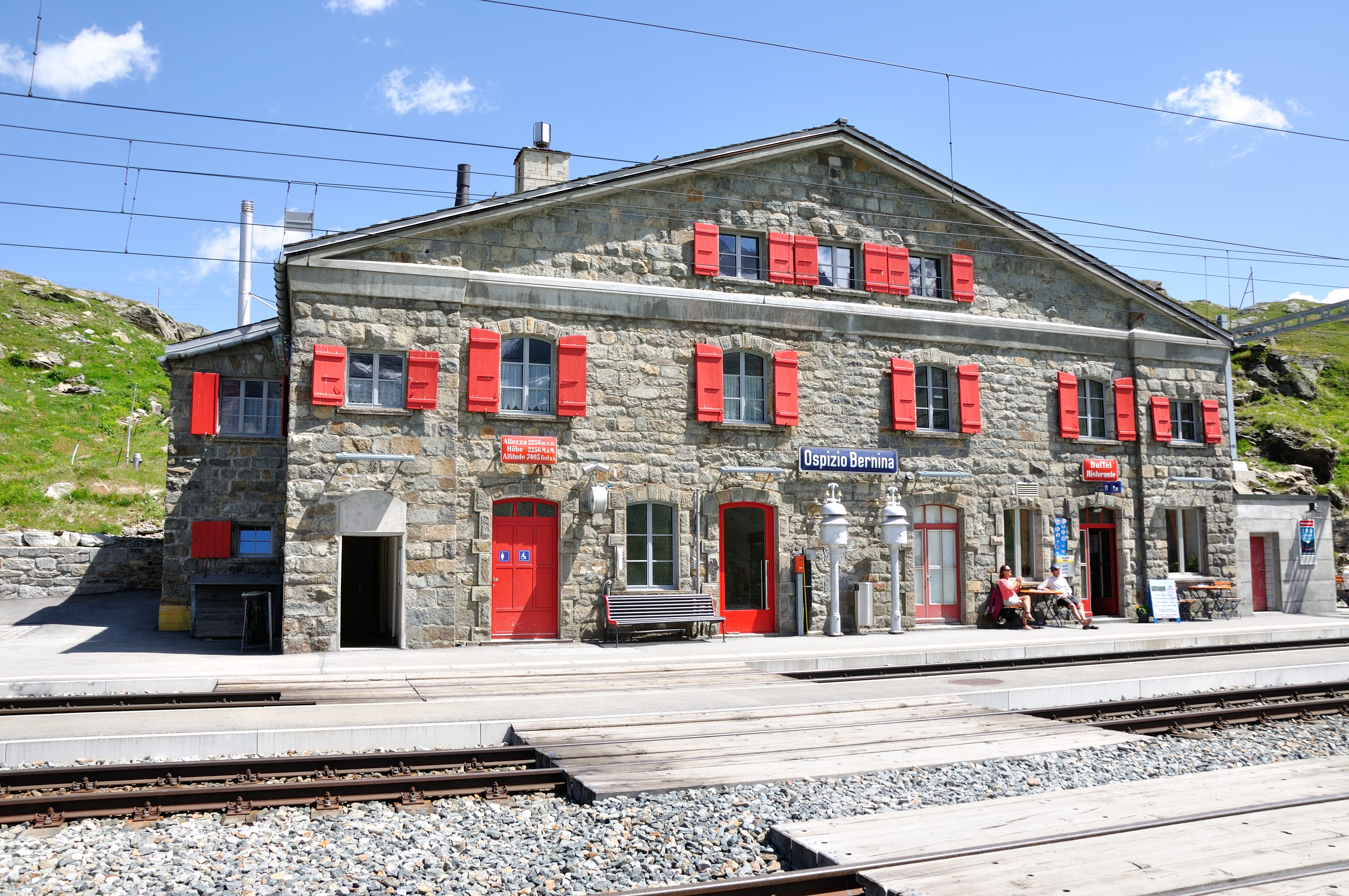
The front of the station

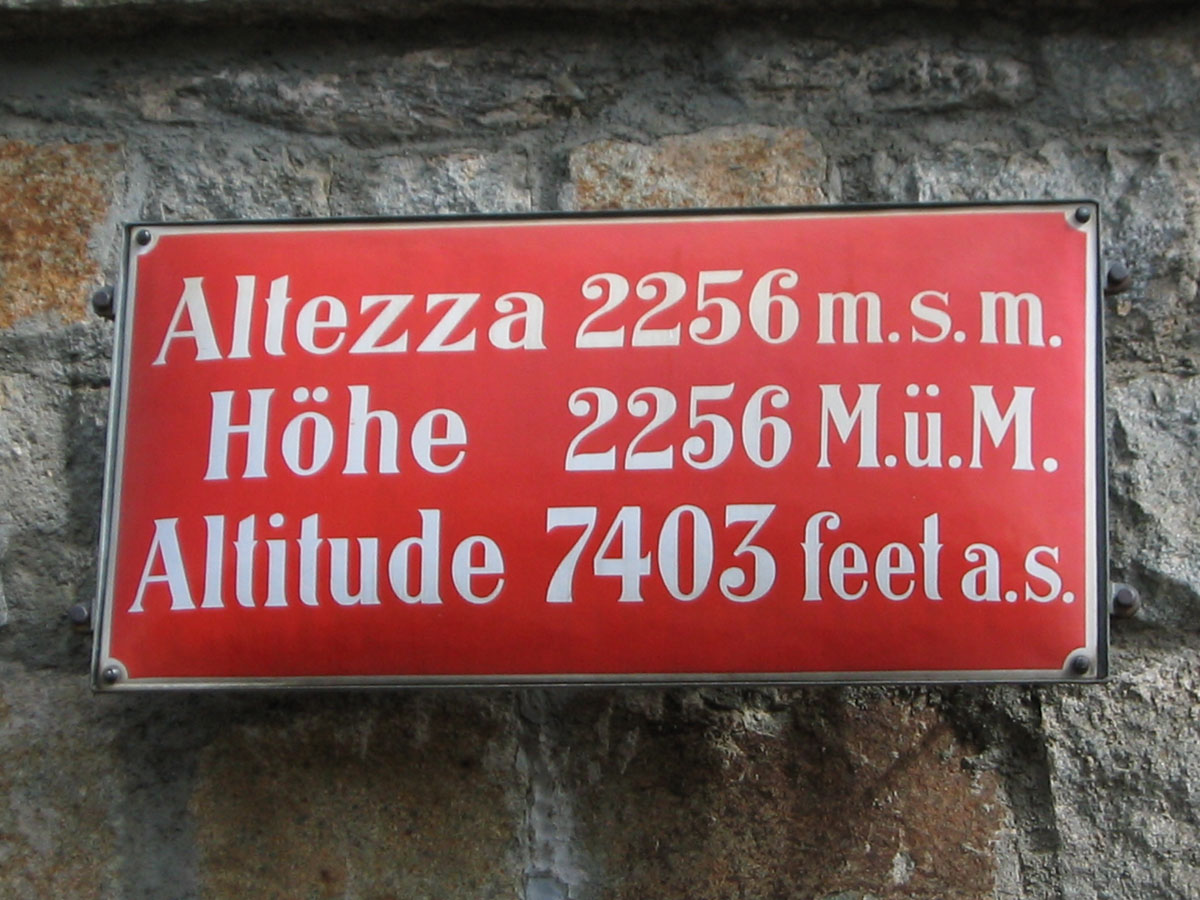
Old time plate on the facade of the station

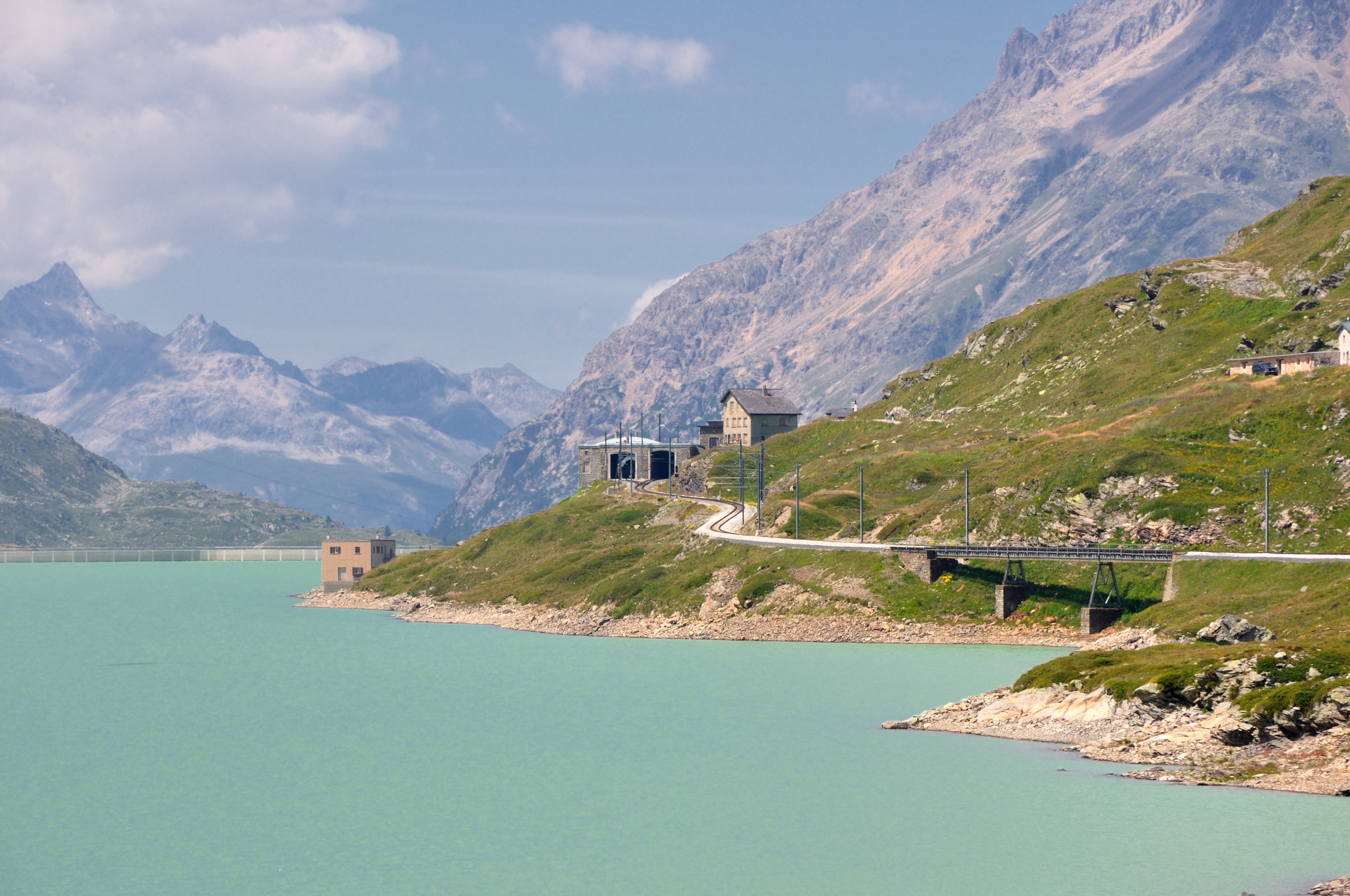
Lago Bianco and the Bernina line just south of the station

== Services ==
As of the December 2023 timetable change, the following services stop at Ospizio Bernina:

- RegioExpress / Regio: hourly service between St. Moritz and Tirano.
