= Val Poschiavo =

Valley in the Swiss canton of the Grisons

Coordinates: 46°18′32″N 10°3′41″E

Val Poschiavo (Lombard: Pus'ciaf, German: Puschlav, pronounced [pʊʃˈlaːf]) is a valley in the southern, Italian-speaking part of the Swiss canton of the Grisons. The main town is Poschiavo. The valley is known for its distinctive microclimate that supports a diverse agricultural landscape, ranging from alpine pastures in the north to orchards and small arable plots in the south. Since 2010, Val Poschiavo has emerged as Switzerland's leading region for organic farming, with over 83% of its agricultural land certified organic by 2021. The valley is served by the scenic Bernina Railway, part of the UNESCO World Heritage Rhaetian Railway, which connects the Upper Engadine to Tirano in Italy's Valtellina region.

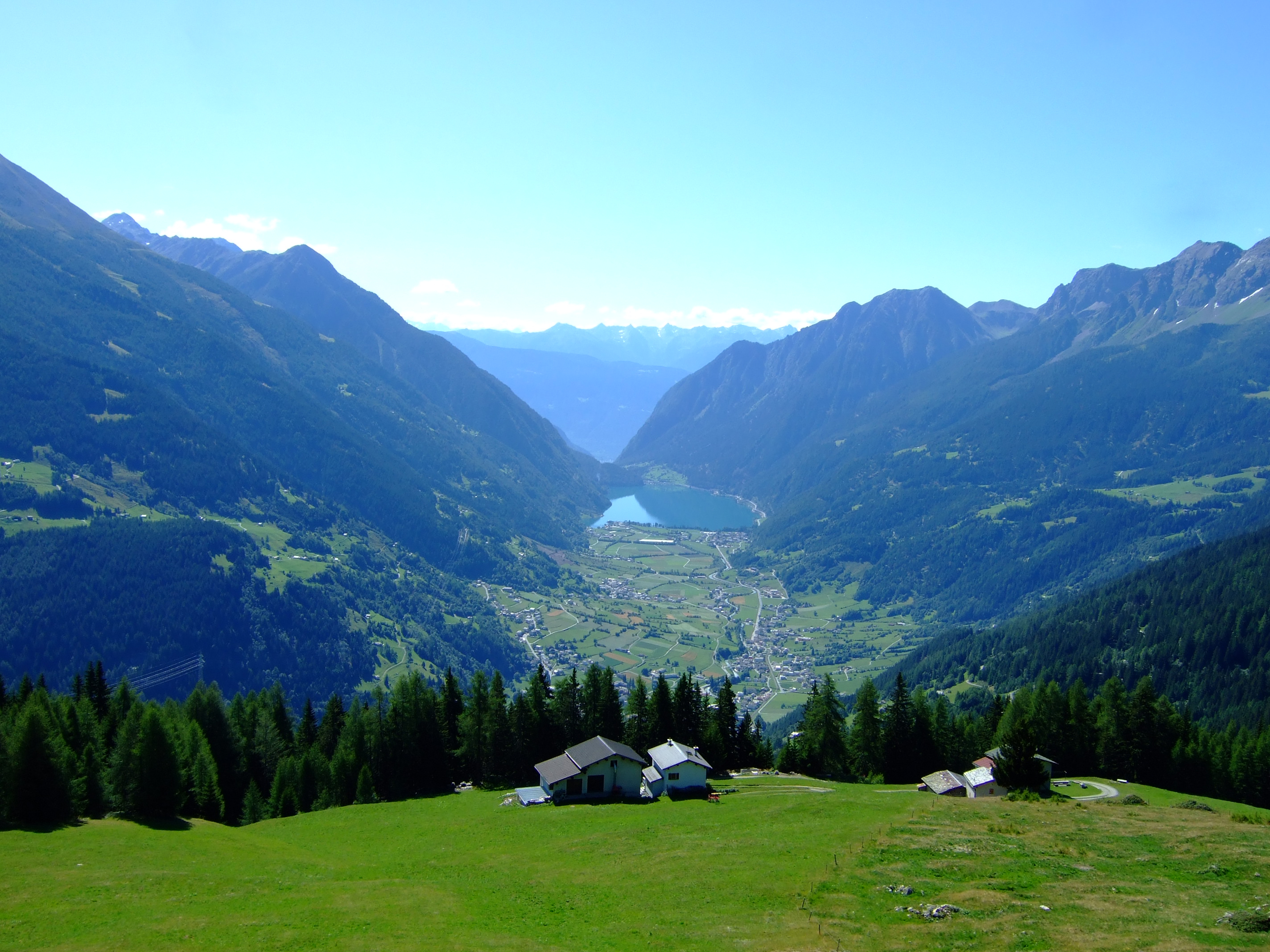
Central part with Lago di Poschiavo

== Geography ==
Val Poschiavo is a glacial trough valley running roughly north–south for about 25 km in the southern Alps. Hemmed in by the Bernina Range to the west and the Livigno Alps to the east, it is physically cut off from the Upper Engadine by the Bernina Pass (2,328 m elevation) and slopes southwards to Campocologno (553 m) on the Italian border. Across this drop of almost 1,800 m the floor broadens only modestly—between 6 and 16 km—so the surrounding peaks rise abruptly above the valley bottom, many exceeding 3,000 m. Isolation behind the Bernina barrier gives the valley a climate that is appreciably milder than that of the Engadin. Temperatures increase and precipitation declines towards the south, while a foehn-like northerly wind can periodically funnel down-valley and induce short droughts. Together with the dissected topography this creates a mosaic of microclimates: sub-alpine grassland and high-alpine pasture at the head of the valley grade within a few kilometres into orchards, chestnut groves and small arable plots around Poschiavo and Brusio. The Poschiavino river drains the entire basin, feeding a chain of reservoirs—most prominently Lago di Poschiavo—that supply the valley's hydropower network before the river reaches Tirano in the Valtellina.

== Land use ==
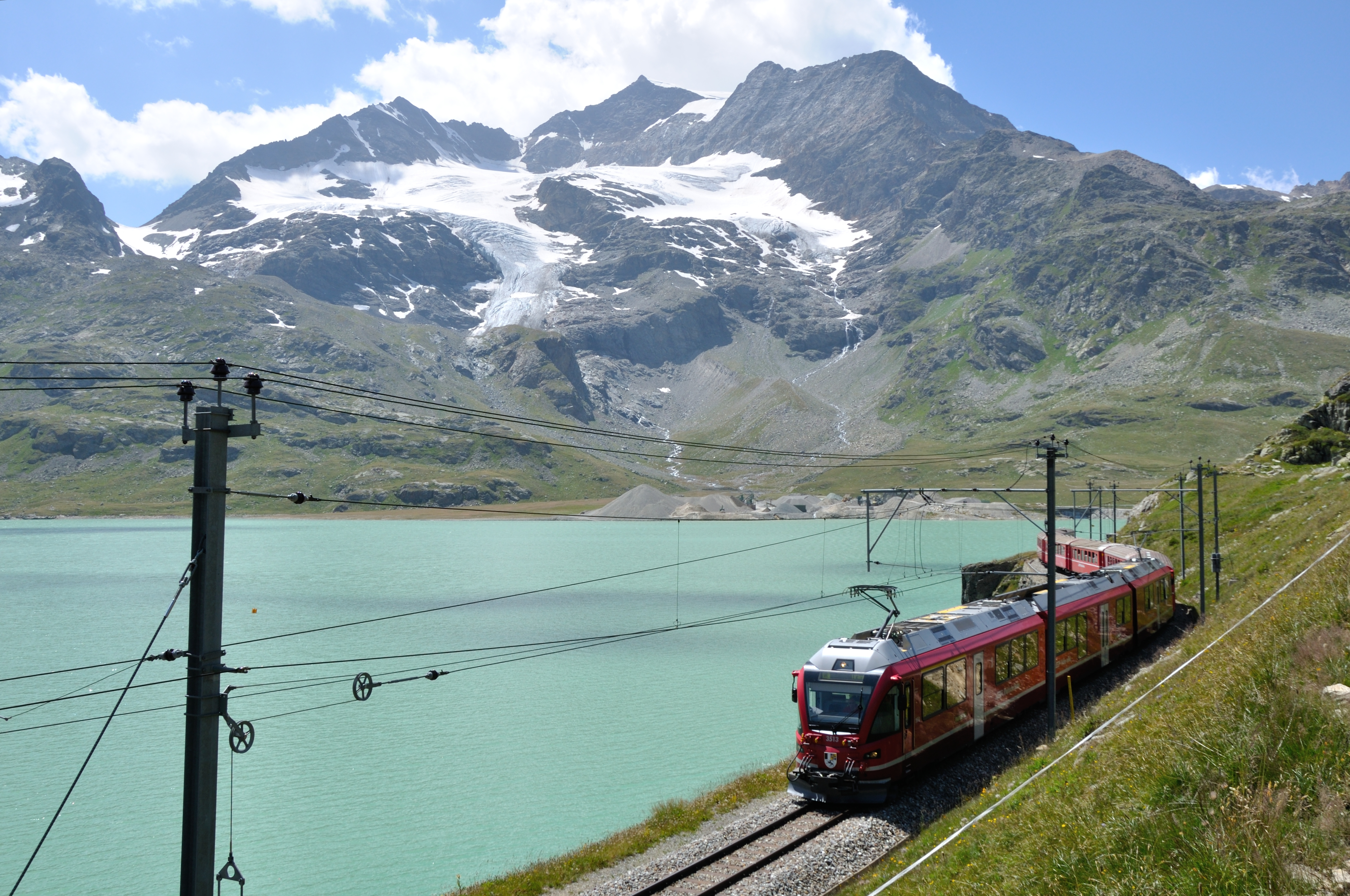
Bernina Express train passing Lago Bianco near Ospizio Bernina station

Historically, subsistence farming was the principal land use in Val Poschiavo until the mid-20th century, with fewer than half of all residents engaged full-time in agriculture as late as 1950. By 1990 that figure had declined to around 10 per cent, and today most farms operate on a part-time basis alongside other sources of income. The valley's southern Alpine climate supports a mixed farming regime: extensive grasslands and alpine pastures prevail in the cooler, northern reaches, while the lower, warmer slopes around Poschiavo and Brusio sustain small-scale vegetable plots, orchards (especially chestnuts and walnuts) and cereals such as rye and buckwheat. Specialist crops—including berries, herbs and medicinal plants—are cultivated on scattered parcels that benefit from diverse microclimates created by the sharply undulating terrain.

Since 2010 Val Poschiavo has seen a rapid shift to organic agriculture. By 2021, some 83.5 per cent of its agricultural land was farmed organically—the highest share of any Swiss region—and the number of certified organic holdings rose to 63 out of 84 farms in the district. This widespread conversion underpins both local agri-food branding and conservation of the valley's traditional land-use mosaic, combining heritage crops with pasture-based dairy and mixed arable systems.

At lower elevations around Poschiavo and Brusio, 27 per cent of farms cultivate grapevine, often under cross-border agreements with neighbouring Italy, while hemp and tobacco—once widespread—persist in small plots. Apiculture centred on rhododendron honey remains an important niche. Household gardens still employ herbal macerates (e.g. nettle, wormwood) as organic pest controls, and local livestock rations include Carum carvi seed infusions against bloat. This blend of Mediterranean and Alpine cropping reflects both the 3,500 m elevational gradient and a resilient tradition of multi-functional land use.
